= List of political parties in the Central African Republic =

The Central African Republic has a multi-party system, with two or three strong parties and a third party that is electorally successful.

== Parties ==
=== Current parties ===
==== Parliamentary parties ====
Party	Abbr.	Leader	Political position	Ideology	Assembly
United Hearts Movement; Mouvement cœurs unis	MCU	Faustin-Archange Touadéra	Centre-left	Social democracy	40 / 140
National Convergence "Kwa Na Kwa"; Convergence nationale - Kwa Na Kwa	KNK	François Bozizé	Centre-left	Pro-Bozizé; Labourism	9 / 140
Movement for the Liberation of the Central African People; Mouvement de libération du peuple centrafricain	MLPC	Martin Ziguélé	Centre-left to left-wing	Democratic socialism; Social democracy; Republicanism	7 / 140
National Movement of Independents; Mouvement national des indépendants	MOUNI				7 / 140
Union for Central African Renewal; Union pour le renouveau centrafricain	URCA	Anicet-Georges Dologuélé	Centre	Liberalism	7 / 140
Central African Democratic Rally; Rassemblement démocratique centrafricain	RDC	Désiré Kolingba	Centre-left to left-wing	African nationalism; Democratic socialism; Social democracy; Republicanism	6 / 140
African Party for Radical Transformation and Integration of States; Parti africain pour une transformation radicale et l'intégration des États	PATRIE	Crépin Mboli-Goumba			3 / 140
Path of Hope; Chemin de l'Espérance		Karim Meckassoua			3 / 140
National Union for Democracy and Progress; Union nationale pour la démocratie et le progrès	UNDP	Michel Amine			1 / 140
Party for Democratic Governance; Parti pour la gouvernance démocratique	PGD				1 / 140
National Union of Republican Democrats; Union nationale des démocrates républicains	UNADER				1 / 140

==== Other parties ====
- Alliance for Democracy and Progress
- Central African Republican Party
- Civic Forum
- Democratic Forum for Modernity
- Liberal Democratic Party
- Löndö Association
- Movement for Democracy and Development
- National Unity Party
- Patriotic Front for Progress
- People's Union for the Republic
- Social Democratic Party
- Union of Democratic Forces for Unity

=== Former parties ===
- Central African Democratic Union
- Movement for the Social Evolution of Black Africa
