= Laurent Gomina-Pampali =

Central African politician, writer and philosopher

Member of National Assembly
- In office 1993–?

Minister of Justice, Keeper of the Seals
- In office 15 January 1999 – 1 November 1999
- President: Ange-Félix Patassé
- Prime Minister: Anicet-Georges Dologuélé
- Preceded by: Marcel Météfara
- Succeeded by: Denis Wangao Kizimale

Minister of Human Rights and Promotion of Democratic Culture
- In office 18 February 1997 – 15 January 1999
- President: Ange-Félix Patassé
- Prime Minister: Michel Gbezera-Bria
- Preceded by: ?
- Succeeded by: ?

Minister of Foreign Affairs
- In office 1990–1991
- President: Andre Kolingba
- Preceded by: Michel Gbezera-Bria
- Succeeded by: Christian Lingama-Toleque

Personal details
- Born: 6 August 1949 (age 77) Bandoka, Nola, Ubangi-Shari (now the Central African Republic)
- Party: RDC; MLPC; UNADER
- Children: 4
- Education: Universities of Montpellier III
- Occupation: Professor; Politician; Philosopher

Laurent Gomina-Pampali (born 6 August 1949) is a Central African politician, writer, philosopher, and professor who served as Minister of Foreign Affairs (1990–1991) and Member of the National Assembly.

== Early life and education ==
A Mpiempu origin, Pampali was born in Bandoka on 6 August 1949. He enrolled at Lycée des Rapides and continued his tertiary education at the Universities of Montpellier III, studying philosophy.

== Career ==
Upon finishing his studies in Montpellier in 1978, he returned to Bangui and worked as a philosophy professor at the University of Bangui in 1981. In 1990, Kolingba appointed Pampali as the Minister of Foreign Affairs and he held that position for one year. Under his tenure, the Central African Republic broke diplomatic ties with the People's Republic of China and established relation with the Republic of China. In 1993, Pampali ran for the election as a parliament member candidate from RDC party representing Nola Second District and won a seat at the National Assembly. The following year, he left RDC and joined MLPC. Nevertheless, he later rejoined RDC.

In 1998, Pampali was reelected as a member of the National Assembly. Patasse appointed him Minister of Human Rights and Promotion of Democratic Culture and later Minister of Justice on 15 January 1999. He served as the minister of justice for one year. In 2003, François Bozizé selected Pampali as one of the members of the National Transitional Council. Pampali founded a political party named Republican democratic reflection and action group (GRADER) on 26 July 2004. The same year, he joined the National Union of Republican Democrats (UNADER) and became its leader. In the 2005 Central African general election, Pampali supported Bozize and ran for the election as UNADER MP candidate, where he won the election. In 2008, he was elected as the president of the Interparliamentary Commission of CEMAC for two years. In 2011, he was re-elected again as a member of the National Assembly.

In the 2015–16 Central African general election, Pampali ran as a presidential candidate in the first round and received 5,834 votes. Later, he endorsed Touadera for his "intellectual qualities and mental closeness to Barthelemy Boganda." He was elected as an MP and served as the vice president of Education, Health, Social Affairs, Arts, and Cultural Committee. In 2018, Pampali was appointed as the chief of staff of the National Assembly.

Pampali criticized Touadera's initiative to hold 2023 Central African constitutional referendum in which he blamed a small influential group who persuaded the president to conduct it for their interests.

== Personal life ==
He is married and has four children.

== Works ==
- Le deputé Boganda et la conscience nationale (2000)
- La Centrafrique face à lui-même (2001)
- Critique de l’unilatéralisme idéologique occicental (2012)
- Que revive la République (2020)

== Bibliography ==
- Bradshaw, Richard; Rius, Juan Fandos (2016). Historical Dictionary of the Central African Republic (Historical Dictionaries of Africa). Lanham: Rowman & Littlefield.
