= Democratic Movement for the Renaissance and Evolution of Central Africa =

Political party in the Central African Republic

The Democratic Movement for the Renaissance and Evolution of Central Africa (French: Mouvement Démocratique pour la Renaissance et l'Evolution en Centrafrique, MDREC) is a political party in the Central African Republic.

== History ==
The party was established in 1990, and led by Joseph Bendounga, a campaigner for democracy and mayor of the capital Bangui. In mid-1992 Bendounga was arrested and sent to prison for six months for criticising President André Kolingba.

In the 1993 general elections the party won a single seat in the National Assembly. In the 1999 presidential elections the party supported incumbent President Ange-Félix Patassé. Although Bendounga was chosen as the party's candidate for the 2005 presidential elections and he applied to contest the elections, his name did not appear on the ballot.

The party contested the 2011 parliamentary elections, although it only put forward two candidates, and failed to win a seat. It subsequently backed Séléka in their overthrow of the President François Bozizé in 2013.
