= 2011 Central African general election =

Re-election of François Bozizé

- 23 January 2011
- Presidential election
- Registered: 1,825,735
- Turnout: 61.21%
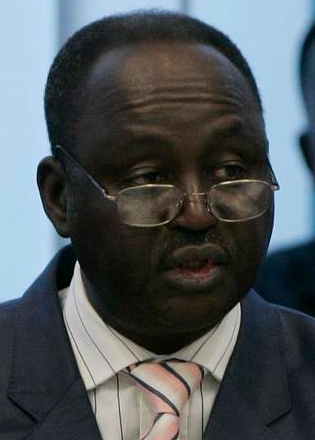

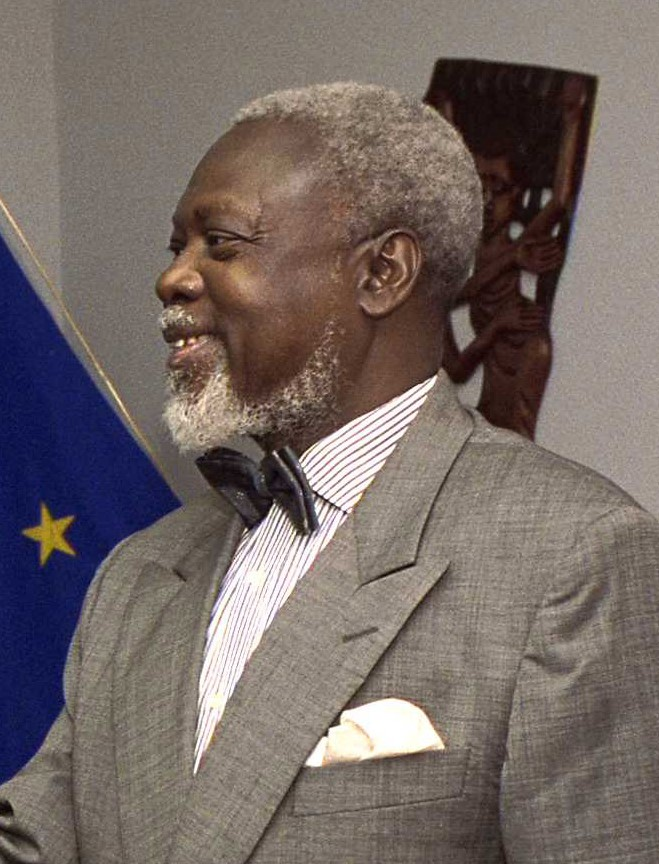

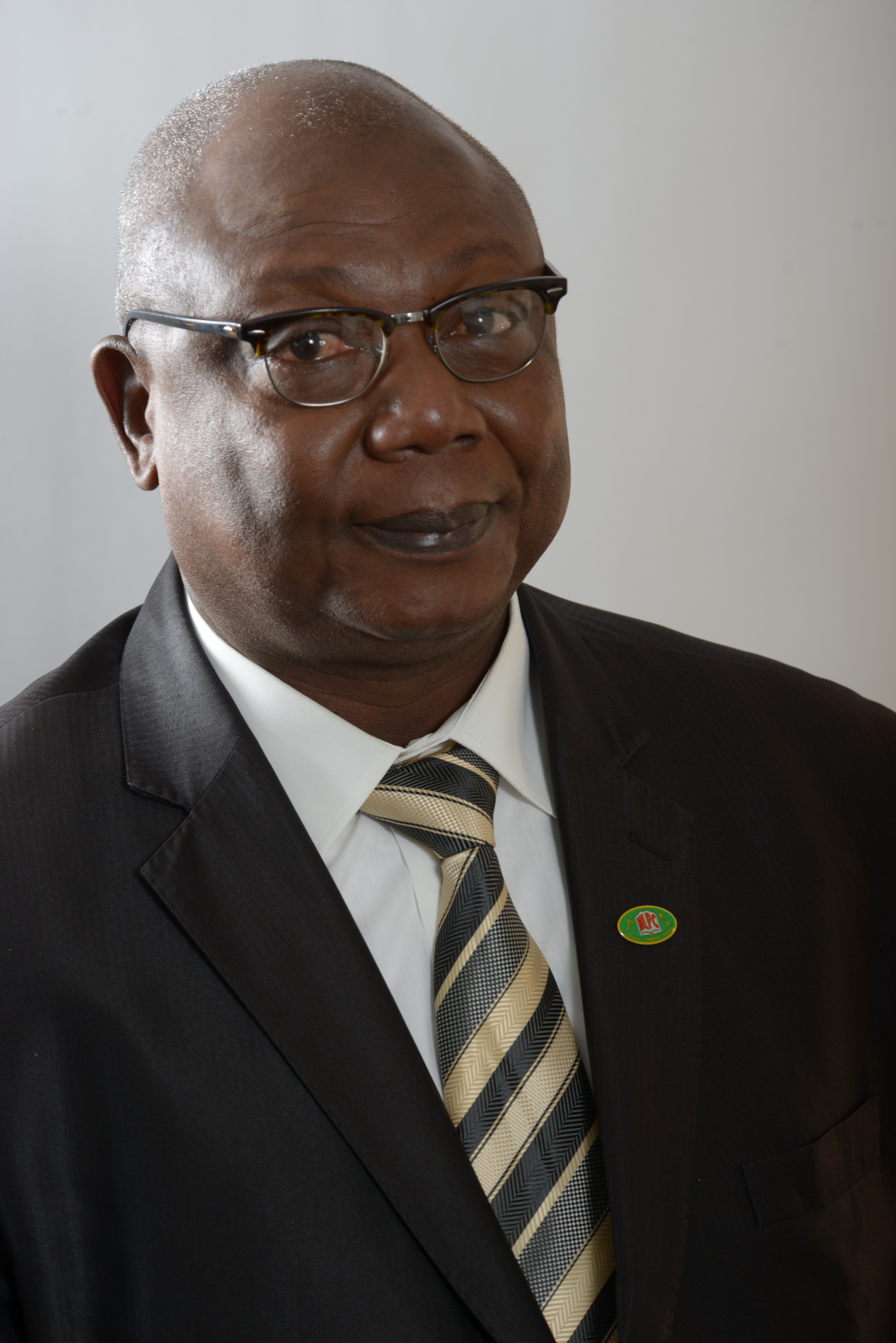
| Nominee | François Bozizé | Ange-Félix Patassé | Martin Ziguélé |
| Party | KNK | Independent | MLPC |
| Popular vote | 718,801 | 239,279 | 75,939 |
| Percentage | 64.47% | 21.43% | 6.80% |
President before election
François Bozizé
KNK
Elected President
François Bozizé
KNK
- Parliamentary election
- All 100 seats in the National Assembly; 51 seats needed for a majority
| Party | Leader | Seats | +/– |
|---|---|---|---|
| KNK | François Bozizé | 61 | +45 |
| MLPC | Ange-Félix Patassé | 1 | −10 |
| PAD | Laurent Ngon Baba | 3 | +1 |
| MDD | Louis Papéniah | 2 | 0 |
| RDC | Émile Gros Raymond Nakombo | 1 | −6 |
| MESAN–Boganda | Dieudonné-Auguste Mbangot | 1 | +1 |
| MDI-PS | Daniel Nditifei-Boysembé | 1 | −2 |
| PNCN | Cyriaque Gonda | 1 | −6 |
| UNADER | Laurent Gomina-Pampali | 1 | −1 |
| PDCA | Michel Zabolo | 1 | −7 |
| PSD | Enoch Derant Lakoué | 1 | −4 |
| MLPC | Martin Ziguélé | 1 | −10 |
| RDC | André Kolingba | 1 | −6 |
| Independents | – | 26 | −1 |
This lists parties that won seats. See the complete results below.
| Prime Minister before | Prime Minister after |
|---|---|
| Faustin-Archange Touadéra; KNK | Faustin-Archange Touadéra; KNK |

General elections were held in the Central African Republic on 23 January 2011 to elect the President and National Assembly, having been postponed numerous times. Incumbent President François Bozizé was re-elected for a second term in the first round of voting, receiving 66% of the vote. The organization of the elections was plagued by difficulties, and the opposition repeatedly demanded its postponement. Ultimately it was delayed until January 2011, requiring an extension of the terms of both the President and the National Assembly.

The second round of the parliamentary elections was held on 27 March 2011, after being postponed from 20 March. The National Convergence "Kwa Na Kwa" remained the largest party in the National Assembly, winning 61 of the 100 seats.

== Background ==
The Independent Electoral Commission (CEI) was established in August 2009 to oversee the elections. Headed by Joseph Binguimale, the CEI was composed of 30 members, 15 of whom represented the opposition (both the civilian opposition and former rebel groups). However, the opposition announced on 15 January 2010 that it was suspending its participation on the CEI due to its objections to Binguimale's leadership of the body. According to the opposition, Binguimale showed blatant favoritism toward President Bozizé and the pro-Bozizé National Convergence "Kwa Na Kwa" party, and it demanded Binguimale's resignation. Opposition leader Jean-Jacques Demafouth denounced Binguimale, saying that he was guilty of "breaching his oath, a total absence of independence, scheming with the aim of promoting massive fraud, dubious morality and notorious incompetence". CEI spokesman Rigobert Vondo said that the CEI would "continue to make progress on the electoral process with those who are left".

It was initially proposed to hold the elections on 18 April 2010, with a second round on 23 May. However, the opposition objected to that date, saying that it was too early. Subsequently, the date of the first round was set for 25 April 2010.

In mid-March 2010, the government claimed to have thwarted a coup plot. Jules Bernard Ouandé, the Minister of National Security, expressed unwillingness to reveal the leader of the coup plot, but his reference to the involvement of someone called "AFP" indicated that the government was implicating Ange-Félix Patassé in the plot. Patasse, who was President from 1993 until he was ousted by Bozizé in March 2003, had declared his candidacy in the election. Responding to the suggestion of his involvement in the plot, Patasse said that he was not involved and argued that the government might be intending to use the allegation to sideline his candidacy. He vowed to win the election, noting that he had previously won elections in 1993 and 1999.

On 30 March 2010, Bozizé decreed a postponement of the election date by three weeks, rescheduling it for 16 May. That move was widely anticipated due to the slow progress of electoral preparations. However, the opposition coalition, the Forces of Change Collective, wanted a longer delay and felt that pushing the date back by three weeks was entirely insufficient to address its concerns. The government was apparently unwilling to delay the election any further, and consequently the coalition announced on 9 April 2010 that it would boycott both the presidential and the parliamentary election. According to coalition spokesman Nicolas Tiangaye, the "conditions ... do not guarantee credibility, reliability and transparency." The deadline for candidate applications was later on the same day at midnight, and Tiangaye said that none of the coalition's members had submitted applications for either election.

President Bozizé held a meeting with the CEI and an assortment of political actors on 29 April 2010. At the meeting, the CEI said that it would be impossible to hold the election as planned on 16 May, as the preparations were nowhere near completion. According to the CEI, the revised voter rolls would not be ready by 16 May, voter cards had not been printed, and the CEI had far less money than needed to complete the preparations. It estimated that a sum of 5.3 million euros was needed. Immediately following the meeting, Bozizé publicly accepted that the 16 May date could not be met: "We will go to the polls when all the parties involved in these elections, including the international community, will be ready." Recognizing that the delay could mean that the election would be held after the constitutional end of his term on 11 June 2010, he said that the National Assembly would need to take the appropriate steps to enable him to continue in office beyond that point.

On 3 May 2010, the National Assembly accordingly began debate on changing the constitution to allow the President and the National Assembly to remain in office beyond the end of their mandates if necessary due to the timing of an election. The opposition supported the change, but it was conscious of the case of Côte d'Ivoire's continuously postponed election and wanted the change to be accompanied by a political agreement. The constitutional change was overwhelmingly approved by the National Assembly in a vote on 10 May 2010; 95 deputies voted in favor, six voted against, and one abstained. An estimated 30,000 to 50,000 people marched in Bangui on 19 May 2010 to express support for the move to extend Bozizé's term. In their slogans, they equated support for Bozizé with support for peace. Elie Ouéfio, the Secretary-General of the Presidency, said that the people had rallied against "a descent into hell for our country". The Constitutional Court approved the term extensions on 25 May 2010.

On 16 June 2010, the CEI proposed holding the election on 24 October 2010, believing that would allow sufficient time to properly organize the election. That date was not officially set, however, as only Bozizé could set a date through presidential decree. Binguimale said that the CEI was "finally convinced that by 24 October, all of the challenges will be completely resolved." However, ultimately Bozizé opted for a later date than the one recommended by CEI, apparently due to the ongoing security issues; in a decree announced on 30 July 2010, he set the date for the election as 23 January 2011, with campaigning scheduled to begin on 10 January. The Central African Democratic Rally (RDC) and the prospective opposition candidate Jean-Jacques Demafouth quickly expressed support for the January 2011 date, and the UFVN, the main opposition coalition, signed an agreement approving the new date on 11 August 2010. Speaking for the government, Fidele Ngouandjika expressed the hope that the broad political agreement on the January 2011 date would mean that international financial assistance for the election would come soon.

On 27 July 2010 Binguimale once again postponed the elections, stating "What is delaying the final decision on these elections at the moment is that the European Union requires confirmation of a date prior to providing us financial assistance". The elections were postponed again in July 2010 to 23 January 2011, with a second round scheduled for 20 March 2011, later postponed to 27 March 2011.

== Candidates ==
At a rally in Bangui on 15 March 2010, Bozizé announced that he would stand as a candidate for a second term as President.

As a result of the opposition coalition's decision to boycott the elections, only two presidential candidates submitted applications before the deadline: François Bozizé and Ange-Félix Patassé. However, Patassé said on 10 April that he had reached an agreement with Bozizé that would be "beneficial for the whole Central African people". Although he did not clarify what sort of agreement had been reached, reports suggested that the agreement could produce a delay in the election.

Ultimately five candidates registered for the presidential elections:

- incumbent president François Bozizé (National Convergence "Kwa Na Kwa")
- former president Ange-Félix Patassé (independent)
- former defence minister Jean-Jacques Démafouth (New Alliance for Progress, former political leader of the People's Army for the Restoration of Democracy)
- former PM Martin Ziguélé (Movement for the Liberation of the Central African People)
- Émile Gros Raymond Nakombo (Central African Democratic Rally)

Another candidate initially registered for the election, but was rejected on 8 January 2011 due to a bouncing cheque:

- Justin Wilite (Congress for the African Renaissance)

== Conduct ==
The CEI began work on an operation to revise the voter rolls on 12 April; the operation was planned to conclude on 18 April. The opposition felt the revision was inadequate, believing that the voter rolls should be completely revised. The CEI announced on 16 April that a soldier had been killed in Vakaga Prefecture, located in the far north of the country, while escorting a group of CEI workers. The identity of the attackers was unclear, and the CEI characterized them as "bandits".

On election day there were complaints of voting delays due to long lines.

== Results ==
=== President ===
President Bozizé was expected to win re-election easily; Patassé was considered the most formidable opposition candidate, but the outcome was never seriously doubted. Before any results were released, Ziguélé, Démafouth, and Nakombo denounced the vote as farcical and fraudulent. The CEI released provisional results on 1 February 2011 showing that Bozizé had won the election in the first round with 66.08% of the vote. Patassé was credited with 20.10% of the vote, while the other candidates trailed with scores in the single digits: 6.46% for Ziguélé, 4.64% for Nakombo, and 2.72% for Démafouth. Ngouandjika, the government's spokesman, declared that the outcome was "a victory for democracy"; Ziguélé, on the other hand, characterized the CEI's announcement as "a non-event ... crass and ridiculous". He said that he and other opposition candidates would appeal to the Constitutional Court, but he acknowledged that it was only a symbolic gesture, as he fully expected that the Court would reject the appeal.

| Candidate | Party | Votes | % |
|---|---|---|---|
| François Bozizé | National Convergence "Kwa Na Kwa" | 718,801 | 64.37 |
| Ange-Félix Patassé | Independent | 239,279 | 21.43 |
| Martin Ziguélé | Movement for the Liberation of the Central African People | 75,939 | 6.80 |
| Émile Gros Raymond Nakombo | Central African Democratic Rally | 51,469 | 4.61 |
| Jean-Jacques Démafouth | ANP–APRD | 31,184 | 2.79 |
| Total | | 1,116,672 | 100.00 |
| Valid votes | | 1,116,672 | 99.93 |
| Invalid/blank votes | | 775 | 0.07 |
| Total votes | | 1,117,447 | 100.00 |
| Registered voters/turnout | | 1,825,735 | 61.21 |
Source: Psephos

=== National Assembly ===
In the first round on 23 January, 35 members were elected: 26 from Bozizé's National Convergence "Kwa Na Kwa", 8 independents (some of whom are Bozizé supporters) and one from the Movement for the Liberation of the Central African People. Run-offs were to be held in 68 seats (with Kwa na Kwa leading in most of them), and re-runs in Birao 2 (where two polling stations failed to open) and in Boganda (whence results were not reported to the Electoral Commission).

| Party or alliance | | First round | | | Second round | | | Total seats | +/– |
| Party or alliance | | Votes | % | Seats | Votes | % | Seats | Total seats | +/– |
|---|---|---|---|---|---|---|---|---|---|
| National Convergence "Kwa Na Kwa" | | | | 25 | | | 36 | 61 | +19 |
| Presidential; Majority | Action Party for Development | | | 0 | | | 3 | 3 | +1 |
| Presidential; Majority | Movement for Democracy and Development | | | 0 | | | 2 | 2 | 0 |
| Presidential; Majority | MESAN–Boganda | | | 0 | | | 1 | 1 | +1 |
| Presidential; Majority | Movement for Democracy, Independence and Social Progress | | | 0 | | | 1 | 1 | –2 |
| Presidential; Majority | National Party for a New Central Africa | | | 0 | | | 1 | 1 | –6 |
| Presidential; Majority | National Union for Democracy and Rally | | | 0 | | | 1 | 1 | –1 |
| Presidential; Majority | Party for Democracy in Central Africa | | | 0 | | | 1 | 1 | –7 |
| Presidential; Majority | Social Democratic Party | | | 0 | | | 1 | 1 | –4 |
| Presidential; Majority | Central African People's National Democratic Union | | | 0 | | | 0 | 0 | 0 |
| Presidential; Majority | Central African Republican Party | | | 0 | | | 0 | 0 | 0 |
| Presidential; Majority | Central African Socialist Movement | | | 0 | | | 0 | 0 | 0 |
| Presidential; Majority | Congress of Central African Social Democrats | | | 0 | | | 0 | 0 | –1 |
| Presidential; Majority | Congress of Democrats for Central African Renewal | | | 0 | | | 0 | 0 | 0 |
| Presidential; Majority | Democratic Forum for Modernity | | | 0 | | | 0 | 0 | –1 |
| Presidential; Majority | Liberal Democratic Party | | | 0 | | | 0 | 0 | –3 |
| Presidential; Majority | National Democratic Front | | | 0 | | | 0 | 0 | –1 |
| Presidential; Majority | National Movement for Renewal | | | 0 | | | 0 | 0 | 0 |
| Presidential; Majority | National Union for the Defence of Democracy | | | 0 | | | 0 | 0 | 0 |
| Presidential; Majority | National Unity Party | | | 0 | | | 0 | 0 | –3 |
| Presidential; Majority | Patriotic Front for Progress | | | 0 | | | 0 | 0 | –2 |
| Presidential; Majority | People's Union for Social and Economic Development | | | 0 | | | 0 | 0 | 0 |
| Presidential; Majority | Union for a Popular Central African Movement | | | 0 | | | 0 | 0 | 0 |
| Presidential; Majority | Union for Progress in Central Africa | | | 0 | | | 0 | 0 | 0 |
| Presidential; Majority | Union of Democrats for Panafrican Renewal | | | 0 | | | 0 | 0 | 0 |
| Presidential; Majority | Total | | | 0 | | | 11 | 11 | – |
| Movement for the Liberation of the Central African People | | | | 1 | | | 0 | 1 | –10 |
| Central African Democratic Rally | | | | 0 | | | 1 | 1 | –7 |
| Alliance for Democracy and Progress | | | | 0 | | | 0 | 0 | –2 |
| Alliance for Solidarity and Progress | | | | 0 | | | 0 | 0 | 0 |
| Central African Democratic Decision for Development | | | | 0 | | | 0 | 0 | 0 |
| Democratic Movement for the Renaissance and Evolution of Central Africa | | | | 0 | | | 0 | 0 | 0 |
| Democratic Republicans' Union | | | | 0 | | | 0 | 0 | 0 |
| Movement for the Social Evolution of Black Africa | | | | 0 | | | 0 | 0 | 0 |
| New Alliance for Progress | | | | 0 | | | 0 | 0 | New |
| Union for Renewal and Democracy | | | | 0 | | | 0 | 0 | 0 |
| Independents | | | | 8 | | | 18 | 26 | –8 |
| Total | | | | 34 | | | 66 | 100 | –5 |
Source: IFES, Journal of Democracy

== Aftermath ==
The Constitution Court upheld Bozizé's victory on 12 February 2011, rejecting the opposition appeals. The results were slightly revised in the final figures given by the Court; Bozizé's total was revised downward to 64.37%, while Patassé's score was raised to 21.41% and Ziguélé's score was raised to 6.8%. Ziguélé condemned the Court's decision: "This decision by the Court in no way changes our judgement. The Court ... decided to see nothing and to say nothing." He vowed "to continue the political struggle for democracy, for the rule of law".

Bozizé was sworn in for his second term at a ceremony in Bangui on 15 March 2011, the eighth anniversary of his seizure of power in 2003.
