= Charles Massi =

Central African politician

Charles Massi (25 July 1952 – 8 January 2010) was a Central African politician and rebel leader. Massi served as a minister in the government of the Central African Republic during the 1990s and again from 2005 to 2008; he was also the President of the Democratic Forum for Modernity (FODEM) party from 1997 to 2008. He became a rebel leader in 2008, heading the Convention of Patriots for Justice and Peace (CPJP).

Massi was apparently killed by the government under unclear circumstances in January 2010.

== Political career ==
Massi was born in Baboua, Nana-Mambéré Prefecture. He was President of the Committee for Information and the Defense of Democracy, which he founded on November 17, 1991. After the victory of Ange-Felix Patassé of the Movement for the Liberation of the Central African People (MLPC) in the August 1993 presidential election, Massi joined the government of Prime Minister Jean-Luc Mandaba as Minister of Energy and Mineral Resources in October 1993, remaining in this position until June 1996. On February 6, 1997, he became Minister of Agriculture and Animal Husbandry.

Massi founded FODEM on 27 November 1997 and was dismissed from the government in December, due to the establishment of FODEM and, according to Massi, his opposition to corruption. FODEM was legally recognized on 4 May 1998. He served as a Deputy from Baboua in the National Assembly from 1998 until François Bozizé seized power from Patassé in March 2003.

Running as the FODEM candidate in the presidential election held on 19 September 1999, Massi placed eighth out of ten candidates, winning 1.31% of the vote.

After Bozizé took power, Massi was elected as Second Vice-president of the National Transitional Council on 14 June 2003, serving in that capacity until the new National Assembly was installed in June 2005. Massi was again elected to the National Assembly from Baboua in the second round of the 2005 parliamentary election, held in May, receiving 52.39% of the vote and defeating Gon Baba.

Massi also participated in the first round of the 2005 presidential election, held along with the parliamentary first round on 13 March, as the FODEM candidate. Prior to the election, his presidential candidacy was rejected, along with a number of other candidates, by the Constitutional Court on December 30, 2004; however, on January 4, 2005, Bozizé announced that Massi, along with two other initially barred candidates, would be allowed to run. In the election, he placed fifth out of eleven candidates, receiving 3.22% of the vote. On April 21, Massi signed an agreement to support Bozizé in the second round of the election, and after Bozizé's victory, Massi became Minister of State for Equipment, Transport and Civil Aviation in the government of Prime Minister Élie Doté, which was named on June 19, 2005. In a cabinet reshuffle on September 2, 2006, he was instead appointed as Minister of State for Rural Development; he served in the latter position until he was excluded from the government of Prime Minister Faustin Archange Touadéra in January 2008.

=== Rebellion and death ===
A few months after his dismissal, on 12 May 2008, Massi was appointed as Political Coordinator for the rebel group Union of Democratic Forces for Unity (UFDR); FODEM responded to this by suspending Massi from the party on 16 May, and he was expelled from the Presidential Majority on 18 May. FODEM established a provisional political bureau on 22 May 2008 with Joseph Garba Ouangolé as president, and it expelled Massi from its ranks.

In early June 2009, Massi attempted to enter the Central African Republic from Chad and was arrested by the Chadian authorities, who announced that they would put him on trial for "attempting to destabilize a neighbouring country". The Chadians reportedly released Massi after a time, however. Massi's group, then called the Convention of Patriots for Justice and Peace (CPJP), continued to fight the government in the northwest of the Central African Republic; by that point it was the only rebel group still active.

Massi's wife Denise and the CPJP said on 16 January 2010 that Massi, who they said was held at the Central African prison of Bossembélé, had died on 8 January from the effects of torture. Their information was said to have come from sources at Bossembele as well as sources around the Presidency. If they were wrong in believing Massi was dead, their statement called on Bozizé to prove he was still alive. The Central African Ministry of Defense formally denied killing Massi in a statement on 21 January and said that the government did not know where he was.

Later, on 30 January 2010, President Bozizé acknowledged that Massi had been killed, although he provided no details. He was dismissive of the concerns of human rights groups, saying that those groups had not shown similar concern "when 15 of our soldiers were killed by Massi's rebels". Furthermore, he said that he had told the French ambassador "that Mrs. Massi should have advised her husband not to take part in a rebellion against me". Nevertheless, the matter remained confused. Although Massi's family believed him to be dead, an official legal investigation announced in August 2010 that it had found no evidence to suggest that Massi had died at Bossembélé, and it said that Massi was accordingly considered to be missing and "presumed alive".
