= Central African Republican Party =

Political party in the Central African Republic

- President: Jeanne-Marie Ruth Rolland
- Founder: Jeanne-Marie Ruth-Rolland
- Founded: 1991
- Headquarters: Bangui
- Ideology: Republicanism; Conservative liberalism Rhine capitalism

Website
- http://www.fodem.org/

The Central African Republican Party (French: Parti Républicain Centrafricain, PRC) is a political party in the Central African Republic.

== History ==
The party was founded by Jeanne-Marie Ruth-Rolland in 1991 after she was released from prison. She won a seat in the National Assembly in the 1992 general elections, but the results were later annulled. In the 1993 general elections Ruth-Rolland stood as the party's presidential candidate, finishing last in a field of eight with 1% of the vote. The party won a single seat in the National Assembly, with Ruth-Rolland winning a seat in Bakouma.

Ruth-Rolland led the party until her death in 1995, and was succeeded by Jacques Ngoli. The party failed to win a seat in the 1998 parliamentary elections, and did not contest the 1999 presidential elections. The party also failed to win a seat in the 2005 general elections.

In 2010 the party joined the Presidential Majority alliance in preparation for the 2011 general elections. The PRC nominated a single candidate for the 105 seats in the National Assembly, and although the alliance won 11 seats, the PRC again failed to win a seat.
