= Movement for Democracy and Development (Central African Republic) =

Political party in the Central African Republic

Movement for Democracy and Development Mouvement pour la Démocratie et le Développement
- President: Louis Papéniah
- Founder: David Dacko
- Founded: 15 December 1993
- Headquarters: Bangui

The Movement for Democracy and Development (French: Mouvement pour la Démocratie et le Développement, MDD) is a political party in the Central African Republic, established by former President David Dacko. It is currently led by Louis Papéniah.

== History ==
The party originated from the David Dacko Movement (Mouvement David Dacko, MDD) that contested the 1993 general elections; the MDD won six seats in the National Assembly, whilst Dacko was the party's candidate for the presidency, coming third in the first round with 20% of the vote. Following the elections the group became part of a coalition government headed by Jean-Luc Mandaba of the Movement for the Liberation of the Central African People (MLPC).

The group was transformed into the MDD when it was formally established on 15 December 1993.

In the next parliamentary elections in 1998 the MDD was part of the Union of Forces for Peace, (UFAP) which opposed President Ange-Félix Patassé. The MDD won eight seats, and UFAP gained a majority of 55 of the 109 seats in the National Assembly. However, the MLPC was able to form a government after the defection of a UFAP MP. Despite being in opposition, four MDD members were appointed ministers in Anicet-Georges Dologuélé's government. However, three of them were pressured into resigning by the MDD leadership a few days later. In the presidential elections the following year, Dacko was again the party's candidate. He again finished third with 11% of the vote.

Following Dacko's death in 2003, elections were held for party president in September 2004. Former National Assembly vice president Rufin Brice Molomadon was elected, with 29 votes, defeating former Information Minister Emmanuel Bongopassi (13 votes) and former Commerce Minister Simon Didier Bongolapè (9 votes). The party contested the 2005 elections as part of the National Convergence "Kwa Na Kwa" alliance, winning two of the alliance's 42 seats.

The MDD was given one ministerial post in the government formed by Faustin-Archange Touadéra in 2009. In 2010 the party joined the Presidential Majority alliance in preparation for the 2011 general elections. The MDD nominated 15 candidates for the 105 seats in the National Assembly, winning two of the alliance's 11 seats.
