= Jean-Jacques Démafouth =

Central African politician (born 1959)

Minister of Defense
- In office 1 November 1999 – 30 August 2001
- President: Ange-Félix Patassé
- Prime Minister: Anicet-Georges Dologuélé
- Preceded by: Pascal Kado
- Succeeded by: Pierre Angoa

Personal details
- Born: 3 November 1959 (age 66) Bangui, Ubangi-Shari

Jean-Jacques Démafouth (born November 3, 1959) is a political leader in the Central African Republic. He is a former defense minister, presidential candidate, and is the current political leader of the APRD rebel group. He led the peace delegation of the APRD to talks with the government in December 2008.

== Coup arrest ==
Démafouth was defense minister under President Ange-Felix Patasse. When a coup attempt against Patasse failed in May 2001, Démafouth was arrested for conspiracy. After a long trial against 680 defendants, Démafouth was among the 49 acquitted in October 2002 by a CAR judge for lack of evidence. Démafouth fled to France, where he remained in exile for six years. During this period, the government of President François Bozizé named Démafouth as a suspect in the murder of five aides to former president, André Kolingba, himself charged in absentia with the 2001 coup attempt.

== Presidential bid ==
Démafouth enrolled from exile as an Independent, as one of a dozen candidates in the 13 March 2005 presidential elections. On 30 December 2004, the transitional constitutional court ruled that Démafouth and six other candidates would be excluded from running for various reasons. In rejecting the candidacy of Jean-Jacques Démafouth, it said that there was a conflict between the date of birth given on his birth certificate (October 3, 1950) and that given in his declaration of candidacy and criminal record (October 3, 1959). The other candidates who were rejected were Ange-Félix Patassé, Martin Ziguélé, Jean-Paul Ngoupandé, Charles Massi, Olivier Gabirault, and Pasteur Josué Binoua. Later, however, Démafouth was allowed to stand. He received 11,279 votes, or 1.27%, in the first round.

== Leader of the APRD ==
In 2008 Démafouth was elected president of the CAR rebel group People's Army for the Restoration of Democracy (APRD). Démafouth reported that he did not seek the post, and only accepted it as a civilian leader on the condition that "the APRD must agree to an inclusive political dialogue and sign a peace accord with the Bangui authorities." President Bozizé had proposed this "inclusive dialogue" process on 8 October 2007.

== 2008 peace talks ==
After extensive negotiation, Démafouth returned to the CAR in December 2008 to lead the APRD delegation to President Bozizé's Inclusive Political Dialogue (IPD). He was joined by APRD spokesman Bienvenue Dokoto, and APRD military leader Colonel Lakoye Maradas. The IPD was meant to the start of a peace and reconciliation process between rebel groups, oppositions parties, civil society, and the government. Participants in this 12-day conference included Former President Patassé, a civilian opposition umbrella called the United Stakeholders Force (UFVN), the Democratic Front for the central African people (FDPC) rebels, and the Central African Liberation Movement for Justice (MLCJ) rebels. Planned for several months, the APRD and others had walked out of planning for the IPD in October 2008 over concerns about proposed amnesty laws. An agreement on the IPD was finally reached with the mediation of Gabonese President Omar Bongo. The December meetings agreed a plan to form a multi-party government of national unity and to prepare for elections in 2010, along with a nationwide "truth and reconciliation" commission.

On 30 December 2009, Démafouth represented the APRD at a reconciliation ceremony in Paoua, Ouham-Pendé, CAR. Démafouth addressed government, rebel, NGO, and civil society leaders and "asked for forgiveness from the population of the city and announced that all the barriers erected by the APRD would be lifted" allowing free travel from the north to the south of the country.

== Later career ==
In 2023, Démafouth succeeded Ruffina Mangue Obone as representative to the Economic Community of Central African States (ECCAS).
