= Mireille Kolingba =

First Lady of the Central African Republic
- In office 1 September 1981 – 22 October 1993
- President: Andre Kolingba
- Preceded by: Brigette Dacko
- Succeeded by: Angèle Patassé

Personal details
- Born: Mireille Kotalimbora; 13 November 1947 Dolisie, French Congo (now the present-day Republic of the Congo)
- Spouse: Andre Kolingba
- Children: Twelve
- Education: Université du Québec

Mireille Kotalimbora-Kolingba (born 13 November 1947) is a Central African politician who was the First Lady of the Central African Republic from 1981 to 1993 during the presidency of Andre Kolingba.

== Early life and education ==
Born in Dolisie on 13 November 1947 with the name Mireille Kotalimbora, she studied at École nationale d'administration et de magistrature and graduated in 1970. In 1977, she received a master's degree in business management from the Université du Québec.

== Career ==
In 1963, Kotalimbora worked as a freelance at Radio Centrafrique during weekends and school vacations. During her work on the radio, she met with Andre Kolingba.

Kolingba entered civil service in 1970 and worked as head of staff of the Ministry of Justice from 1971 to 1974. Returning to the Central African Republic, she was reappointed as head of staff in 1979 and later became the cabinet head of the Ministry of Justice. She founded and led a women's organization Vie et espoir, in 1986. Afterward, she was elected as an MP representing Ouango in 1998. However, following the 2001 failed coup attempt, she and her three children took refuge at the French Embassy in Bangui and later moved to France in August 2001. She returned to Bangui with her husband on 5 October 2003. In 2005, she was reelected as an MP and encouraged the people not to vote MLPC party because it led to the return of Banyamulenge who would kill, loot, and rape during 2005 election campaign. Nevertheless, she lost in the 2011 election.

== Personal life ==
Mireille Kolingba married Andre Kolingba in 1969, and the couple had 12 children. From 1975 to 1979, she lived in Canada, accompanying her husband, who worked as Central African Republic Ambassador to Canada.
