= Tchakpa M'brede =

Tchakpa M'brede was a journalist and politician from the Central African Republic.

== Early life and education ==
He was born into a peasants family in Marouba in 1949. M'brede studied at the University of Yaoundé, the University of Montreal and at the French Press Institute (Pantheon-Assas University). During 1986-1987 he studied at Boston University, as a fellow of the Hubert H. Humphrey Fellowship Program. M'brede founded the Union of Central African Journalists (UJCA).

== Career ==
M'brede was the national secretary of the Alliance for Democracy and Progress (ADP), but was expelled from the party in March 1993 for accepting the post as minister for primary and secondary education in the cabinet of Enoch Derant Lakoué.

As of 2007 he served as deputy chairman of the National Disarmament, Demobilization and Reintegration Commission (CNDDR).

== Death ==
M'brede died in 2018. At the time of his death he was the president of the Audio-Visual Commission of the High Council for Communication. President Faustin-Archange Touadéra posthumously awarded him with the Order of Central African Recognition, with the degree of commander.

== Bibliography ==
- Tchakpa M'Brede. Ma Centrafrique !: Un état assujetti, un peuple humilié. Editions Edilivre, 2016
