= Jeanne-Marie Ruth-Rolland =

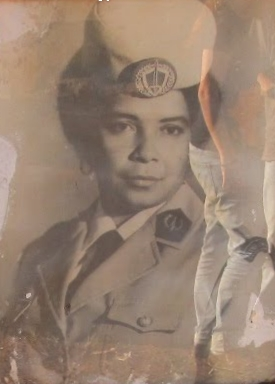

Minister for Social Affairs, the Status of Women and National Solidarity
- In office 1992–1993
- President: Ange-Félix Patassé

Personal details
- Born: June 17, 1937 Bangassou, Ubangi-Shari
- Died: June 4, 1995 (aged 57) Paris, France
- Party: Civic Forum; Central African Republican Party

Jeanne-Marie Ruth-Rolland (née Rolland) (17 June 1937 – 4 June 1995) was a Central African politician, social worker and teacher. She is regarded as the first female African presidential candidate.

== Political career ==
Ruth-Rolland began her career as the supervisor for the education system of the French territory of Ubangi-Shari in 1956 and the supervised the Central African Republic national education system following independence from France in 1960, continuing to teach until 1964. Following this she was employed as a social worker, helping street children, and as the head of army social services in the Central African Armed Forces, leaving the forces with the rank of battalion chief.

Ruth-Rolland became an advisor to the government in 1979 and later was appointed as the Minister for the Promotion of Women's Status. During this time she worked heavily with street children and was nicknamed "Aunt Ruth", a name which continued to be used throughout her life. Ruth-Rolland was the president of the Central African Red Cross. During this time she founded and lead the Central African Republican Party.

=== Diamonds Affair and imprisonment ===
As head of the Red Cross, Ruth-Rolland would later find herself at the centre of a political scandal known as the Diamonds Affair. In 1980, French President Valéry Giscard d'Estaing was criticised for previously accepting diamonds from self-styled emperor Jean-Bedel Bokassa several years earlier. In order to defend himself, Giscard d'Estaing claimed to have sold the diamonds and donated the proceeds to the Central African Red Cross. Giscard d'Estaing expected then-President David Dacko to confirm the story. However, as head of the local Red Cross society, Ruth-Rolland publicly denied the French claims. Ruth-Rolland was quickly dismissed from her post in what she described as a "coup de force" by Dacko.

In 1981 André Kolingba became president of the Central African Republic, and in October 1983, Kolingba ordered the arrest of Ruth-Rolland for her denouncement of the embezzlement of government funds by social affairs minister Gaston Gambor and water and forests minister Sébastien Guipi. Ruth-Rolland's subsequent detainment at a police station was opposed by Amnesty International. In August 1987 Ruth-Rolland was jailed for three years by a Special Jury for Political Matters for her criticism of Kolingba's corrupt government (officially "incitement"). Although released two-months early in September 1989, she was arrested again in December that year for refusing to make way for the presidential entourage. She was then detained at the National Security Company paramilitary camp until April 1991.

=== Foray into electoral politics ===
The following year, Ruth-Rolland was a candidate in the first multiparty elections and was elected deputy for the seat of Bakouma. As her own political party had not been legalised by the time of the election, she ran as the leader of the Civic Forum party. The election, however, was cancelled by Supreme Court and re-held the following year in 1993, when Ruth-Rolland was able to run under her own Central African Republican Party. She was elected despite attempts by President Kolingba to annul the ballot. Later that year she was appointed as the Minister for Social Affairs, the Status of Women and National Solidarity.

Ruth-Rolland left her ministerial position on August 22, 1993, to run as a candidate in the Central African Republic general election, being the first woman in Africa to run for president. Despite popularity as a candidate, she was not elected, acquiring 1% of votes. Following the election she resumed her position as deputy of Bakouma and ran a gold prospector's consortium in the eastern regions of the country.

== Personal life and death ==
Jeanne-Marie Ruth-Rolland's paternal father was French and her mother was from the Nzakara people. Since her birth father died when she was young, the Bandia paramount chief, Sultan Amiel Sayo, became her stepfather. She married a French arms dealer from Bangui with whom she had five children. She was an avid diamond-collector and pursued this hobby in her later years.

In her final years, Ruth-Rolland became ill and was evacuated to Paris, France, where she died, aged 58, in hospital on June 4, 1995. The cause of her death was not given.

In her obituary, French newspaper Le Monde wrote that Ruth-Rolland "left her mark on Central African political life by her outspokenness." A memorial has been erected in Bakouma in her honor.
