= 1992 Central African general election =

Election of André Kolingba

- 25 October 1992
President before election
André Kolingba
RDC
President after
Election results annulled
André Kolingba (RDC) remains president

General elections were held in the Central African Republic on 25 October 1992 to elect a president and National Assembly. They were the first elections to be held after multi-party democracy was restored in 1991. They were also the first multiparty parliamentary elections held in the country since independence in 1960.

Incumbent president André Kolingba, who had led the country since a 1981 coup, finished last in the presidential elections. However, the results of both elections were annulled by the Supreme Court due to widespread irregularities. Fresh elections were held the following year.
