= People's Union for the Republic =

The People's Union for the Republic (French: Union Populaire pour la République, UPR) is a political party in the Central African Republic.

== History ==
In the parliamentary elections in 1998 the UPR was part of the Union of Forces for Peace (UFAP), which opposed President Ange-Félix Patassé. The party won a single seat, and UFAP gained a majority of 55 of the 109 seats in the National Assembly. However, the ruling Movement for the Liberation of the Central African People was able to form a government after the defection of a UFAP MP.
