= National Convention (Central African Republic) =

Political party

National Convention (French: Convention Nationale, CN) was a political party in the Central African Republic led by David Galiambo.

== History ==
The party was established in October 1991. In the 1993 general elections it won three seats in the National Assembly.

The party did not win a seat in the 1998 parliamentary elections, but held a ministerial post in the governments of Anicet-Georges Dologuélé and Martin Ziguélé between 1999 and 2003.
