= Liberal Democratic Party (Central African Republic) =

Political party in the Central African Republic

The Liberal Democratic Party (French: Parti Libéral-Démocrate, PLD) is a political party in the Central African Republic.

== History ==
The PLD was established in 1991. In the 1993 general elections it won seven seats in the National Assembly, becoming the joint third-largest faction. Following the elections it became part of a coalition government headed by Jean-Luc Mandaba of the Movement for the Liberation of the Central African People (MLPC).

In the next parliamentary elections in 1998 the PLD was part of the Presidential Movement, but was reduced to two seats. The party again allied itself with the MLPC, which was able to form a government after the defection of an opposition MP. The PLD was given four ministerial posts in the government led by Anicet-Georges Dologuélé. It was also part of the government formed by Martin Ziguélé in April 2001.

The party was part of the National Convergence "Kwa Na Kwa" alliance for the 2005 elections. The alliance won four seats, of which the PLD took three.

In 2010 the PLD joined the Presidential Majority alliance in preparation for the 2011 general elections. The party nominated 15 candidates for the National Assembly elections, and although the alliance won 11 seats, the PLD failed to win a seat.
