= Congress of Central African Social Democrats =

Political party in the Central African Republic

The Congress of Central African Social Democrats (French: Congrès des Sociaux Démocratiques Centrafricains, CSDC) is a political party in the Central African Republic.

== History ==
Established in 1999, the party ran in an alliance with the Social Democratic Party for the 2005 general elections. The alliance won a single seat.

In 2010 the party joined the Presidential Majority alliance in preparation for the 2011 general elections. The CSDC nominated only one candidate for the 105 seats in the National Assembly, and although the alliance won 11 seats, the CSDC failed to win a seat.
