= 1993 Central African general election =

Election of Ange-Félix Patassé

- Presidential election
- 22 August 1993 (first round); 19 September 1993 (second round)
- Turnout: 68.47% (first round); 56.05% (second round)
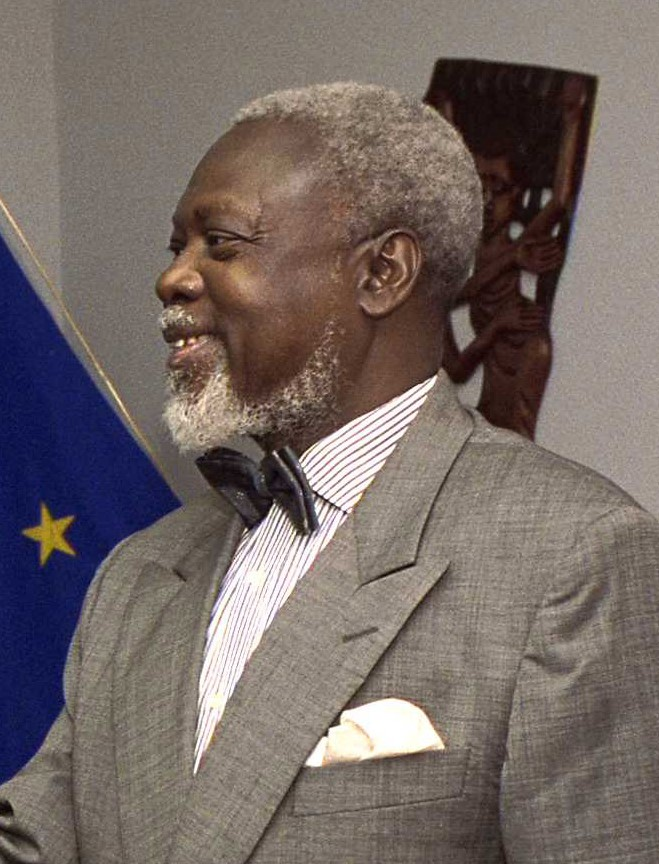

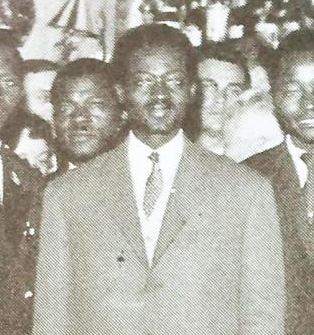
Nominee	Ange-Félix Patassé	Abel Goumba
Party	MLPC	FPP
Popular vote	363,297	315,935
Percentage	53.49%	46.51%
President before election
André Kolingba
RDC
Elected President
Ange-Félix Patassé
MLPC
- Parliamentary election
- All 85 seats in the National Assembly; 43 seats needed for a majority
- Turnout: 67.93% (first round); 56.05% (second round)
Party	Leader	Seats
MLPC	Ange-Félix Patassé	34
RDC	André Kolingba	13
FPP	Abel Goumba	7
PLD	Nestor Kombot-Naguemon	7
ADP	Clément Bélibanga	6
MDD	David Dacko	6
CN	David Galiambo	3
PSD	Enoch Derant Lakoué	3
MDREC	Joseph Bendounga	1
PRC	Jeanne-Marie Ruth-Rolland	1
FC	Timothée Malendoma	1
MESAN	Prosper Lavodrama; Joseph Ngbangadibo	1
Independents		2
This lists parties that won seats. See the complete results below.
Prime Minister before	Prime Minister after
Enoch Derant Lakoué; PSD	Jean-Luc Mandaba; MLPC

General elections were held to in the Central African Republic on 22 August 1993, with a second round on 19 September 1993. They followed the previous year's elections, the results of which had been voided by the Supreme Court due to irregularities.

The presidential elections were won by Ange-Félix Patassé of the Movement for the Liberation of the Central African People, who defeated Patriotic Front for Progress leader Abel Goumba in the second round. Incumbent president André Kolingba was eliminated in the first round, winning only 12% of the vote. When it became apparent that Kolingba was headed for defeat, he attempted to cling to power by issuing two decrees on 28 August that changed the composition of the Supreme Court and amended the electoral code, which would have allowed the results to be manipulated. However, Kolingba repealed the decrees under heavy pressure from France. The National Assembly election results also saw a victory for the MLPC, which won 34 of the 85 seats, short of a majority. Kolingba's party, the Central African Democratic Rally–the only legally permitted party from 1986 to 1992–finished second, with 13 seats.

When Patassé took office on 22 October, it marked the first—and to date, only—time since the Central African Republic gained independence that an incumbent government peacefully transferred power to the opposition.

== Electoral system ==
The President was elected using the two-round system, with a run-off held after no candidate received a majority of the vote in the first round.

The 85 members of the National Assembly were elected from single-member constituencies, also using the two-round system.

== Results ==
=== President ===
Candidate	Party	First round		Second round	
Candidate	Party	Votes	%	Votes	%
Ange-Félix Patassé	Movement for the Liberation of the Central African People	302,004	38.03	363,297	53.49
Abel Goumba	Patriotic Front for Progress	175,467	22.10	315,935	46.51
David Dacko	David Dacko Movement	162,721	20.49		
André Kolingba	Central African Democratic Rally	97,942	12.33		
Enoch Derant Lakoué	Social Democratic Party	19,368	2.44		
Timothée Malendoma	Civic Forum	16,400	2.07		
François Bozizé	Independent	12,159	1.53		
Jeanne-Marie Ruth Rolland	Central African Republican Party	8,068	1.02		
Total		794,129	100.00	679,232	100.00
Valid votes		793,971	98.11	679,235	98.07
Invalid/blank votes		15,317	1.89	13,362	1.93
Total votes		809,288	100.00	692,597	100.00
Registered voters/turnout		1,181,874	68.47	1,235,568	56.05
Source: EISA (Note: In the first round the reported number of valid votes was less than the total of votes cast for the eight candidates; in the second round, the reported number of valid votes was higher than the total of votes cast for the two candidates.)

=== National Assembly ===
Party	First round		Second round		Total seats
Party	Votes	%	Votes	%	Total seats
Movement for the Liberation of the Central African People					34
Central African Democratic Rally					13
Patriotic Front for Progress					7
Liberal Democratic Party					7
Alliance for Democracy and Progress					6
David Dacko Movement					6
National Convention					3
Social Democratic Party					3
Democratic Movement for the Renaissance and Evolution of Central Africa					1
Central African Republican Party					1
Civic Forum					1
Movement for the Social Evolution of Black Africa					1
Independents					2
Total					85
Valid votes	793,981	98.11	679,235	98.07	
Invalid/blank votes	15,317	1.89	13,362	1.93	
Total votes	809,298	100.00	692,597	100.00	
Registered voters/turnout	1,191,374	67.93	1,235,568	56.05	
Source: EISA
