= 1986 Central African constitutional referendum =

- 21 November 1986

Results
Choice	Votes	%
Yes	696,055	92.22%
No	58,752	7.78%
Valid votes	754,807	98.87%
Invalid or blank votes	8,644	1.13%
Total votes	763,451	100.00%
Registered voters/turnout	871,395	87.61%

A constitutional referendum was held in the Central African Republic on 21 November 1986, following a military coup in 1981. The new constitution would make the country a one-party state with the Central African Democratic Rally as the sole legal party. The presidential term was to be set at six years, with no term limits. Under its provisions, André Kolingba, who had led the military regime since 1981, was automatically elected as president. It was approved by 92.22% of voters with an 87.6% turnout.

Following the referendum, parliamentary elections took place in July 1987.

== Results ==
Choice	Votes	%
For	696,055	92.22
Against	58,752	7.78
Invalid/blank votes	8,644	–
Total	763,451	100
Registered voters/turnout	871,395	87.61
Source: African Elections Database
