= Movement for Unity, Peace and Security =

Political party in the Central African Republic

The Movement for Unity, Peace and Security (French: Mouvement pour l'Unité, la Paix et la Sécurité, MUPS) was a political party in the Central African Republic.

== History ==
The party joined the National Convergence "Kwa Na Kwa" alliance for the 2005 general elections. The alliance won 42 seats, of which MUPS won one.

Several Kwa Na Kwa factions merged into a single political party in August 2009.
