= 1987 Central African parliamentary election =

Parliamentary elections were held in the Central African Republic on 31 July 1987, the first since 1964. The country was a one-party state at the time following a referendum the previous year, with the Central African Democratic Rally as the sole legal party. The party put forward 142 candidates for the 52 seats in the National Assembly. Voter turnout was around 50%.

== Results ==
Party	Seats
Central African Democratic Rally	52
Total	52
Source: IPU
