= Party for Democracy in Central Africa =

Political party in the Central African Republic

The Party for Democracy in Central Africa (French: Parti pour la Démocratie en Centrafrique, PDCA) is a political party in the Central African Republic.

== History ==
Established on 22 February 2004, the party joined the National Convergence "Kwa Na Kwa" alliance for the 2005 general elections. The alliance won 42 seats, of which the PDCA won eight. Several Kwa Na Kwa factions merged into a single political party in August 2009, but the PDCA remained a separate party.

In 2010 the party joined the Presidential Majority alliance in preparation for the 2011 general elections. The PDCA nominated 40 candidates for the 105 seats in the National Assembly, winning one of the alliance's 11 seats.
