= Joseph Bendounga =

Central African opposition politician (1954–2025)

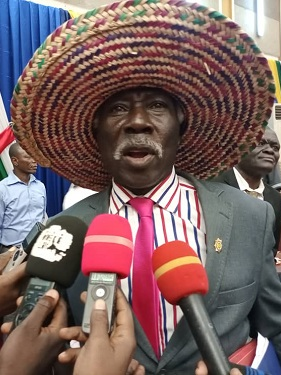
- Bendounga in 2021

Minister of Livestock and Animal Industries
- In office 12 June 2013 – 15 December 2013
- President: Michel Djotodia
- Prime Minister: Nicolas Tiangaye
- Preceded by: Himself (delegate for rural development, responsible for livestock)
- Succeeded by: Mahamat Tahîb Yakoub (delegate for Livestock)

Minister delegate for rural development, responsible for livestock
- In office 9 February 2013 – 12 June 2013
- President: François Bozizé; Michel Djotodia
- Prime Minister: Nicolas Tiangaye
- Preceded by: Youssoufa Yérima Mandjo (Delegate to the Minister of Agriculture and Rural Development in charge of Livestock and Animal Health)
- Succeeded by: Himself (Livestock and Animal Industries)

Mayor of Bangui
- In office 1997 – 6 February 2000
- Preceded by: Olivier Gabirault
- Succeeded by: Cécile Guéret

Personal details
- Born: 17 March 1954 Bocaranga, Ubangi-Shari, French Equatorial Africa
- Died: 5 January 2025 (aged 70) Bangui, Central African Republic
- Party: MDREC
- Education: University of Bangui

Joseph Bendounga (17 March 1954 – 5 January 2025), nicknamed Joe Ben, was a Central African politician. He was known for his vocal opposition to every administration of the country since Ange-Félix Patassé, which led to him having been arrested several times.

== Early life and education ==
Bendounga was born on 17 March 1954, in Bocaranga. He studied law at the University of Bangui.

== Political career ==
=== 1990–2003 ===
Bendounga founded MDREC in 1990. He was then arrested due to political reasons. In 1997, Ange-Félix Patassé appointed Bendounga as the Mayor of Bangui, a position he held until his resignation in 2000. Upon stepping down as mayor, he joined the opposition by becoming the leader of Collectif démocratique des partis d'opposition (CODEPO).

Due to his opposition to the government, he was informed that he was prohibited from leaving the country at the Bangui M'Poko International Airport, from where he was attempting to email for Douala on 24 January 2003. On receiving this news, Bendounga kicked and destroyed some of the airport's formalities hall windows, leading the police to arrest him and hold him in the airport prison. Afterward, he was moved to Ngaragba Central Prison and shortly after he was released. He condemned the 2003 coup.

=== 2004–2012 ===
After François Bozizé took power by ousting Patasse, Bendounga declared his opposition to the transition government. Approaching the 2005 election, he announced his presidential candidacy through MDREC. Nevertheless, he then withdrew from the candidacy due to MDREC's inability to pay a 5 million CFA franc deposit. Afterwards, he said that he did not support any candidates in the election since they were involved in the 2003 Central African Republic coup d'état.

Bendounga called Bozize to resign from the presidency on 22 March 2006 due to his mismanagement. He attended the political meeting with President Bozize that was aired live at Renaissance Palace on 19 October 2010. Soon afterward, Bozize ordered his guard to expel Bendounga from the room as he attacked him during the live meeting. On 22 August 2011, he issued a petition to the President of the Constitutional Court requesting the court to examine Bozize's health as he suffered from an incurable migraine. However, the court rejected his demand as it only accepted the impeachment request.

=== Minister of Livestock and Animal Industries (2013) ===
On 9 January, Bendounga was appointed the Minister Delegate for Rural Development, responsible for livestock after the formation of the national unity government. Later, on 13 June 2013, he became the minister of Livestock and Animal Industries. As a minister of Livestock and Animal Industries, he signed a contract with a Moroccan farm to import 20,000 chicks and transport them to the country every 5,000 chicks per shipment on behalf of the government and met the Moroccan Agriculture minister to solve the logistical issues.

Although he served as a minister, he still had a critical stance towards the government led by Michel Djotodia. On 12 October 2013, he said that MDREC withdrew from CAR'S Democratic Opposition. Djotodia fired Bendounga as minister of Livestock and Animal Industries on 15 December 2013.

Several days after resigning from Minister of Livestock and Animal Industries, while walking in the city center, thugs equipped with knives attacked and attempted to assassinate Bendounga. He then immediately ran towards the internet cafe on La Paix's ground floor and sought refuge there. Later, the Congolese contingent of MISCA evacuated him from the internet cafe to the Congolese chancellery.

=== 2014–2020 ===
On 19 February 2015, during a press conference, Bendounga questioned the proposal of the National Transitional Council's constitution which it would ignite a political crisis as some presidential candidates who were against the NTC president and its cronies would not be allowed to participate in the election.

Bendounga supported Faustin-Archange Touadéra at the beginning of his presidency. However, he eventually became an opponent of Touadéra's government. On 13 September 2017, he criticized Simplice Sarandji for including former rebels in the cabinet. In November 2017, he appealed to the Council of State for the annulment of four decrees issued by the president on the prefects and sub-prefects and the inclusion of former armed groups' representative to Sarandji's cabinet. Nevertheless, the council rejected his plea.

On 10 May 2018, Bendounga organized a demonstration that denounced the deterioration of Bangui's security situation, and thousands attended it. The police soon diffused the demonstration, and they briefly detained Bendounga. He then planned for another demonstration demanding the lifting of the arms embargo against the CAR government and the rehabilitation of the FACA. However, the government did not approve it and Bendounga was briefly rearrested again. In reaction to the 2018 Alindao massacre, he called for the boycott of 1 December parade since it was unethical to celebrate the event as the residents who settle in the rebel's control suffered. He called Touadera's DDR plan of armed groups in Paoua a joke since they refused that initiative.

Bendounga issued a three-month ultimatum to Touadera to change his policies and threatened to bring him to the High Court of Justice for treason if he did not do it on 17 January 2019. He found that Touadera did not fulfill the promise that he made during the campaign and violated the constitution by including armed group representatives in the government. On 2 April, he brought Touadera to the high court for violating the constitution, and yet the petition was dismissed by the judges. He criticized the draft electoral code on 20 March 2019, which threatened democracy. He then was arrested on 15 June 2019 and detained for four days because he attended the opposition meeting. During the detention, the guards beat him. Afterward, he left United Front to defend the Fatherland E Zingo Biani. He appealed the prime minister's Decree No. 058 on the establishment of the Strategic Support Committee for the Electoral Process to the Constitutional Court on 27 November. However, the court rejected his appeal, claiming that it was unfounded.

On 20 January 2020, Bendounga filed a request to the constitutional court to revoke the decree for establishing the General Delegation of Public Works, and the court annulled it. He prosecuted Touadera, Samba-Panza, Djotodia, and Bozize for being responsible for the country's decline in September 2020. On 6 November 2020, he approached the Constitutional Court and demanded the return of deposits paid by candidates for the legislative and presidential elections since it was against the constitution. Few hours before the announcement of final lists of the presidential candidates, on 2 December 2020, he sued Bozizé, Samba-Panza, and Touadera to the constitutional court to disqualify them running at the election. Previously, on 27 November 2020, he filed a request to the Constitutional Court to invalidate the candidates from armed groups.

=== Member of National Assembly (2021–2025) ===
In the 2021 election, he ran as the MP candidate representing the Bimbo 3 constituency from the MDREC party and won a seat. Upon becoming the MP, he ran for the President of the National Assembly election with Simplice Sarandji and Martin Ziguélé and only received 1 vote. During the Radio Ndeke Luka's show on 28 May 2022, he attacked Touadera's security policy for deploying most of FACA soldiers in Bangui to protect the regime. On 13 July 2022, he asked the constitutional court to abort the proposed amendment of the Constitution of 30 March 2016, as he believed it was "unconstitutional". However, the constitutional court judges rejected his request and called it "premature".

Bendounga opposed the 2023 referendum, believing that it was a way for Touadera to "cling to power and change the rules of the democratic game in the Central African Republic" and urged people to stay at home during the vote. He also believed that constitution revision could not take place amidst the country's situation that was marred by instability. On 23 June 2023, he launched another appeal of electoral body held by Touadera to the Council of State since it did not follow the law. Nevertheless, the council turned down his request. In January 2024, he was against the new electoral code that was passed for not allowing municipal and regional elections held in pastoral communes.

Although he was critical of the Touadera government, he condemned Alexandre-Ferdinand Nguendet 's attempted coup by force and suggested to Nguendet to use peaceful means instead.

== Personal life and death ==
Bendounga was a karate master and belonged to the Kaba ethnic group. He was also the founder of the Central African Taekwondo Federation.

Bendounga died in the Sino-Central African Friendship Hospital, Bangui, on 5 January 2025, after two weeks of medical treatment. He was 70.

== Views ==
=== Abortion ===
Bendounga was against voluntary abortion and demanded the health minister ban it.

=== Cryptocurrency ===
Bendounga opposed the legalisation of bitcoin, believing it would collapse the country's economy.

=== Wagner Group ===
Bendounga called the Wagner Group "the vehicle of Russian neocolonialism" and tried to eliminate its business rival.
