= National Democratic Front (Central African Republic) =

Political party in the Central African Republic

The National Democratic Front (French: Front National Démocratique, FND) is a political party in the Central African Republic.

== History ==
Established in 1997, the party joined the National Convergence "Kwa Na Kwa" alliance for the 2005 general elections. The alliance won 42 seats, of which the FND won one.

In 2010 the FND joined the Presidential Majority alliance in preparation for the 2011 general elections. The party nominated three candidates for the 105 seats in the National Assembly, and although the alliance won 11 seats, the FND failed to win a seat.
