= National Party for a New Central Africa =

Political party in the Central African Republic

The National Party for a New Central Africa (French: Parti National pour un Centrafrique Nouveau, PNCN) is a political party in the Central African Republic.

== History ==
Established on 26 March 2004, the party joined the National Convergence "Kwa Na Kwa" alliance for the 2005 general elections. The alliance won 42 seats, of which the PNCN won seven. Following the elections, the PNCN's Cyriaque Gonda was appointed Minister of Communication and National Reconciliation in 2009.

Several Kwa Na Kwa factions merged into a single political party in August 2009, but the PNCN remained a separate party. In April 2010 Gonda was removed from the cabinet after President François Bozizé accused him of embezzling money meant for disarmament campaigns.

In late 2010 the party joined the Presidential Majority alliance in preparation for the 2011 general elections. The PNCN nominated 47 candidates for the 105 seats in the National Assembly, winning one of the alliance's 11 seats.
