= Alliance for Democracy and Progress (Central African Republic) =

Political party in the Central African Republic

The Alliance for Democracy and Progress (French: Alliance pour la Démocratie et le Progrès, ADP) is a political party in the Central African Republic.

== History ==
The party was established in October 1991. In October 1992, Jean-Claude Conjugo, then their leader, was killed by government forces during a union-organized demonstration. It won six seats in the National Assembly in the 1993 general elections, and joined Jean-Luc Mandaba's coalition government.

In the next parliamentary elections in 1998 the ADP was part of the Union of Forces for Peace (UFAP), which opposed President Ange-Félix Patassé. The ADP won five seats, and UFAP gained a majority of 55 of the 109 seats in the National Assembly. However, the ruling Movement for the Liberation of the Central African People was able to form a government after the defection of a UFAP MP.

The 2005 general elections saw the ADP win two seats, whilst its presidential candidate Olivier Gabirault finished last in a field of 11 candidates with 0.6% of the vote. The party put forward nine candidates for the National Assembly in the 2011 general elections, but failed to win a seat.
