= Movement for the Social Evolution of Black Africa–Boganda =

Political party in the Central African Republic

The Movement for the Social Evolution of Black Africa–Boganda (French: Mouvement de l'Évolution Sociale en Afrique Noire–Boganda, MESAN–Boganda) is a political party in the Central African Republic.

== History ==
The party was established in February 1993.

In 2010 it joined the Presidential Majority alliance in preparation for the 2011 general elections. MESAN-Boganda nominated five candidates for the 105 seats in the National Assembly, winning one of the alliance's 11 seats.

== See also ==
- Movement for the Social Evolution of Black Africa
