= Émile Gros Raymond Nakombo =

Central African politician

Mayor of Bangui
- Incumbent
- Assumed office 6 May 2016
- Preceded by: Hyacinthe Wodobodé

Personal details
- Born: 3 December 1956 (age 69) Berbérati, Ubangi-Shari
- Party: RDC
- Education: Bucharest Academy of Economic Studies

Émile Gros Raymond Nakombo (born 3 December 1956) is a Central African politician currently serving as the mayor of Bangui since 2016.

== Early life and education ==
Nakombo was born to a political family on 3 December 1956 in Berbérati. He studied at Saint André de Berbérati and Saint Paul de Bangui seminaries. Afterward, he continued his higher education at the University of Bangui and then at Bucharest Academy of Economic Studies, taking economics and management in 1979.

== Career ==
=== Professional career ===
Nakombo has held several positions, such as Deputy Director General of the Moroccan-Central African People's Bank (BPMC) and administrator-manager of the Compagnie d’Exploitation des Tabacs de Centrafrique-Cameroun (CETAC).

=== Political career ===
Nakombo began his political journey by joining pro-Kolingba party, RDC. In 1998, he was elected as an MP representing Berbérati. Five years later, he was reelected as an MP representing the same constituency. However, during the 2005 election, he replaced his electoral district from Berbérati to Sosso-Nakombo and won a seat in the parliament. In 2011, he ran for the presidential election as the RDC candidate and placed fourth. He then made another run as an independent candidate for the 2016 election and did not win. During the second round of the 2016 election, he endorsed Touadéra.

=== Mayor of Bangui ===
Touadéra appointed Nakombo as the mayor of Bangui on 5 May 2016. Under his tenure, Bangui was chosen as the host for "City and HIV" project that aimed to overcome HIV/AIDS problem. Other than that, as the city's population grew rapidly, he created a Bangui master plan to tackle various issues from urbanization, and sanitation to insecurity. Additionally, Nakombo successfully solved the town's hall retiree issues that have persisted since 1972 by paying them the retirement fund. He also tried to solve the waste problem through donors from AFD, EU, and the World Bank, although it bore little fruit due to the lack of funds. Likewise, he is the president of the Network of Mayors of Central Africa, Member of the Pan-African Council of UCLG Africa, Member of the Association of Francophone Mayors (AIMF).

Nevertheless, his administration marred scandals and controversies. He was accused of money embezzlement and nepotism. Furthermore, arrears of the town's civil servants' salaries were also common during his administration. Two MP members called for Nakombo's resignation due to his incompetency.
