= 1999 Central African presidential election =

Re-election of Ange-Félix Patassé

- 19 September 1999
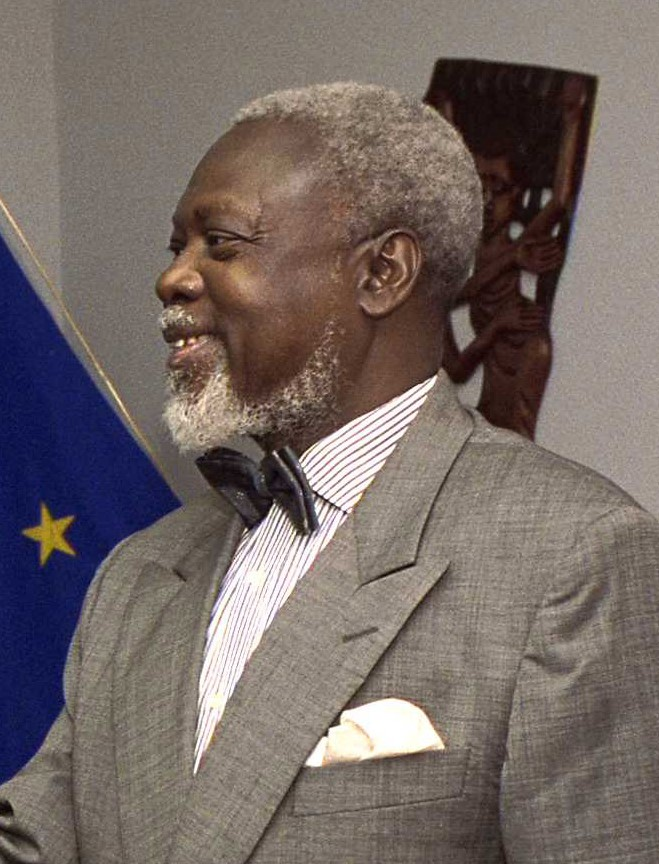

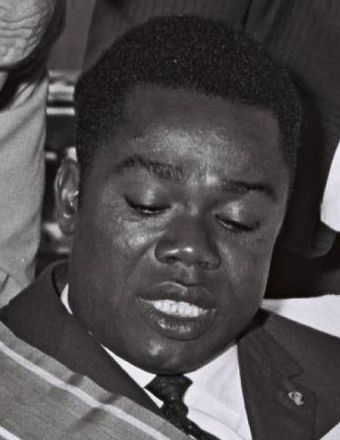

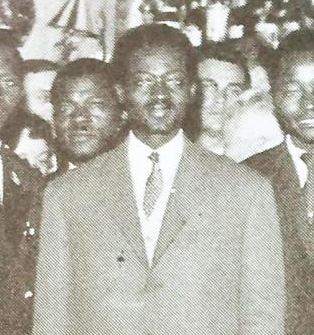
Nominee	Ange-Félix Patassé	André Kolingba
Party	MLPC	RDC
Popular vote	517,993	194,486
Percentage	51.33%	19.27%
Nominee	David Dacko	Abel Goumba
Party	MDD	FPP
Popular vote	111,868	66,218
Percentage	11.09%	6.56%
President before election
Ange-Félix Patassé
MLPC
Elected President
Ange-Félix Patassé
MLPC

Presidential elections were held in the Central African Republic on 19 September 1999. The result was a victory for incumbent President Ange-Félix Patassé of the Movement for the Liberation of the Central African People, who received 51% of the vote in the first round, meaning that a second round was not required. Voter turnout was 59%.

Prior to Constitutional Court head Édouard Frank announcing the results, all nine opposition candidates rejected the outcome, claiming the elections were rigged. However, international observers stated that any malpractice was not enough to have changed the results.

The elections were delayed by three weeks.

== Results ==
Candidate	Party	Votes	%
Ange-Félix Patassé	Movement for the Liberation of the Central African People	517,993	51.33
André Kolingba	Central African Democratic Rally	194,486	19.27
David Dacko	Movement for Democracy and Development	111,868	11.09
Abel Goumba	Patriotic Front for Progress	66,218	6.56
Henri Pouzère	Independent	42,038	4.17
Jean-Paul Ngoupandé	National Unity Party	31,952	3.17
Enoch Derant Lakoué	Social Democratic Party	13,344	1.32
Charles Massi	Democratic Forum for Modernity	13,143	1.30
Fidèle Gouandjika	Independent	9,431	0.93
Joseph Abossolo	Independent	8,626	0.85
Total		1,009,099	100.00
Valid votes		1,003,304	99.26
Invalid/blank votes		7,440	0.74
Total votes		1,010,744	100.00
Registered voters/turnout		1,709,086	59.14
Source: EISA (Note: The number of valid votes was reported to be 1,003,304, 5,795 less than the total number of votes received by each candidate.)
