= Social Democratic Party (Central African Republic) =

Political party in the Central African Republic

- President: Enoch Derant Lakoué
- Founded: 1991
- Headquarters: Bangui
- Ideology: Social democracy Ecologism
- Political position: Centre-left
- International affiliation: Socialist International

The Social Democratic Party (French: Parti Social Démocratique, PSD) is a political party in the Central African Republic.

== History ==
Established in 1991, the party won three seats in the National Assembly in the 1993 general elections, whilst its presidential candidate, Enoch Derant Lakoué, finished fifth out of eight candidates with 2.4% of the vote. In the 1998 parliamentary elections the PSD won six seats. Lakoué was the party's candidate again in the 1999 presidential elections, finishing seventh out of ten candidates with 1.3% of the vote. The party subsequently recognised the victory of President Ange-Félix Patassé, isolating itfrom the rest of the opposition.

In the 2005 general elections the party was part of the Consultation of Opposition Political Parties alliance. The alliance won 11 seats in the National Assembly, of which the PSD took five.

In 2010 the party joined the Presidential Majority alliance in preparation for the 2011 general elections. The party nominated 41 candidates for the 105 seats in the National Assembly, and although the alliance won 11 seats, the PSD failed to win a seat.
