= Democratic Forum for Modernity =

Political party in the Central African Republic

- President: Charles Massi
- Secretary-General: Stéphane Pentchoaki
- Founded: 27 November 1997
- Headquarters: Bangui
- Ideology: Liberalism

Website
- http://www.fodem.org/

The Democratic Forum for Modernity (French: Forum Démocratique pour la Modernité, FODEM) is a political party in the Central African Republic.

== History ==
The party was founded by Charles Massi on 27 November 1997 and legally recognized on 4 May 1998. In the 1998 parliamentary elections it won two seats in the National Assembly. Massi was the party's candidate for the 1999 presidential elections, finishing eighth out of ten candidates with 1.3% of the vote.

In the first round of the presidential elections held on 13 March 2005, Massi won 3.2% of the vote. He backed François Bozizé in the second round and became a Minister of State in the government after the elections. In the simultaneous National Assembly elections, the party was reduced to a single seat.

After Massi was appointed as Political Coordinator of the Union of Democratic Forces for the Rally (UFDR) rebel group, FODEM rejected this move and expelled Massi from the party; it established a provisional political bureau on 22 May 2008 with Joseph Garba Ouangolé as President.

In 2010, FODEM joined the Presidential Majority alliance in preparation for the 2011 general elections. The party nominated six candidates for the 105 seats in the National Assembly, and although the alliance won 11 seats, FODEM failed to win a seat.
