= 2005 Central African general election =

Election of François Bozizé

- Presidential election
- 13 March 2005 (first round); 8 May 2005 (second round)
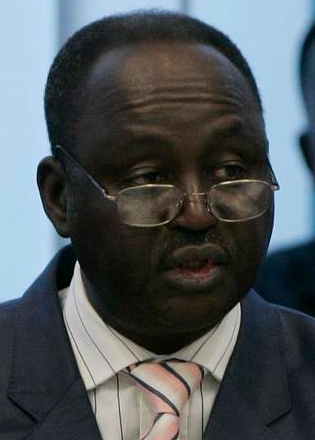

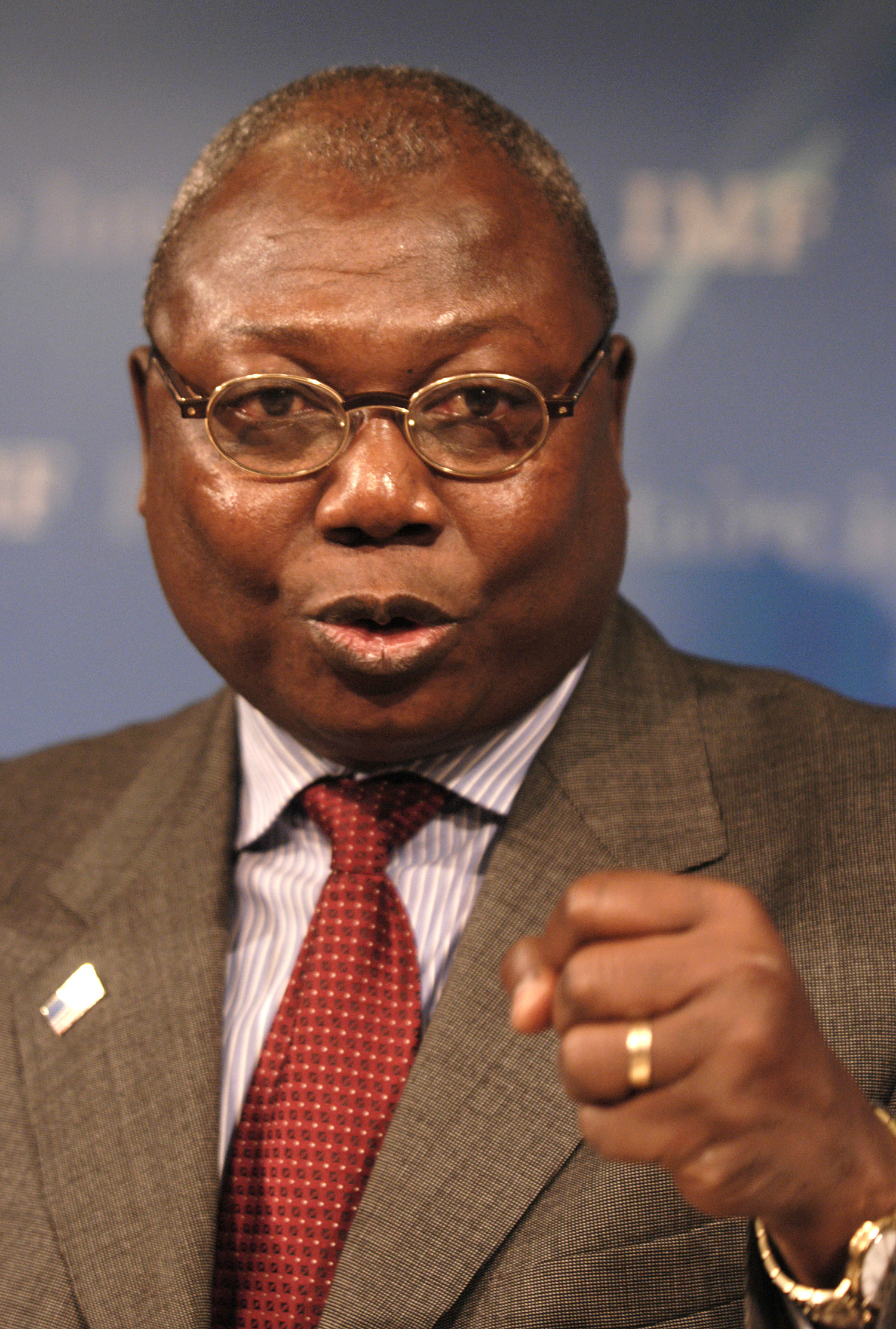
Nominee	François Bozizé	Martin Ziguélé
Party	Independent	MLPC
Popular vote	610,903	334,716
Percentage	64.60%	35.40%
President before election
François Bozizé
Independent
Elected President
François Bozizé
Independent

General elections were held in the Central African Republic on March 13, 2005 to elect the President and National Assembly. A second round was held for both elections on May 8, marking the end of the transitional process that began with the seizure of power by François Bozizé in a March 2003 coup, overthrowing President Ange-Félix Patassé. A new constitution was approved in a referendum in December 2004 and took effect the same month.

The presidential elections saw Bozizé attempt to win a five-year term after two years as transitional leader, alongside ten other candidates, with Patassé excluded from running. As no candidate received over 50% of the vote in the first round, a runoff was held between Bozizé and former Prime Minister Martin Ziguélé, resulting in a victory for Bozizé, who received 64.6% of the vote. He was inaugurated on 11 June.

In the simultaneous parliamentary elections, the National Convergence "Kwa Na Kwa" party emerged as the largest in the National Assembly, winning 42 of the 105 seats, whilst the Movement for the Liberation of the Central African People emerged as the second-largest party with 12 seats.

== Background ==
The elections had originally been planned for December 2004 or January 2005, with the election date announced on August 28, 2004: January 30, 2005, with a run-off date of February 27. The elections were, however, subsequently delayed to February 13 by a decree of president Bozizé in mid-December 2004. In late January 2005, they were delayed further by one month to March 13. They were held on this date, and the second round of the elections, initially scheduled for May 1, took place on May 8.

== Candidates ==
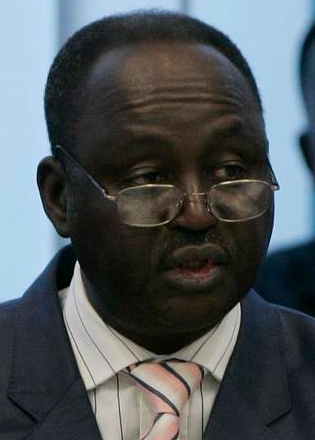
François Bozizé

After taking power with the seizure of the capital, Bangui, on March 15, 2003, Bozizé said that his rule was a transitional period, and that he would step down at the end of the transition. In 2004, however, speculation increased that he intended to run in the presidential election that would mark the end of the transition, with many of his supporters calling on him to run. Eventually, following a referendum on a new constitution on December 5, 2004, Bozizé announced his candidacy in the presidential election as an independent candidate on December 11, 2004, while speaking to supporters. He cited what he considered the will of the people in his decision:

After thinking thoroughly, and being deeply convinced and keeping in mind the nation's interest, I grasped the deep sense of my people's calls. As a citizen, I'll take my responsibility.
I'll contest the election to achieve the task of rebuilding the country, which is dear to me and according to your wish.

Ten other candidates also contested the presidential election, including one former president and three former prime ministers. André Kolingba, who ruled the Central African Republic from 1981 until his defeat in the 1993 election, was the candidate of the Central African Democratic Rally (Rassemblement démocratique centrafricain). He came in second in the September 1999 election, although Patassé defeated him by a wide margin. Abel Goumba also ran as the candidate of the Patriotic Front for Progress (Front patriotique pour le progrès); a long-time politician, he served as prime minister in the late 1950s and again from March to December 2003, following Bozizé's seizure of power, subsequently becoming vice-president under Bozizé until being dismissed shortly after the first round of the election. He previously ran for president in 1981, 1993, and 1999; in 1993 he came in second place and was defeated by Patassé in the run-off. Additionally, Martin Ziguélé, who was prime minister from 2001 to 2003 (Patassé's last prime minister prior to his ouster), contested the election, along with Jean-Paul Ngoupandé of the National Unity Party (Parti de l'unité nationale), who was prime minister from 1996 to 1997.

The other candidates were former defense minister Jean-Jacques Démafouth, the lawyer Henri Pouzère, who was previously a presidential candidate in 1999, then taking about 4% of the vote, Charles Massi of the Democratic Forum for Modernity (Forum démocratique pour la modernité), also a 1999 candidate, then taking a little over 1% of the vote, Olivier Gabirault of the Alliance for Democracy and Progress (l'Alliance pour la démocratie et le progrès), Auguste Boukanga of the Union for Renewal and Development (l'Union pour la Renaissance et le développement) and Pasteur Josué Binoua.

== Events and controversy ==
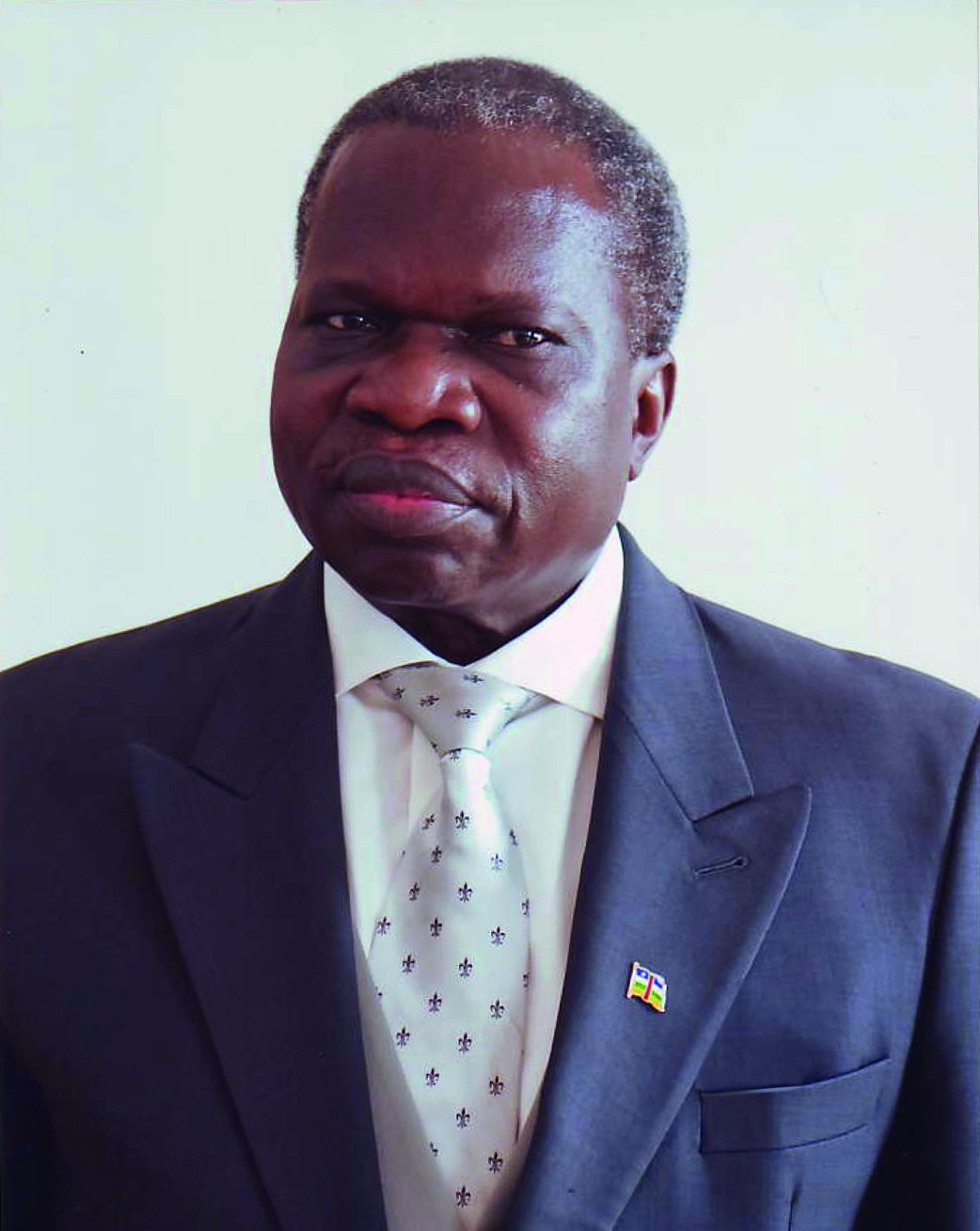
Jean Willybiro-Sako

In late March 2004, the National Transitional Council voted by a large majority in favor of a bill setting up a body to oversee the planned elections, the Commission électorale mixte indépendante (CEMI), which was initially planned to have 45 to 60 members. This was re-examined by National Transitional Council at the government's request in April 2004, and on April 30, Bozizé issued the decree promulgating it.

On May 24, 2004, Bozizé approved 30 members of CEMI who had been chosen by three groups: political parties, professional groups, and the national administration. Each of these three groups chose 10 of the members, although the country's 44 parties took some time to reach a compromise on who should be their 10 members. The 31st and last member of CEMI, its president, was not named at this time, however. The 30 members were sworn in on June 4. Jean Willybiro-Sako was subsequently chosen as president of the commission, selected out of four candidates, two of whom were nominated by the prime minister and two by the president of the National Transitional Council.

Earlier in the year, Alpha Oumar Konaré, the chairman of the commission of the African Union and former president of Mali, reportedly urged Bozizé not to stand for election. Bozizé gave an interview to Radio France Internationale on May 17 in which he refused to say whether or not he would run, but he confirmed that Konaré had spoken to him about it, while criticizing Konaré for what he called interference in the country's affairs, and wondering whether he had consulted the opinions of the Central African people before getting involved. He stressed that the matter would depend on the will of the people. Some of his supporters campaigned prominently for him to stand. About 5,000 people walked in Bangui on June 19 to support his candidacy; Bozizé thanked them and asked for time to reflect.

An electoral census was conducted from October 16 to October 29, 2004; it was initially planned to end on October 24 but was extended for several days.

In November 2004, former president Ange-Félix Patassé, who was living in exile in Togo following his 2003 ousting by Bozizé, was nominated as the presidential candidate of his party, the Movement for the Liberation of the Central African People (Mouvement pour la Libération du Peuple Centrafricain, MLPC). In December, Abel Goumba and Henri Pouzère submitted applications to run.

On December 30, the transitional constitutional court decided that all but five candidates—Bozizé, André Kolingba, Abel Goumba, Henri Pouzère, and former minister Auguste Boukanga—would be excluded from running for various reasons. Patassé was among the seven who were barred, which the court said was due to problems with his birth certificate, as well as with his land title. In rejecting the candidacy of Jean-Jacques Démafouth, it said that there was a conflict between the date of birth given on his birth certificate (October 3, 1950) and that given in his declaration of candidacy and criminal record (October 3, 1959). The other candidates who were rejected were Martin Ziguélé, Jean-Paul Ngoupandé, Charles Massi, Olivier Gabirault, and Pasteur Josué Binoua.

Prior to the court's decision, three of the 15 initial candidates had already withdrawn from the race, leaving only 12 candidacies to judge. Fidèle Gouandjika, who took less than 1% of the vote in the 1999 presidential election, withdrew in favor of Bozizé on December 23. Joseph Bendounga, a former mayor of Bangui and an opponent of Bozizé's transitional government, announced his withdrawal on the morning of December 30 because he could not pay the required guarantee of five million CFA francs; he had been named as a candidate by his party, the Democratic Movement for Renewal and Development in Central Africa, in May 2004. Enoch Dérant-Lakoué, who was prime minister for several months in 1993 and took a little more than 1% in the 1999 election, withdrew as well.

The court's decision caused controversy and was followed by demands for the annulment of the decision and the dissolution of the court. Although the chairman of the court, Marcel Malonga, reaffirmed the decision on state radio on January 3, 2005, Bozizé made a conciliatory gesture on January 4 by announcing that three of the disqualified candidates would be permitted to run: Jean-Paul Ngoupandé, Martin Ziguélé, and Charles Massi. In this decision, he invoked presidential powers available to him according to the new constitution, citing Article 22. At the same time, however, he maintained the exclusion of the remaining four candidates, and in a reference to Patassé, who is accused of stealing 70 billion CFA francs from the national treasury, he said that he thought candidates who were "the subject of judicial proceedings, for violent and economic crimes, should be permanently rejected". This did not resolve the dispute, however, and the three he approved refused to accept his validation of their candidacies, accusing Bozizé of trying to divide the opposition. All seven of the initially barred candidates continued to demand the dissolution of the court and also put forward a request for the invalidation of Bozizé's own candidacy. A few days later, Bozizé fired the justice minister, Lea Koyassoum-Doumta (also secretary-general of Ngoupandé's party), after she made a statement critical of the government. Bozizé sharply criticized the seven candidates in a speech in the city of Mobaye on January 15, which was carried on state radio, accusing them of "nothing more or less than sorcery" and "madness, bad faith, coupled with a dose of misinformation". He further said that, in contrast to them, his policy "does not aim at destroying the country, it is not based on violence, lies, betrayal, manipulation or strikes".

Amidst this tension and controversy, the seven excluded candidates, along with the originally accepted candidates Kolingba and Goumba, called for the mediation of Gabonese president Omar Bongo. On January 22, the matter was effectively resolved through the signing by Bozizé and his rivals of an agreement in Libreville, which allowed all the candidates except Patassé to participate and brought the total number of candidates to 11. According to the agreement, Patassé would remain barred because he was the subject of judicial proceedings. The date of the election was also delayed to March 13, and it was agreed that the constitutional court would not be dissolved, but that it would lose powers regarding the election, which would instead go to CEMI. Subsequently, although Patassé rejected the agreement—saying that he had not authorized Luc Apollinaire Dondon, the first vice-president of the MLPC, to sign it—the MLPC announced on January 26 that it would support the candidacy of Ziguélé, who had previously been running as an independent.

An official list of candidates, including 11 of them and excluding only Patassé, was published by the election commission on January 26, following the agreement.

Elections were also held to fill the 105 seats of the national assembly, whose members will serve five-year terms. Initially, 261 of 970 candidates were barred from running by the electoral commission on January 10, but on January 21 a court ruling permitted 219 of the 261 to run, bringing the number of candidates to 928. Bozizé's wife, Monique Bozizé, was among the 709 candidates who were initially approved on January 10.

The 2005 election marked the first time that the country's voters used a single ballot in each of the two polls, presidential and parliamentary, and an awareness campaign about this was launched on February 2, continuing until February 26. Previously, a multiple ballot system had been used in elections. Subsequently, the campaign for the elections began on the morning of February 26 and lasted until midnight on March 11.

== First round aftermath ==
Partial results (28.9% of polling stations, or 1,198 out of 4,145 stations) from the election on March 18 put Bozizé in the lead with about 55% of the votes, according to the election commission: 184,734 out of 334,732 votes counted were for Bozizé. This was over 140,000 votes more than his nearest rivals, Ziguélé and Kolingba, who took 12.86% (43,058 votes) and 12.65% (42,374 votes) of the vote respectively.

The opposition Union of Active Forces of the Nation (l'Union des forces vives de la Nation, UFVN), a grouping of Bozizé's rivals, denounced the elections on the grounds of alleged fraud and irregularities, and it called for the elections to be declared null. On the other hand, election observers endorsed the vote as free and fair.

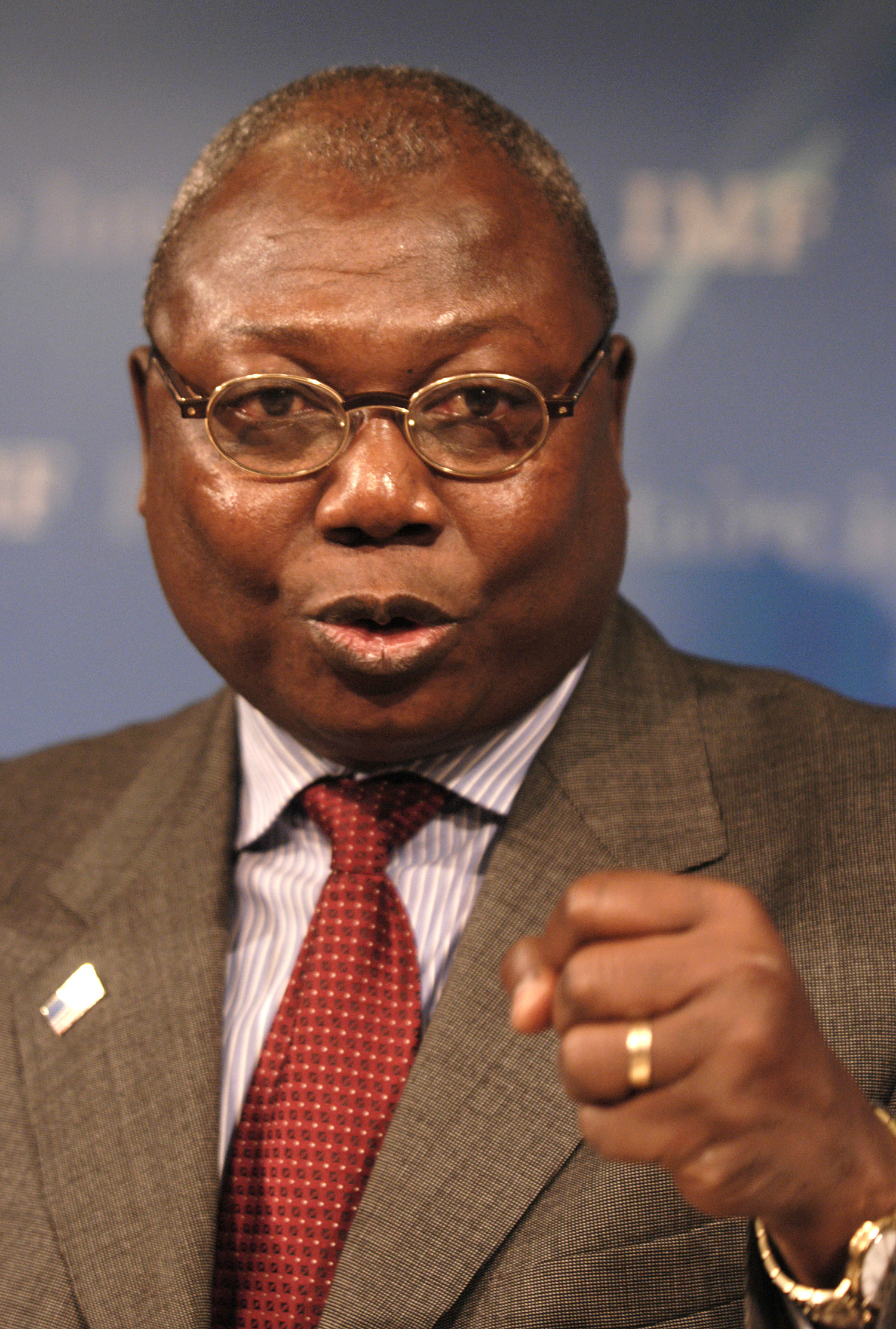
Martin Ziguélé

On March 31, official results were announced: Bozizé came in first with just under 43% of the votes, while Ziguélé came in second with 23.5%. Turnout among voters was said to have been 68.27%. Since no candidate won a majority, a second-round presidential vote was required between Bozizé and Ziguélé.

In the parliamentary election, contested by a total of 909 candidates, 17 of the 105 seats were won outright in the first round; the remainder were decided by the results of the second round. Convergence Kwa Na Kwa, the coalition supporting Bozizé, did not win any seats in the first round. Among those who did win seats were Jean-Paul Ngoupandé, also a presidential candidate, and Mireille Kolingba, the wife of presidential candidate André Kolingba. Three of the presidential candidates who were defeated in the first round, Abel Goumba, Charles Massi, and Henri Pouzère, ran in the parliamentary second round.

In voting that was taking place abroad in Paris, voters destroyed election materials and results there were cancelled as a result.

== Second round ==
The run-off between Bozizé and Ziguélé, initially scheduled to take place on May 1, was postponed to May 8. The reason for the postponement was to avoid interference with the marking of Labour Day on May 1. Campaigning took place from April 23 to May 6.

Theoretically, as all the opposition candidates (except Auguste Boukanga) were part of the UFVN, there was, based on the mathematical results of the first round, a majority against Bozizé. However, support for Ziguélé in the UFVN was not unconditional. Josué Binoua refused to endorse either candidate, while Ngoupandé, Massi and Goumba backed Bozizé. Kolingba, the third-place finisher, did not endorse either candidate.

Early results from CEMI on May 12 showed Bozizé with a strong lead. In Bangui, he was said to have received 103,446 votes, while Ziguélé took 42,959. He also was credited with 79.5% of the vote in Ombella-M'Poko province (where his wife, First Lady Monique Bozizé, also won the seat she was contesting, constituency Bimbo 2) and 93.7% in Lobaye province. Subsequently, partial results from CEMI on May 16 showed Bozizé with slightly more than 60% of the total vote, according to results from 1,698 of the country's 4,161 polling stations. The head of CEMI, Jean Willybiro-Sako, said that CEMI had 15 days from the election to make the final results public, and that the inauguration of the winner would follow 45 days after the results were proclaimed; CEMI's mandate was also to come to an end at that time.

In mid-May, there were riots in Bangui after CEMI said that the speaker of the transitional parliament (which was being replaced by the parliamentary elections), Nicolas Tiangaye, had been narrowly defeated in his constituency by a candidate of the pro-Bozizé Kwa Na Kwa. Tiangaye called for calm among his supporters "to avoid a bloodbath."

On May 24, Jean Willybiro-Sako announced that Bozizé had won the presidential election with 64.6% of the vote. Turnout in the second round was 64.63%, slightly down from the first round. Ziguélé tried to have Bozizé's victory invalidated, claiming that soldiers had forced or intimidated people into voting for Bozizé, but this was rejected by the constitutional court.

In the legislative elections, Kwa Na Kwa won the most seats in the new parliament, taking 42 out of 105. 34 independent candidates were elected. Ziguélé and Patassé's party, the MLPC, received only 11 seats, while Kolingba's party, the RDC, took eight. The Social Democratic Party took four seats, Goumba's party, the FPP, took two seats, the Alliance for Democracy took two seats, and the Londo association took one. The vote for one seat, in Boganangone in the south, was cancelled due to fraud, and another vote had to be held there.

The new parliament met for the first time on June 3. Subsequently, it elected Célestin Gaombalet, the prime minister, as its speaker. He defeated Luc-Apollinaire Dondon Konamabaye of the MLPC, receiving 78 votes against 18 for Dondon. Bozizé was sworn in on June 11 by the head of the constitutional court, Marcel Malonga. Gaombalet resigned as prime minister after Bozizé's inauguration to take up his new post, and Élie Doté was appointed to replace him.

== Results ==
=== President ===
Candidate	Party	First round		Second round	
Candidate	Party	Votes	%	Votes	%
François Bozizé	Independent	382,241	42.97	610,903	64.60
Martin Ziguélé	Movement for the Liberation of the Central African People	209,357	23.53	334,716	35.40
André Kolingba	Central African Democratic Rally	145,495	16.36		
Jean-Paul Ngoupandé	National Unity Party	45,182	5.08		
Charles Massi	Democratic Forum for Modernity	28,618	3.22		
Abel Goumba	Patriotic Front for Progress	22,297	2.51		
Henri Pouzère	Independent	18,647	2.10		
Josué Binoua	Independent	13,559	1.52		
Jean-Jacques Démafouth	Independent	11,279	1.27		
Auguste Boukanga	Union for Renewal and Democracy	7,085	0.80		
Olivier Gabirault	Alliance for Democracy and Progress	5,834	0.66		
Total		889,594	100.00	945,619	100.00
Valid votes		889,594	93.98	945,619	96.72
Invalid/blank votes		57,022	6.02	32,111	3.28
Total votes		946,616	100.00	977,730	100.00
Registered voters/turnout		1,302,930	72.65	1,452,211	67.33
Source: African Elections Database

=== National Assembly ===
Party	Seats	+/–
National Convergence "Kwa Na Kwa" independents	16	New
Movement for the Liberation of the Central African People	11	New
Party for Democracy in Central Africa (KNK)	8	+1
National Party for a New Central Africa (KNK)	7	New
Central African Democratic Rally	7	New
Social Democratic Party	5	–6
Liberal Democratic Party (KNK)	3	New
National Unity Party	3	New
Movement for Democracy, Independence and Social Progress	3	New
Action Party for Development (KNK)	2	–36
National Union for Democracy and Rally (KNK)	2	–1
Movement for Democracy and Development (KNK)	2	0
Patriotic Front for Progress	2	New
Alliance for Democracy and Progress	2	–13
Movement for Unity, Peace and Security (KNK)	1	–5
National Democratic Front (KNK)	1	–3
Democratic Forum for Modernity	1	–1
Löndö Association	1	New
PSD–CSDC	1	New
Independents	27	New
Total	105	–4
Source: EISA
