= Movement for Democracy, Independence and Social Progress =

Political party in the Central African Republic

The Movement for Democracy, Independence and Social Progress (French: Mouvement pour la Démocratie l'Indépendance et le Progrès Social, MDI-PS) is a political party in the Central African Republic.

== History ==
The MDI-PS was established in 1991 as a non-sectarian party. The party joined the opposition Consultation of Opposition Political Parties alliance for the 2005 general elections. The alliance won 11 seats, of which the MDI-PS won three.

In 2010 the party joined the Presidential Majority alliance in preparation for the 2011 general elections. The MDI-PS nominated 14 candidates for the 105 seats in the National Assembly, winning one of the alliance's 11 seats.
