= Enoch Derant Lakoué =

Central African politician

Prime Minister of the Central African Republic
- In office 26 February 1993 – 25 October 1993
- President: André Kolingba; Ange-Félix Patassé
- Preceded by: Timothée Malendoma
- Succeeded by: Jean-Luc Mandaba

Personal details
- Born: October 5, 1944 (age 81) Fort Lamy, French Equatorial Africa (now N'Djamena, Chad)
- Party: PSD

Enoch Derant Lakoué (born 5 October 1944) is a Central African politician who was Prime Minister of the Central African Republic from 26 February 1993 to 25 October 1993.

== Early life ==
Lakoué was born on 5 October 1944 in Fort Lamy (now N'Djamena), Chad. He is a member of the Gbaya ethnic group. From 1960 to 1962 he studied at the Lycée Emile-Gentil in Bangui and subsequently studied economics.

== Political career ==
He was appointed deputy director of trade and industry on 16 February 1968, and was promoted to director of industry on 1 February 1969. President Jean-Bedel Bokassa named Lakoué minister of transportation on 25 June 1970. He was named industries minister on 19 August and trade minister on 25 November. Lakoué was appointed minister of finance, industry, and trade on 29 December 1971, serving in this role until 27 October 1972. Afterwards he served as director general of the Banque de developpement des etats de l'Afrique centrale (BDEAC) until 1982. He also worked for the World Bank, the United Nations Development Program, and UNESCO.

Lakoué was briefly a member of the Movement for the Liberation of the Central African People, led by Ange-Félix Patassé. Lakoué was the candidate of the Social Democratic Party in the August 1993 presidential election, receiving 2.39% of the vote. He was appointed prime minister in February 1993, but resigned in October after failing to bring major opposition parties into the government. Cyriaque Samba-Panza served as his chief of staff during his brief tenure as prime minister.

Lakoué ran for president again in the September 1999 presidential election, receiving 1.33% of the vote. After the 1999 election, he refused to sign a declaration signed by the other opposition candidates that denounced the election due to irregularities, rejected the results in advance, and called for popular resistance; Lakoué said that he was "not in favor of disorder" and that his opposition to the government was moderate.

He was appointed director of the Bank of Central African States in 2003. He initially declared his candidacy in the 2005 presidential election, but withdrew it prior to the Constitutional Court's 30 December 2004 ruling on the validity of candidacies, choosing to remain in his position as head of the national administration of the Bank of Central African States. Following a rebellion in December 2012, a national unity government was appointed on 3 February 2013, composed of supporters of President François Bozizé, the opposition, and rebels. Lakoué was appointed to the government as Minister of State for the Economy, Planning, and Cooperation. He signed a national reconciliation agreement spearheaded by the Catholic Church on 27 February 2015.

== Awards ==
- Central African Order of Industrial and Crafts Merit (1972)

== Notes ==
Preceded by Timothée Malendoma	Prime Minister of the Central African Republic; 1993	Succeeded by Jean-Luc Mandaba
