= National Convergence "Kwa Na Kwa" =

Political party in the Central African Republic

National Convergence "Kwa Na Kwa" Convergence nationale "Kwa Na Kwa"
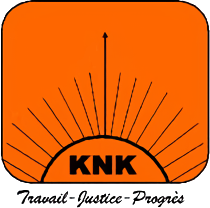
- Leader: François Bozizé; Elie Ouefio (interim)
- Founded: 21 August 2004 (as a coalition); 21 August 2009 (as a party)
- Merger of: PNCN; PAD; MDD; UNADER; PLD; FND; PDCA; MDI-PS
- Ideology: Social democracy (de jure)
- Political position: See below
- Colors: Orange
- Seats in the National Assembly (April 6th, 2016): 7 / 100

The National Convergence "Kwa Na Kwa" (French: Convergence nationale "Kwa Na Kwa"), popularly known as simply Kwa Na Kwa or KNK (lit. 'Work, only Work' in Sango), is a political party in the Central African Republic, built around support of François Bozizé. The party was originally an alliance of several political parties, before some merged into a single party in August 2009.

== History ==
After his seizure of power in a March 2003 coup, Bozizé pledged he would not run in future elections. On 21 August 2004, an alliance of small political parties, business and political leaders launched the National Convergence "Kwa Na Kwa" as a political coalition to urge Bozizé to stand for president. Parties joining the KNK coalition included the National Party for a New Central Africa (PNCN), the Action Party for Development (PAD), the Movement for Democracy and Development (MDD), the National Union for Democracy and Rally (UNADER), the Liberal Democratic Party (PLD), the National Democratic Front (FND), the Party for Democracy in Central Africa (PDCA) and the Movement for Democracy, Independence and Social Progress (MDI-PS).

Following the December constitutional referendum and a subsequent decree calling for general elections on 30 January 2005, Bozizé announced he would run for president as an independent, supported by the KNK coalition. At a rally in Bangui, called by the KNK, Bozizé announced that he would "contest the election to achieve the task of rebuilding the country, which is dear to me and according to your wish." The elections were eventually delayed until May, and saw Bozizé win the presidential election with 64.6% of the vote in the second round, whilst the KNK won 42 of the 105 seats in the National Assembly.

In 2009, some member parties of the KNK alliance merged into a single party, although several did not, including the PNCN, PAD, FND, MDD, PLD, PDCA, UNADER and the MDI-PS. In the 2011 general elections, Bozizé was re-elected President with 64.4% of the vote in the first round, whilst the KNK won 61 of the 100 seats in the National Assembly.

== Ideology ==
The party was founded based on support for President Bozizé. Bozizé himself has described the KNK as a social democratic labourist party without "theories."

The Kwa Na Kwa is a working person's party in the tradition of social democracy. Its objective is to mobilize the population, raise awareness, and move towards development, in the sense of the fight against poverty: through work. It is only through work that we can change the situation we face in this country. The Kwa na Kwa is a tool to combat idleness, laziness and laxity. It is a party different from others in the sense that this is not a party of theories.

The party aligns itself with the founder of the Central African Republic, Barthélemy Boganda, and appeals to his "Five Verbs": "House, Feed, Educate, Heal, Clothe."

Africa Elects, an affiliate of Europe Elects, disputes the party's self-described ideology. It states that, by Bozizé's own statements describing the party, it holds an individualist view on poverty mainly focusing on personal responsibility, a view generally held by right-leaning or fully right-wing parties. It has also been described as holding Gbaya nationalist views, with Bozizé giving preference to Gbaya in positions of power. Bozizé himself (a Christian) has been accused of persecuting Muslim communities and driving them out of the western part of the country. Aside from this, the party has made repatriation of exiled former soldiers from the civil war one of its main policy points.
