= Jean Willybiro-Sako =

Central African Republic politician

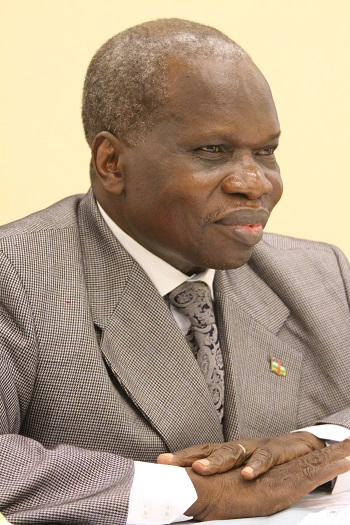
Jean Willybiro-Sako

Jean Willybiro-Sako (born May 11, 1946) is a politician in the Central African Republic. He was the Minister of State for Higher Education and Scientific Research from April 2011 to January 2013.
