= Central African Democratic Rally =

Political party in the Central African Republic

Central African Democratic Rally Rassemblement démocratique centrafricain
- Founder: André Kolingba
- Founded: 6 February 1987 (38 years, 335 days)
- Headquarters: Bangui
- Ideology: African nationalism Democratic socialism Social democracy Republicanism
- Political position: Centre-left to left-wing
- Colors: Yellow
- Seats in the National Assembly: 4 / 100

Website
- http://le-rdc.over-blog.com/

The Central African Democratic Rally (French: Rassemblement démocratique centrafricain, RDC) is a political party in the Central African Republic.

== History ==
The party was established on 6 February 1987, initially as the political vehicle for President André Kolingba. It was the only legal party in the country until 1992.

Kolingba was the party's presidential candidate in the 1993 general elections, and was eliminated in the first round after receiving just 12% of the vote. The party won 13 seats in the National Assembly, emerging as the second-largest faction behind the Movement for the Liberation of the Central African People (MLPC). It subsequently joined the coalition government led by the MLPC's Jean-Luc Mandaba.

In the next parliamentary elections in 1998 the RDC was part of the Union of Forces for Peace, (UFAP) which opposed President Ange-Félix Patassé. The RDC won 20 seats, and UFAP gained a majority of 55 of the 109 seats in the National Assembly. However, the MLPC was able to form a government after the defection of a UFAP MP. Kolingba was the party's candidate for the 1999 presidential elections, finishing second with 19% of the vote as Patassé was elected in the first round of voting.

Kolingba was the party's presidential candidate again for the 2005 general elections. He finished in third place with took 16% of the vote. The elections also saw the party reduced to seven seats in the National Assembly.

In the 2011 general elections the party won just one seat in the National Assembly, whilst its presidential candidate Émile Gros Raymond Nakombo finished fourth in a field of five with 5% of the vote.

After the death of André Kolingba, the party was chaired by his son Désiré Kolingba, until his death in April 2021.
