= Supreme Court of the Central African Republic =

National supreme court

The Supreme Court of the Central African Republic (French: Cour suprême de la République centrafricaine) is the Central African Republic's Supreme court. It exercises original jurisdiction over serious matters in the country of which a lower court (or, a magistrate's court) does not have the proper authority to operate and/or act on.
