= 2004 Central African constitutional referendum =

- 5 December 2004

Results
Choice	Votes	%
Yes	811,739	91.37%
No	76,635	8.63%
Valid votes	888,374	100.00%
Invalid or blank votes	0	0.00%
Total votes	888,374	100.00%
Registered voters/turnout	1,130,400	78.59%

A constitutional referendum was held in the Central African Republic on 5 December 2004. The new constitution would change the system of government from presidential to semi-presidential, as well as putting a limit of two terms on the President. It was approved by 91.37% of voters with a 77.1% turnout.

== Results ==
Choice	Votes	%
For	811,739	91.37
Against	76,635	8.63
Invalid/blank votes		–
Total	888,374	100
Registered voters/turnout	1,130,400	
Source: Direct Democracy
