= 1998 Central African parliamentary election =

Parliamentary elections were held in the Central African Republic on 22 November 1998, with a second round in 71 of the 109 constituencies on 13 December. Although the Movement for the Liberation of the Central African People won the most seats, all other parties with the exception of the Liberal Democratic Party and five of the independents formed an alliance known as the Union of Forces for Peace and Development (UFAP). In constituencies where there was a second round, parties in the alliance supported the leading candidate from their bloc. As a result, the UFAP won a total of 55 seats, giving it a majority in the National Assembly.

== Results ==
| Party | Seats | +/– |
|---|---|---|
| Movement for the Liberation of the Central African People | 47 | +13 |
| Central African Democratic Rally | 20 | +7 |
| Movement for Democracy and Development | 8 | +2 |
| Patriotic Front for Progress | 7 | 0 |
| Social Democratic Party | 6 | +3 |
| Alliance for Democracy and Progress | 5 | –1 |
| National Unity Party | 3 | New |
| Democratic Forum for Modernity | 2 | New |
| Liberal Democratic Party | 2 | –5 |
| Civic Forum | 1 | 0 |
| People's Union for the Republic | 1 | New |
| Independents | 7 | +5 |
| Total | 109 | +24 |
Source: EISA
