= Jean-Luc Mandaba =

Central African politician

Prime Minister of Central African Republic
- In office 25 October 1993 – 12 April 1995
- President: Ange-Félix Patassé
- Preceded by: Enoch Derant Lakoué
- Succeeded by: Gabriel Koyambounou

Personal details
- Born: 15 August 1943; Bangui, Ubangi-Shari
- Died: 22 October 2000 (aged 57); Bangui, Central African Republic
- Political party: MLPC
- Children: Hervé Mandaba

Jean-Luc Mandaba (15 August 1943 – 22 October 2000) was Prime Minister of the Central African Republic from 25 October 1993 to 12 April 1995 under President Ange-Félix Patassé.

== Biography ==
Mandaba was born on 15 August 1943 in Bangui. He received his primary education in Bangui. After his primary school certificate, he attended the St Marcel Sibut school and studied at Fort Archambault (Chad) and College Emile Gentil in Bangui. He studied nursing in Brazzaville and received a diploma in 1963. He joined the civil service as a sanitary hygiene inspector in 1965. Mandaba served in the military in Brazzaville from 1965 to 1966 before continuing his medical studies at the Joint faculty of Medicine and Pharmacy of Nantes and Rennes Medical school in France where he obtained the degree of Doctor of Medicine in 1972. He then specialized in surgery and obtained a general surgery degree from the University of Paris VI in 1976.

He returned to the Central African Republic and established a pediatric service at the National Hospital in Bangui. He won acclaim as a surgeon and was appointed Minister of Health in 1980, serving until 1981. He became Professor of Pediatric Surgery in 1983. In 1986, he became head of the department of obstetrics and gynecology at the University Hospital. Mandaba was also involved in several important sports positions.

Mandaba served as vice president of the MPLC before becoming prime minister. On 25 October 1993, shortly after Ange-Félix Patassé became president, he appointed Mandaba to the position of prime minister. He was forced to resign as prime minister in April 1995 to preempt a threatened vote of no-confidence in the government following accusations of corruption and incompetence. Gabriel Koyambounou replaced him as prime minister. From 1995 to his death he was Chairman of the Board of the Central African Sugar Management Company (SOGESCA). After the second army mutiny of 1996, he and Jean Serge Ouafio set up the 'Karako' militia forces, which Patassé then brought into the military to balance the predominance of southern Yakoma in the armed forces inherited from the Kolingba era.

After attending a dinner to celebrate the first anniversary of Patassé's second term on 21 October 2000, Mandaba suddenly felt sick and died at home of a heart attack. He performed a final surgery hours before he died. His 31-year-old son Hervé died under similar circumstances a few weeks later. This led to accusations from Mandaba's family and from the youth movement Flambeau centrafricain (FLAC) that Patassé had them poisoned because they were suspected of planning a coup.

== Notes ==
Preceded by Enoch Derant Lakoué	Prime Minister of the Central African Republic; 1993–1995	Succeeded by Gabriel Koyambounou
