= André Kolingba =

Central African politician

André-Dieudonné Kolingba
- Kolingba in 1990

4th President of the Central African Republic
- In office 1 September 1981 – 22 October 1993
- Prime Minister: Vacant (1981–1991); Édouard Frank; Timothée Malendoma; Enoch Derant Lakoué
- Preceded by: David Dacko
- Succeeded by: Ange-Félix Patassé

Personal details
- Born: 12 August 1936 Bangui, Ubangi-Shari
- Died: 7 February 2010 (aged 73) Paris, France
- Party: RDC
- Spouse: Mireille Kotalimbora-Kolingba (m. 1969)
- Children: Désiré Kolingba
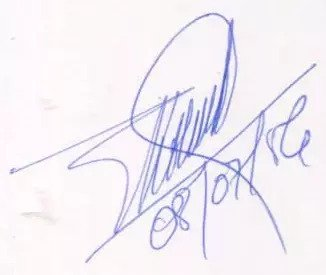
- Signature

André-Dieudonné Kolingba (12 August 1936 – 7 February 2010) was a Central African politician, who was the fourth President of the Central African Republic (CAR), from 1 September 1981 until 22 October 1993. He took power from President David Dacko in a bloodless coup d'état in 1981 and lost power to Ange-Félix Patassé in a democratic election held in 1993. Kolingba retained the strong support of France until the end of the Cold War in 1992, after which both internal and external pressure forced him to hold presidential elections which he lost.

His twelve-year term in office saw the growing influence of the International Monetary Fund (IMF) and World Bank in decisions by donor-nations regarding financial support and management of the Central African state. Many members of Kolingba's ethnic group, the Yakoma people, obtained lucrative posts in the public, private and parastatal sectors of the CAR's economy during his era. This gave rise to growing tension between so-called "southerners" (including the riverine Yakoma) and "northerners" (including the savanna Gbaya) in the CAR which led to violent confrontations between these groups during the Patassé era (1993–2003).

In 2001, Kolingba took part in a failed coup attempt against Patassé, after which he temporarily fled to Uganda to evade trial.

== Biography ==
=== Early life and education ===
André-Dieudonné Kolingba was born on 12 August 1936 in Bangui, the capital of the French colony of Oubangui-Chari in French Equatorial Africa. A member of the riverine Yakoma ethnic group, Kolingba (meaning "male Buffalo") joined the French military in 1954 and received military training at the École de formation des officiers ressortissants des territoires d'outre-mer (EFORTOM) at Fréjus. He was transferred to the Central African army at independence in 1960. As a military officer, he also worked at Radio Bangui, where he became a host at the magazine of the Central African Armed Forces and a classical music program and later was promoted to co-director. While working at the radio, he met his future wife, Mireille Kotalimbora.

He became a sub-lieutenant on 1 October 1964, a colonel, and then a brigadier general on 3 April 1973. As a battalion commander, he was named technical adviser to the minister of national defense, veterans and war victims on 1 March 1977, as well as aide-de-camp of Bokassa. He then served briefly as the CAR's ambassador to Canada — replacing Sylvestre Bangui — and the Federal Republic of Germany before being named minister in March 1979. When Bokassa was overthrown in 1979 and David Dacko was restored to power by the French, Kolingba gained Dacko's favor and was made army chief of staff in July 1981.

=== Overthrow of David Dacko ===
In September 1981, Kolingba overthrew Dacko in a coup d'état. There has been considerable speculation about who supported Kolingba's seizure of power. It has been suggested that local French military advisers helped him carry out the coup without the authorization or knowledge of Socialist President François Mitterrand and his entourage (Delayan 1985; Kalck 2004). Central African Republic specialists Richard Bradshaw and Carlos Fandos-Rius also state that Kolingba "seized power with French support". According to historian Brian Titley, the 800 French soldiers in the country had orders not to interfere. In 1991, DGSE head Pierre Marion admitted that the French military advisor Jean-Claude Mantion had played a role in the coup.

The French went on to support Kolingba until the fall of the Berlin Wall and the democratization movement in Africa during the late 1980s and early 1990s led to local, French and international pressure to hold presidential elections.

=== Ruling years ===
After overthrowing Dacko in 1981, Kolingba established a military committee for national reconstruction to rule the country, but in fact he ruled as a military dictator, more corrupt than brutal, until 1986, when he submitted a Constitution to a national referendum. The document was approved with an implausible total of 92 percent. Under its terms, Kolingba was automatically elected president for a six-year term. It also established the Central African Democratic Rally (Rassemblement Démocratique Centrafricain, RDC) as the country's only legal party. Parliamentary elections were held in 1987, in which voters were presented with a single list of RDC candidates. With all candidates effectively handpicked by Kolingba, he effectively held complete political control over the country. His regime kept political opponents, for example Abel Goumba, under close surveillance and excluded them from formal politics.

Kolingba's government favored fellow Yakoma to hold important administrative, financial and military posts. This led to the majority of key positions being taken up by Yakoma people. Although disproportionate Yakoma influence already dated back to the colonial era when they worked for Europeans and had access to French education, Amnesty International has stated that "nepotism became institutionalized" under Kolingba. His years in office further saw the return of Jean-Bédel Bokassa to the Central African Republic. After the latter was tried and sentenced to death in 1987, Kolingba decided to commute this to a life sentence in 1988.

With regards to international politics, the country's existing ties with France were maintained or even strengthened. Jean-Claude Mantion, the SDECE and DGSE officer who was implied in the 1981 coup by Marion, had been installed at the head of the Presidential Guard under Dacko shortly before the coup took place. Mantion maintained this position throughout the entirety of the Kolingba era. This led him to be described as a "proconsul" and as "the president of President Kolingba", implying he was even more powerful than Kolingba himself.

The repression of opposition under the Kolingba regime backfired: by 1990, the opposition had united in an alliance, the Comité de coordination pour la convocation d’une conférence nationale (CCCCN). Internal and external pressures gradually forced Kolingba to open up the regime. In March 1991 he agreed to share power with Edouard Frank, who he named prime minister. He also established a commission to make the constitution more democratic and pluralistic. In late 1991, the donor community (most notably a very vocal US ambassador and elements in the French government) finally pressured Kolingba to hold free elections. These took place in 1992, assisted by the UN Electoral Assistance Unit and monitored by international observers. Kolingba finished last, with only 10 percent of the vote. In response, he had the constitutional council declare the election invalid.

Kolingba's presidential mandate was due to expire on 28 November 1992, but he carried out a "constitutional coup d'état" which extended his presidential term for another 90 days. At multiple occasions throughout 1992, the government took violent action against protesters and carried out extrajudicial executions. These included the beating to death of ADP politician Jean-Claude Conjugo and the killing of a pregnant woman (Hermine Yakite) on her way to hospital to give birth after she resisted attempts to commandeer her car.

=== Election of Patassé ===
On 3 February 1993, Kolingba established an interim organ, the National Provisional Political Council of the Republic (Conseil National Politique Provisoire de la République). On 28 February 1993, Goumba, by now leader of the opposition Democratic Forces for Dialogue (Concertation des Forces Démocratiques), announced President Kolingba was no longer president. Unwilling to give in, Kolingba remained in his post but the group of local donor representatives (GIBAFOR), notably from the USA and France, forced him to hold proper elections. The same team which the UN Electoral Assistance unit had provided for the earlier election, and which Kolingba's government caused to fail, was brought in to give its support. Kolingba came in fourth, with only 12 percent of the vote - well short of a spot in the runoff. Ange Patassé won the presidency in the second round on 19 September 1993. When Kolingba turned over the presidency to Patassé a month later, it marked the first (and to date only) time since independence when an incumbent president peacefully surrendered power to the opposition.

=== Involvement in 2001 coup attempt ===
On the night of 27–28 May 2001, a coup attempt against President Patassé took place, but failed. Two days later, Kolingba claimed responsibility for the attempted coup through Radio France Internationale and demanded that Patassé "resign and hand over power to him". Patassé reacted by demoting Kolingba and four other officers to the rank of private. On June 1, Kolingba called on the other coup plotters to lay down arms and attempted to negotiate with Patassé, which the latter refused. Shortly afterwards, weapons were found in Kolingba's residence.

Kolingba fled to Kampala, Uganda, to evade trial. He was found guilty in absentia by the Central African criminal court and sentenced to death. 21 of Kolingba's associates, including 3 of his sons, also received a death sentence.

=== Final years and death ===
Patassé was overthrown in a March 2003 coup by François Bozizé, who declared an amnesty for all those involved in the 2001 coup attempt. Kolingba finally returned to Bangui on 5 October 2003 during the last days of a National Conference (Dialogue National) which Bozizé sponsored to promote reconciliation and reconstruction of the country. On 7 October 2003, Kolingba attended the conference and spoke to the delegates, publicly apologizing for the excesses committed during his rule as well as his role in the 2001 coup attempt. He then left for Paris on 2 November 2003 for a prostate operation. Kolingba died there on 7 February 2010.

== Awards and family ==
Kolingba married Mireille Kotalimbora-Kolingba in 1969, and the couple had twelve children.

Kolingba was named officier de l'Ordre de l'Opération Bokassa (Officer of the Order of the Operation Bokassa) on 1 December 1971, officier de l'Ordre de la Médaille de la Reconnaissance Centrafricaine (Officer of the Order of the Medal of Central African Gratitude) on 1 January 1972, chevalier de l'Ordre du Merite Postal (Knight of the Order of Postal Merit) on 1 December 1972, commandeur (Commander) (1 January 1975) and dignité de Grand-Croix (Grand Cross) (1 December 1981) de l'Ordre du Mérite Centrafricain (Central African Order of Merit).

== Sources ==
- Kalck, Pierre (2004). Historical Dictionary of the Central African Republic. Metuchen, & London: The Scarecrow Press.
- Delayen, Julie Anne. "Origins and Causes of Military Rule in the Central African Republic." M.A. thesis, University of Florida, 1985.
- Titley, Brian (1997). Dark Age: The Political Odyssey of Emperor Bokassa. London & Montreal: McGill-Queen's University Press.
- Saulnier, Pierre (1998). Le Centrafrique: Entre mythe et réalité. Paris: L'Harmattan.

Political offices
Preceded by David Dacko	President of Central African Republic; 1981–1993	Succeeded by Ange-Félix Patassé
