= Movement for the Liberation of the Central African People =

Political party in the Central African Republic

Movement for the Liberation of the Central African People Mouvement pour la libération du peuple centrafricain
- President: Martin Ziguélé
- Founder: Ange-Félix Patassé
- Founded: 28 March 1978 (48 years, 189 days)
- Headquarters: Bangui
- Ideology: Democratic socialism Social democracy Republicanism; African socialism Pan-Africanism; Left-wing nationalism
- Political position: Left-wing
- International affiliation: Progressive Alliance
- Colors: Green
- National Assembly: 0 / 140

The Movement for the Liberation of the Central African People (French: Mouvement pour la libération du peuple centrafricain, MLPC) is a political party in the Central African Republic. It is a member of the Progressive Alliance.

== History ==
The party was established on 28 March 1978 in Paris by former Prime Minister Ange-Félix Patassé as a Central African opposition movement. It called for the replacement of President David Dacko by a national council authorised to establish a 'provisional government of national unity'.

After multi-party politics was reintroduced in the early 1990s, the party won the 1993 general elections. Patassé was elected President, defeating Abel Goumba in the second round of the presidential elections by a margin of 53–46%. In the parliamentary elections, the MLPC won 34 of the 85 seats in the National Assembly, becoming the largest party. In the 1998 parliamentary elections, the party won 47 of the 109 seats. However, the Union of Forces for Peace (UFAP) alliance, which opposed Patassé, obtained a parliamentary majority, with its members winning a combined 55 seats. Nevertheless, the MLPC was able to form a government after the defection of a UFAP MP. Patassé won the 1999 presidential elections in the first round with 51% of the vote, but was removed from office by a coup in 2003.

General elections were held again in 2005, with coup leader François Bozizé beating the MLPC candidate Martin Ziguélé in the second round of the presidential elections. Patassé, who was in exile at the time, had initially been the MLPC candidate, but was barred from contesting the election due to charges against him regarding alleged wrongdoing while in office. Although the MLPC emerged as the largest single party in the National Assembly, it won only 11 seats, whilst the pro-Bozizé National Convergence "Kwa Na Kwa" alliance held a combined 42 seats.

Ziguélé was elected as President of the MLPC at an extraordinary party congress in late June 2006, while Patassé was suspended from the party for a year. This was on a provisional basis for one year, until Ziguélé was elected to a three-year term as President at the MLPC's third ordinary congress, held from 21–23 June 2007. At the congress, Patassé's suspension was extended until the next ordinary congress, and several individuals were excluded from the party, including former National Assembly President Luc Apollinaire Dondon Konamambaye.

In the 2011 general elections, the party nominated Ziguélé as its presidential candidate for a second time. However, he finished third in a field of five candidates with just 7% of the vote. In the parliamentary elections, the MLPC was reduced to a single seat in the National Assembly.
