= Ange-Félix Patassé =

Central African politician (1937–2011)

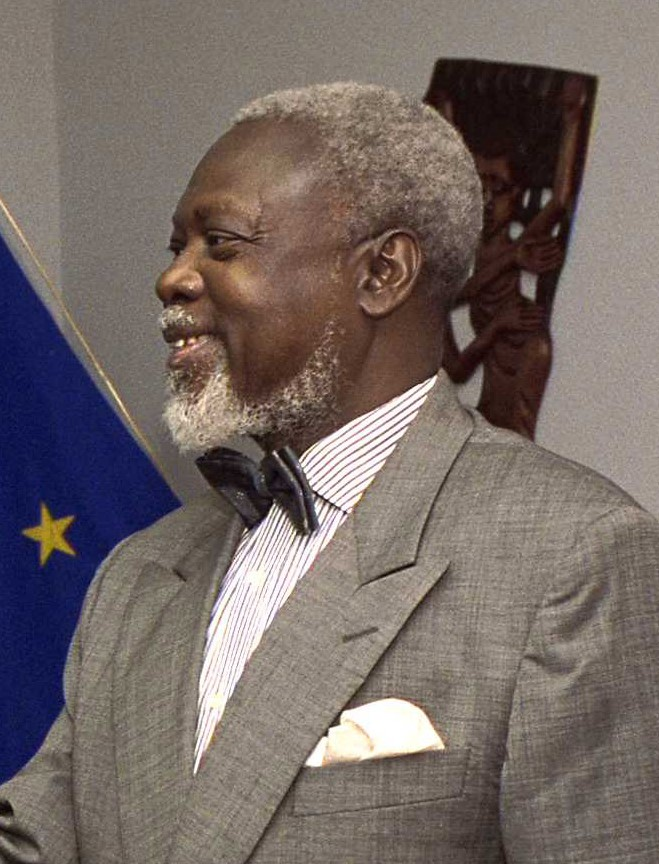
- Patassé in 2001

5th President of the Central African Republic
- In office 22 October 1993 – 15 March 2003
- Prime Minister: Enoch Derant Lakoué; Jean-Luc Mandaba; Gabriel Koyambounou; Jean-Paul Ngoupandé; Michel Gbezera-Bria; Anicet-Georges Dologuélé; Martin Ziguélé
- Preceded by: André Kolingba
- Succeeded by: François Bozizé

Prime Minister of the Central African Empire
- In office 8 December 1976 – 14 July 1978
- Monarch: Bokassa I
- Preceded by: Elisabeth Domitien
- Succeeded by: Henri Maïdou

Personal details
- Born: 25 January 1937 Paoua, Lim-Pendé, Ubangi-Shari (now Central African Republic)
- Died: 5 April 2011 (aged 74) Douala, Cameroon
- Party: Movement for the Liberation of the Central African People (MPLC); Movement for the Social Evolution of Black Africa (MESAN)
- Spouse(s): Lucienne Lemotomo Patassé (separated); Angèle Patassé (died 2007)
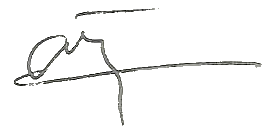
- Signature

Ange-Félix Patassé (25 January 1937 – 5 April 2011) was a Central African politician who was president of the Central African Republic from 1993 until 2003, when he was deposed by the rebel leader François Bozizé in the 2003 coup d'état. Patassé was the first president in the CAR's history (since 1960) to be chosen in what was generally regarded as a fairly democratic election (1993), in that it was brought about by donor pressure on President André Kolingba and assisted by the United Nations Electoral Assistance Unit.

He was chosen a second time in a fair election (1999) as well. However, during his first term in office (1993–1999), three military mutinies in 1996–1997 led to increasing conflict between so-called "northerners" (like Patassé) and "southerners" (like his predecessor President André Kolingba). Expatriate mediators and peacekeeping troops were brought in to negotiate peace accords between Patassé and the mutineers and to maintain law and order. During his second term as president, Patassé increasingly lost the support of a number of his long-time allies as well as the French, who had intervened to support him during his first term in office. Patassé was ousted in March 2003 and went into exile in Togo.

== Background ==
Patassé was born in Paoua, the capital of the northwestern province of Ouham Pendé in the colony of Ubangi-Shari in French Equatorial Africa, and he belonged to the Sara-Kaba ethnic group which predominates in the region around Paoua. Patassé's father, Paul Ngakoutou, who had served in the Free French military forces during the Second World War and afterwards worked for the colonial administration in the Province of Ouham-Pendé, was a member of the Sara-kaba people and was raised in a small village to the northeast of Boguila. Patassé's mother, Véronique Goumba, belonged to the Kare ethnic group of northwestern Ubangi-Shari. As Patassé spent much of his youth in Paoua he was associated with the Ouham-Pendé province and a number of his most loyal political supporters were ethnic Kaba. After attending school in Ubangi-Shari, Patassé studied in an agricultural institute in Puy-de-Dôme, France, where he received a Technical Baccalaureate which allowed him to enroll in the Superior Academy of Tropical Agriculture in Nogent-sur-Marne, and then in the National Agronomical Institute in Paris. Specializing in zootechnology, he received a diploma from the Center for the Artificial Insemination of Domestic Animals in Rambouillet, France. He finished his studies in Paris in 1959, a year before the independence of the Central African Republic.

== Political career ==
=== 1960s–1970s: Rise to power ===
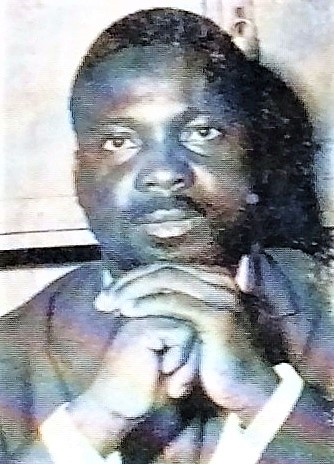
Patassé in 1960

Patassé joined the Central African civil service in 1959, shortly before independence. He became an agricultural engineer and agricultural inspector in the Ministry of Agriculture in July 1963, under President David Dacko. In December 1965, Dacko appointed him Director of Agriculture and Minister of Development. In 1966, Jean-Bédel Bokassa took power in a coup d'état. Patassé was the "cousin" of President Bokassa's principal wife, Catherine Denguiadé, and gained the confidence of the new president, serving in almost all the governments formed by Bokassa. After Bokassa's creation of the Council for the Central African Revolution (in imitation of the Libyan Revolutionary Command Council), Patassé was named a member of the Council of the Revolution with the rank of Prime Minister in charge of Posts and Communications, Tourism, Water, Forests, Hunting and Fishing, as well as Custodian of the Seats of State (4 September 1976 – 14 December 1976). During this period Patassé followed Bokassa in becoming a convert to Islam for a few months, and changed his name to Mustafa Patassé. After Bokassa became Emperor Bokassa I, Patassé was named Prime Minister and Head of the first Imperial Government. He remained in this position for 2 1/2 years, when a public announcement was made that Patassé had stepped down from office due to health problems. Patassé then left for France, where he remained in exile until the overthrow of Bokassa in September 1979. Shortly before Bokassa's overthrow, Patassé announced his opposition to the Emperor and founded the Front de Libération du Peuple Centrafricain (FLPC; Front for the Liberation of the Central African People).

Emperor Bokassa was overthrown and President David Dacko restored to power by the French in 1979. Dacko ordered Patassé to be put under house arrest. Patassé attempted to escape to Chad, but failed and was arrested again. He was later released due to alleged health problems.

=== Patassé government (1976–1978) ===
The Patassé government was the first government of the Central African Empire, created immediately after Bokassa crowned himself Emperor. Patassé worked under strict imperial control, with Bokassa holding real power. His government was tasked with managing the transition from republic to empire, implementing imperial reforms, and preparing for the extravagant coronation of 1977. Growing internal tensions and Bokassa’s suspicions led to Patassé’s dismissal in July 1978, after which Henri Maïdou replaced him as Prime Minister. Which dismissed the cabinet. The cabinet was succeeded by the Henri Maïdou Cabinet.

==== Cabinet ====
- Ange-Félix Patassé — Prime Minister
- Jean-Bédel Bokassa Jr. — Minister of Defense (nominal, symbolic role for the heir)
- André Zama — Acting Minister of Defense / Military Affairs (real operational authority)
- François Gueret — Minister of Justice
- Michel Adama Tamboux — Minister of Foreign Affairs
- Charles Bodinga — Minister of Health
- Élie Doté — Minister of National Education
- Albert Bébembélé — Minister of Finance
- Nicolas Mandaba — Minister of Agriculture
- Jean-Pierre Lebanga — Minister of Public Works
- Prosper Danionga — Minister of Information
- Simon Ngango — Minister of Interior

=== 1980s: Return to politics and further exile ===
Patassé returned to the CAR to present himself as a candidate for the presidential election of 15 March 1981, after which it was announced that Patassé gained 38% of the votes and thus came in second, after President Dacko. Patassé denounced the election results as rigged. Several months later, on 1 September 1981, General André Kolingba overthrew Dacko in a bloodless coup and took power, after which he forbade political activity in the country. Patassé felt obliged to leave the Central African Republic to live in exile once again, but on 27 February 1982, Patassé returned to the Central African Republic and participated in an unsuccessful coup d'état attempt against General Kolingba with the help of a few military officers such as General François Bozizé. Four days later, having failed to gain the support of the military forces, Patassé went in disguise to the French Embassy to seek refuge. After heated negotiations between President Kolingba and the French, Patassé was allowed to leave for exile in Togo. After remaining abroad for almost a decade, of which several years were spent in France, Patassé returned to the Central African Republic in 1992 to participate in presidential elections as head of the Movement for the Liberation of the Central African People (MLPC). The donor community, with the fall of the Soviet Union, saw no need to prop up the Kolingba regime and so had pressed for change helping to organize elections with some help from the UN Electoral Assistance Unit and with logistical support from the French army.

=== First presidential term (1993–1999) ===
After the Kolingba regime sabotaged a first set of elections in 1992, a second set of elections was held. On the second round on 19 September 1993, Patassé came in first with 37 percent of the vote, well ahead of his nearest competitors, Kolingba, David Dacko and Abel Goumba. He defeated Goumba in the runoff. Largely thanks to the foreign pressure notably from the US and technical support from the UN, for the first time the elections were fair and democratic. Patassé thus became the first president in the nation's history to gain power by such means. When he took office on 22 October 1993; it marked the first (and to date, only) time in the country's history that a sitting government peacefully surrendered power to the opposition. During Patassé's first six-year term in office (22 October 1993 – 1999), the economy appeared to improve a little as the flow of donor money started up again following the elections and the apparent legitimacy they brought.

Patassé had the support of most of his own Sara-Kaba people, the largest ethno-linguistic group in the Central African Republic, as well as the Souma people of his "hometown" of Paoua and the Kare people of his mother. Most of his supporters lived in the most populous northwestern savanna regions of the CAR, and thus came to be called "northerners", whereas all previous presidents were from either the forest or Ubangi River regions in the south, and so their supporters came to be called "southerners". As a populist, Patassé promoted himself as a candidate who represented a majority of the population against the privileges of southerners who held a disproportionate number of lucrative jobs in the public and parastatal sectors of the economy. Most notably, the Yakoma people had already obtained access to European education in the colonial era and were systematically favored under the presidency of Kolingba. As President, Patassé lowered the pay of the Yakoma-dominated army corps (which he distrusted), and conversely created a well-paid presidential guard and other militias mainly composed of "northerners".

This reversal of a long-standing ethnic inequality heightened tensions in the country and quickly pitted officers and soldiers against Patassé. This led to three consecutive mutinies by badly-paid soldiers in 1996–1997. Destruction of buildings and property during these rebellions had an adverse impact on the economy. The first mutiny began in May 1996. Patassé's government successfully regained control with the help of François Bozizé and the French, but his obvious dependency on the French, against whom he had regularly railed, reduced his standing further. His subsequent use of Libyan troops as a body guard did nothing to help his reputation, either locally or with the donor community and the US even closed their embassy temporarily. The last and most serious mutiny continued until early 1997, when a semblance of order was restored after the signing of the Bangui Agreements, and with the help of troops from Burkina Faso, Chad, Gabon, Mali, Senegal, and Togo. The Security Council of the United Nations approved a mission for peace, MINURCA, in 1998. MINURCA was made up of 1,350 African soldiers. These mutinies greatly increased the tension between "northerners" and "southerners" in the CAR and thus polarized society to a greater extent than before.

=== Second presidential term (1999–2003) and coup attempts ===
In the presidential election of September 1999, Patassé won easily, defeating former presidents Kolingba and Dacko. He won in the first round with about 51.6% of the vote. Opposition leaders accused the elections of being rigged. During his second term, Patassé became increasingly unpopular. In 2000, his former prime minister Jean-Luc Mandaba and his son Hervé both died within a short span of time, which led to accusations from Mandaba's family and the youth movement Flambeau centrafricain (FLAC) that Patassé had them poisoned because he suspected them of planning a coup. In May 2001, a failed coup attempt against Patassé took place, in which Kolingba and possibly Bozizé were involved. Both of these officers left the country to evade trial: Kolingba for Uganda, Bozizé for Chad along with military forces that were loyal to him.

In the aftermath of the 2001 coup attempt, the Yakoma were targeted by the Patassé government in reprisal attacks. Hundreds were extrajudicially executed and about 80.000 displaced. Several of these killings took place in broad daylight on the streets of Bangui. Over the course of the following two years, foreign fighters from Libya as well as Congolese rebels from the MLC (led by Jean-Pierre Bemba) were deployed in combat against Bozizé loyalists. The MLC was later found guilty by the International Criminal Court (ICC) of committing war crimes during this intervention, including murder, rape, pillaging and torture.

In October 2002, another coup attempt took place, this time carried out by Bozizé who had returned from Chad with his militias. After a week of fighting, the Patassé government, aided by the Libyans and MLC fighters, emerged victorious. The government was again criticized for widespread human rights abuses by its troops including sexual violence and the killing of dozens to a hundred Chadian nationals in Bangui; additionally, Patassé cracked down on the press.

=== 2003–2008: Ouster and criminal charges ===
Patassé left the country for a conference in Niger in 2003, and in his absence Bozizé seized Bangui on March 15. Although this takeover was internationally condemned, no attempt was made to depose the new leader. Patassé then went into exile in Togo.

Although nominated as the MLPC's presidential candidate in November 2004, on 30 December 2004 Patassé was barred from running in the 2005 presidential election due to what the Constitutional Court considered problems with his birth certificate and land title. He was one of seven candidates barred, while five, including Bozizé, were permitted to stand. After an agreement signed in Libreville, Gabon on 22 January 2005, all barred presidential candidates were permitted to stand in the March 13 election except for Patassé, on the grounds that he was the subject of judicial proceedings. The MLPC instead backed his last prime minister, Martin Ziguélé, for president.

Patassé was accused of stealing 70 billion Central African francs from the country's treasury. He denied this and in an interview with Agence France-Presse on 21 December 2004, he stated that he had no idea where he could have found so much money to steal in a country with a budget of only 90–100 billion francs. He was also accused of war crimes in connection with the violence that followed a failed 2002 coup attempt, in which rebels from the northern Democratic Republic of the Congo came to Patassé's assistance, but were accused of committing multiple atrocities in the process. Patassé, the Congolese rebel leader Jean-Pierre Bemba and three others were charged in September 2004. However, the government of the Central African Republic was unable to arrest them, so the courts referred the matter in April 2006 to the International Criminal Court.

=== 2008–2011: Return to Bangui, last presidential campaign, and death ===
On 7 December 2008, Patassé returned to the Central African Republic for the first time since his ouster in order to participate in a national dialogue, with the government's permission. Arriving at the airport in Bangui, he kissed the ground and said that he had "not come to judge but to find grounds for entente and to tackle the problems of the Central African Republic". At the dialogue, Patassé said that the political situation should be resolved not through removing Bozizé from office, but through "democratic, transparent and fair elections in 2010".

Patassé said in June 2009 that he would be leaving his Togolese exile and returning to Bangui in preparation for the 2010 presidential election, in which he planned to stand as a candidate. Although Ziguélé had taken over the MPLC, Patassé declared that he would convene a party congress upon his return. He eventually returned to Bangui on 30 October 2009, amidst a "discreet atmosphere". He subsequently met with Bozizé on November 9. Following the meeting, Patassé thanked Bozizé in a statement and said that they had discussed the Central African Republic's problems "in a brotherly atmosphere". He also reiterated his intention to stand as a presidential candidate in 2010.

Patassé placed second in the January 2011 presidential election, far behind Bozizé, although ill-health had impeded his campaigning. He suffered from diabetes and was prevented from leaving the country for treatment in Equatorial Guinea in March 2011. He was eventually allowed to travel, but was hospitalised at Douala in Cameroon en route to Malabo, and died there on 5 April 2011. There were calls for a state funeral.

== Personal life ==
Patassé's first wife was Lucienne Patassé, with whom he had seven children - four girls and three boys. Patassé separated from and divorced Lucienne during his first exile in Togo from 1982 to 1992. Lucienne, who was elected to the National Assembly in 1993, died on 29 July 2000, at the age of 56.

He then married a Togolese woman, Angèle Patassé, who became first lady during his presidency. The couple had three children and lived in exile at a villa in Lomé, Togo, beginning in 2003. Angèle died in Lomé on 3 December 2007 at the age of 52.
