= 2020–21 Central African general election =

- 27 December 2020 (first round); 14 March 2021 (second round)
- Presidential election
- Turnout: 35.25%
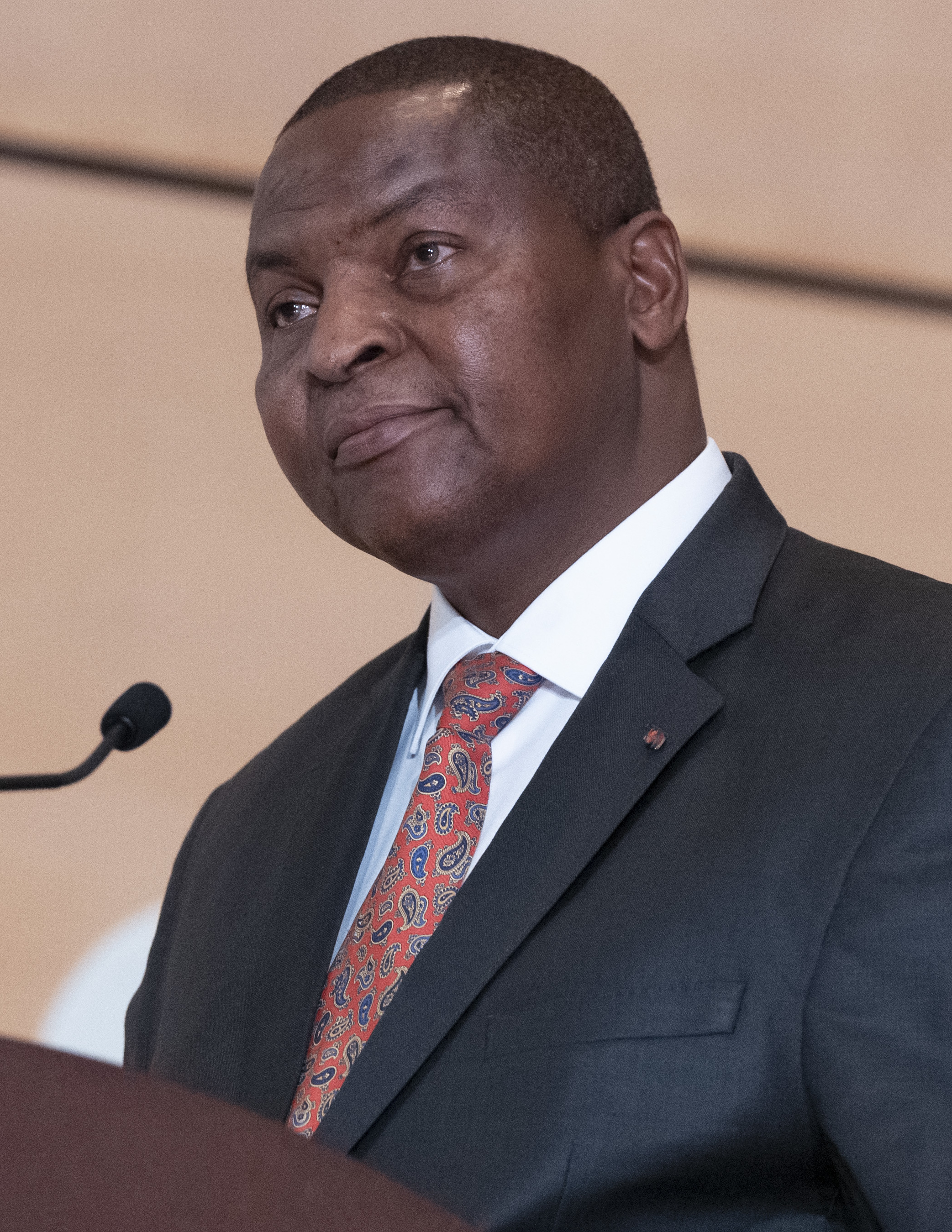

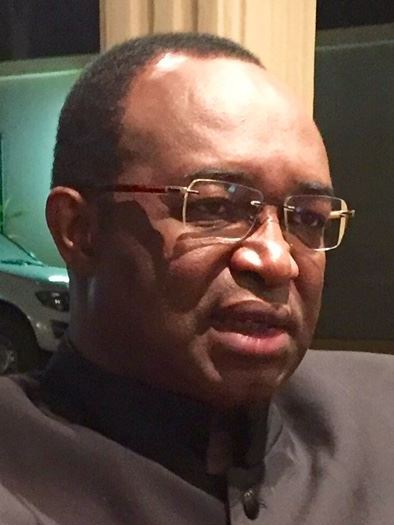

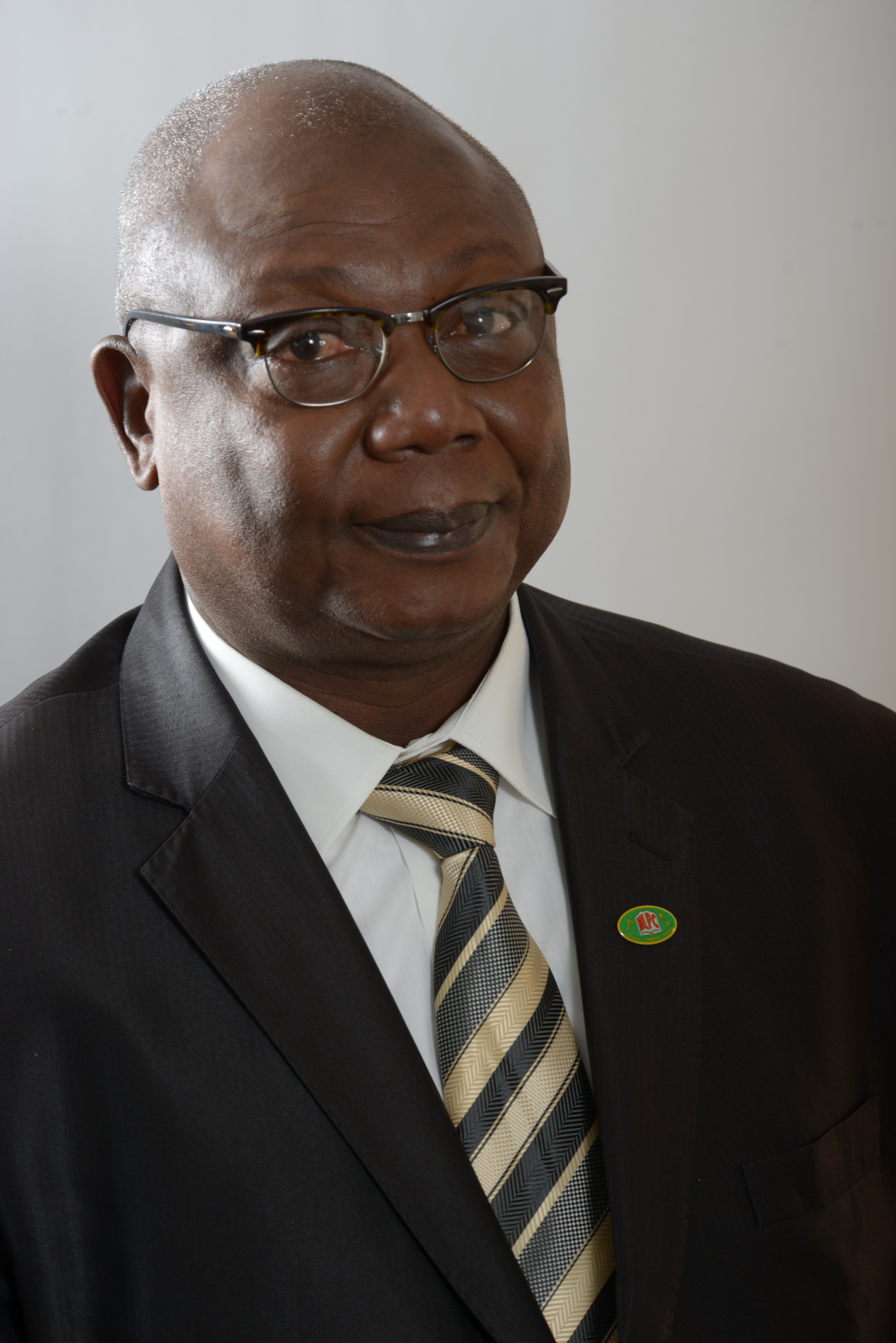
Nominee	Faustin-Archange Touadéra	Anicet-Georges Dologuélé	Martin Ziguélé
Party	MCU	URCA	MLPC
Popular vote	318,626	130,017	45,206
Percentage	53.16%	21.69%	7.54%
- Parliamentary results by sub-prefecture
President and National Assembly before election
Faustin-Archange Touadéra
MCU
Elected President and National Assembly
Faustin-Archange Touadéra
MCU

General elections were held in the Central African Republic on 27 December 2020 to elect the President and National Assembly. A second round of the legislative elections was originally scheduled to take place on 14 February 2021.

Voting was not able to take place in many areas of the country that are controlled by armed groups resulting in some Central African media and opposition candidates describing the elections as a farce and fraud. Some 800 of the country's polling stations, 14% of the total, were closed due to violence. During the first round, voting did not take place in 29 of 71 sub-prefectures, while in six others only a partial vote took place before being shut down due to voter intimidation.

Incumbent president Faustin-Archange Touadéra was re-elected with 53% of the vote. Turnout was 35% of registered voters.

On 13 February 2021 Touadéra announced a second round of elections in some areas and a new first round in areas that were controlled by rebels during the December elections. Respective elections for all areas were held on 14 March.

== Background ==
The previous presidential elections were the first to be held under the 2015 constitution, which established the 6th Republic. Faustin-Archange Touadéra won the elections, and took office on 30 March 2016.

Several obstacles affected the election process. The December 2020 election took place during the COVID-19 pandemic, prompting fears of possible postponement. However, the constitution prohibits any further extension of the term of the incumbent president beyond his term of office, which for Touadéra is 29 March 2021. The government attempted to amend the constitution, but the draft was rejected by the Constitutional Court on 5 June 2020. In addition, the country is also still subject to a UN peacekeeping operation, MINUSCA, while two-thirds of the country is controlled by rebellious armed groups.

In early September, the Constitutional Court gave the National Elections Authority (ANE) until 27 September to publish an updated voter registry. On 10 September, the opposition and several civil society groups publicly observed that the election would probably be delayed; in the event that the presidential and parliamentary terms would be extended, they demanded the formation of a unity government. For its part, the ANE announced that the registration of voters would be delayed until 8 October due to technical issues, but that the vote would not be postponed. The first round remained set for 27 December 2020 by the ANE.

== Electoral system ==
The President of the Central African Republic is elected by a two-round system for a five-year term, renewable only once. The candidate who receives an absolute majority of the votes cast in the first ballot is elected. If no majority is secured, a runoff is held between the top two candidates to decide the winner.

== Presidential candidates ==
On 3 December 2020, the Constitutional Court of Central African Republic accepted 17 candidatures for presidential elections:

- Faustin-Archange Touadéra (MCU)
- Anicet-Georges Dologuélé (URCA)
- Martin Ziguélé (MLPC)
- Sylvain Patassé
- Mahamat Kamoun
- Augustin Agou
- Crépin Mboli Goumba (fr)
- Serge Djorie
- Éloi Anguimaté (fr)
- Alexandre-Ferdinand Nguendet
- Abdoul Karim Meckassoua
- Catherine Samba-Panza
- Cyriaque Gonda
- Nicolas Tiangaye
- Kolingba Désiré
- Aristide Reboas
- Serge Bokassa

Five candidatures were rejected, including that of former president François Bozizé. He had announced his candidacy on 25 July 2020.

== Conduct ==
The rebel group Return, Reclamation, Rehabilitation banned voter registration for the elections in Koui and Ngaoundaye.

On 6 August 2020 UPC banned voter registration from taking in place in Bambouti in Haut-Mbomou demanding ransom. As of 15 October only 700 people were able to register to vote in Haut-Mbomou prefecture as a result of UPC and LRA presence in region.

The leaders of Return, Reclamation, Rehabilitation announced a coalition for the general election, a move that increased tensions ahead of the election, where the opposition feared massive voter fraud. The armed groups named themselves the Coalition of Patriots for Change (CPC) and invited other armed groups to join, while urging them to protect the integrity of civilians. Their aim was to pressure the government into postponing the elections. The coalition fought against MINUSCA peacekeepers as well as Russian and Rwandan troops until a ceasefire was declared on 23 December.

On 25 December, two days before the elections, unidentified armed gunmen attacked national security forces and international peacekeepers serving with the UN peacekeeping mission in the Central African Republic in Dékoa, central Kémo Prefecture, and Bakouma, southern Mbomou Prefecture. Three Burundian peacekeepers were killed and an additional two were wounded. The attack occurred hours after a rebel coalition fighting the government called off a unilateral truce and reiterated calls for the suspension of the election.

The attacks on the peacekeepers followed a general surge in violence across the Central African Republic, over the past few weeks, during which aid workers and properties have also been attacked. The insecurity and fear of violence has led to more than 55,000 people fleeing their homes.

During the first round, voting was unable to take place in 29 of the 71 sub-prefectures according to Augustin Yangana-Yahote, the Minister for Territorial Administration. Six others only managed to partially vote before being shut down due to voter intimidation.

Observers noted possible irregularities in the conduct of the election. An observer group reported that a large number of voters cast ballots with letters of exemption in Bangui. The procedure allows voters to cast their ballot elsewhere than the polling station where they are registered. According to the Rainbow Network, 81 percent of the votes were cast in this manner. Coordinating member of the same network, Origine Bekondi said, "Three days before the end of the mandate of the members of the ANE (the National Elections Authority), the president of the ANE proceeded to issue deregistration certificates to voters who had voted massively."

== Results ==
According to provisional results announced on 4 January by the National Elections Authority, Faustin-Archange Touadéra was re-elected for a second term with 53.92 percent of the vote. Anicet-Georges Dologuélé came second. Turnout among registered voters was 76.3%.

On 18 January, the Constitutional Court confirmed President Faustin Archange Touadera's victory with 53.16% of the vote but said turnout was 35.25%. Anicet Georges Dologuele had 21.69%. The court rejected a suit filed by 13 of the 16 other candidates, who argued that Touadera's victory was the result of "massive fraud" and insecurity. They annulled or revised the results from certain polling stations because of irregularities but said the impact could not have affected the overall outcome. Chief Judge Danièle Darlan declared, "Part of the Central African people, who are at war, were prevented by acts of terror... and despite this, the people sent a strong and clear message to those who were terrorising them, to those who were telling them not to vote, and to the whole world."

A coalition opposition political party, COD 2020, accused the U.N.'s representative, Mankeur Ndiaye, of favouring Touadera but did not present evidence. The streets of Bangui were far quieter than usual, and many people said they feared rebel attacks. Rebels had attacked a location on the city's outskirts before being pushed back on 13 January. Since December 2020, 60,000 people have fled the violence, many seeking refuge in the Democratic Republic of Congo.

=== President ===
Candidate	Party	Votes	%
Faustin-Archange Touadéra	United Hearts Movement	318,626	53.16
Anicet-Georges Dologuélé	Union for Central African Renewal	130,017	21.69
Martin Ziguélé	Movement for the Liberation of the Central African People	45,206	7.54
Désiré Kolingba	Central African Democratic Rally	22,157	3.70
Crépin Mboli Goumba	PATRIE	19,271	3.21
Sylvain Patassé	Central Africa New Momentum	8,760	1.46
Augustin Agou	Renaissance for Sustainable Development	8,436	1.41
Jean-Serge Bokassa	Kodro Ti Mo Kozo Si	7,870	1.31
Mahamat Kamoun	Central Africa for All of Us	7,536	1.26
Alexandre-Ferdinand Nguendet	Rally for the Republic	6,668	1.11
Karim Meckassoua	Path of Hope	5,099	0.85
Éloi Anguimaté	National Convention	5,078	0.85
Catherine Samba-Panza	Independent	3,710	0.62
Serge Djorie	CAPNCA	3,392	0.57
Cyriaque Gonda	National Party for a New Central Africa	2,973	0.50
Aristide Reboas	Christian Democratic Party	2,454	0.41
Nicolas Tiangaye	Republican Convention for Social Progress	2,163	0.36
Total		599,416	100.00
Valid votes		599,416	91.51
Invalid/blank votes		55,638	8.49
Total votes		655,054	100.00
Registered voters/turnout		1,858,236	35.25
Source: Constitutional Court

=== National Assembly ===
Party	Seats					Total seats	+/–
Party	First round (20 December)	Second round (14 March)	First round (14 March)	Second round (23 May)	Second round (25 July)	Total seats	+/–
United Hearts Movement	5	14	5	15	2	41	New
National Convergence "Kwa Na Kwa"	1	1	5	3	0	10	+3
Movement for the Liberation of the Central African People	1	2	4	0	1	8	0
Union for Central African Renewal	2	2	1	2	0	7	−6
National Movement of Independents	2	3	0	2	0	7	New
Central African Democratic Rally	0	5	0	0	0	5	−5
Path of Hope	0	1	0	2	0	3	New
PATRIE	3	0	0	0	0	3	New
Renaissance for Sustainable Development	0	2	0	0	0	2	New
New Impetus for Central Africa	0	0	0	1	1	2	New
Movement for Democracy and Development	0	2	0	0	0	2	0
Party for Democratic Governance	1	1	0	0	0	2	−1
Action Party for Development	0	0	1	1	0	2	+1
National Union of Republican Democrats	1	0	0	0	0	1	0
Central Africa for Us All	0	0	0	1	0	1	New
Transformation through Action Initiative	0	1	0	0	0	1	New
Party for Democracy and Solidarity–Kélémba	0	1	0	0	0	1	0
Alliance for Democracy and Progress	0	1	0	0	0	1	New
Central African Party for Integrated Development	0	0	0	1	0	1	New
National Union for Democracy and Progress	1	0	0	0	0	1	−12
Democratic Movement for the Renaissance and Evolution of Central Africa	0	1	0	0	0	1	New
Union for Renaissance and Development	0	0	0	1	0	1	New
Socialist Party	0	0	0	1	0	1	0
Kodro Ti Mo Kozo Si Movement	0	1	0	0	0	1	New
Independents	5	11	3	13	3	35	−21
Total	22	49	19	43	7	140	+9
Source: Journal de Bangui, LANOCA MINUSCA

==== Elected members ====
Constituency	Election date	Elected member	Party
1er arrondissement	First round (20 December)	Henri-Matie Dondra	United Hearts Movement
2e arrondissement 1	Second round (14 March)	Gabriel Mairie Raoul Follot	Central African Democratic Rally
2e arrondissement 2	Second round (14 March)	Mathurin Massikini	Central African Democratic Rally
3e arrondissement 1	Second round (23 May)	Zacharie Yaou Mafour	Independent (Action Party for Development)
3e arrondissement 2	Second round (23 May)	Ibrahim Ould Alhissene Algon (Note: Karim Meckassoua was initially elected, but the Constitutional Court overturned the result and declared Ould Alhissene Algon the winner on the basis that Meckassoua had been an ineligible candidate due to his involvement with the Coalition of Patriots for Change rebel coalition.)	United Hearts Movement
3e arrondissement 3	Second round (14 March)	Rachel Yassindali	Independent
4e arrondissement 1	Second round (14 March)	Ephrem Dominique Yandocka	Transformation through Action Initiative
4e arrondissement 2	Second round (14 March)	Louis Roi Nguehoroum	Union for Central African Renewal
5e arrondissement 1	Second round (14 March)	Louis Albert Goni	United Hearts Movement
5e arrondissement 2	Second round (14 March)	Ernest Konguere	United Hearts Movement
5e arrondissement 3	Second round (14 March)	Amédée Negba Kpingo	Renaissance for Sustainable Development
6e arrondissement 1	Second round (14 March)	José Titus Ngoungbo	Central African Democratic Rally
6e arrondissement 2	Second round (14 March)	Dominique Kakara Guerengbo	Independent
7e arrondissement	First round (20 December)	Christian Limbio Tekpe	Independent
8e arrondissement 1	Second round (14 March)	Thierry Ndomadji Legon Ndoyo	Independent
8e arrondissement 2	Second round (14 March)	Guy Samuel Nganatoua	Independent
Abba	Second round (23 May)	Marc Issa	National Convergence "Kwa Na Kwa"
Alindao 1	Second round (23 May)	Virginie-Béatrice Bandéko	United Hearts Movement
Alindao 2	Second round (23 May)	Geoffroy Noël Tagba	United Hearts Movement
Amada-Gaza	Second round (23 May)	Ousmane Gbalassoundou	National Convergence "Kwa Na Kwa"
Baboua 1	First round (14 March)	Laurent Ngon Baba	Action Party for Development
Baboua 2	First round (14 March)	Luc Ninga	Movement for the Liberation of the Central African People
Bakala	First round (20 December)	Dorothée Tiyangou	National Union for Democracy and Progress
Bakouma	Second round (25 July)	Gabin Dieudonne Mbolifouefele	United Hearts Movement
Bambari 1	Second round (23 May)	Rachel Ngakola	Central Africa for Us All
Bambari 2	Second round (23 May)	Aubin Amasseka Amoudou	United Hearts Movement
Bambari 3	Second round (23 May)	Anatole Ndemagouda Gbago	United Hearts Movement
Bambari 4	Second round (23 May)	Ali Saleh	United Hearts Movement
Bambio 1	Second round (14 March)	Aristide Goundissa	United Hearts Movement
Bambouti	First round (20 December)	Bernard Gbissigui Anioue	National Convergence "Kwa Na Kwa"
Bamingui	Second round (14 March)	Francisco Moundjouvouko	Path of Hope
Bangassou 1	Second round (14 March)	Maurice Bazzambo-Ngbongo	Independent
Bangassou 2	Second round (14 March)	Samuel Nzoungou	United Hearts Movement
Baoro 1	First round (14 March)	Simplice Sarandji	United Hearts Movement
Batangafo 1	Second round (23 May)	Jean De Dieu Damarass-Damangueré	United Hearts Movement
Batangafo 2	Second round (23 May)	Carmen Ducas	Independent
Bayanga	First round (20 December)	David Bernadette Gomina Pampali	National Union of Republican Democrats
Berbérati 1	Second round (14 March)	Jean Sosthène Dengbe	Independent
Berbérati 2	Second round (14 March)	Clément Ndombe	United Hearts Movement
Berbérati 3	First round (20 December)	Thierry Kamach	National Movement of Independents
Berbérati 4	First round (20 December)	André Nalké Dorogo	Union for Central African Renewal
Bimbo 1	Second round (14 March)	Rufin Brice Molomadon	Movement for Democracy and Development
Bimbo 2	Second round (14 March)	Henry Josée Gbogouda	Independent
Bimbo 3	Second round (14 March)	Joseph Bendounga	Democratic Movement for the Renaissance and Evolution of Central Africa
Bimbo 4	Second round (14 March)	Virginie Baïkoua	United Hearts Movement
Bimbo 5	Second round (14 March)	Annie Molomadon	Movement for Democracy and Development
Birao 1	Second round (14 March)	Daniel Andal Djouma	Independent
Birao 2	Second round (14 March)	Dekalve Chengaba Rossni	United Hearts Movement
Boali 1	First round (14 March)	Firmin Ngrébada	United Hearts Movement
Bocaranga 1	First round (14 March)	Anicet-Georges Dologuélé	Union for Central African Renewal
Bocaranga 2	Second round (23 May)	Fidèle Pandjikane	United Hearts Movement
Bocaranga 3	First round (14 March)	Martin Ziguélé	Movement for the Liberation of the Central African People
Boda	Second round (23 May)	Narcisse Dambalé	Independent
Boganangone	Second round (23 May)	Patrice Oféing Ali	National Convergence "Kwa Na Kwa"
Boganda 1	First round (14 March)	Michel Yembe	National Convergence "Kwa Na Kwa"
Bogangolo	Second round (23 May)	Jean Galvanis Gassiyombo	Independent
Bossangoa 1	First round (14 March)	Jean Barkes Ngombe-Kette	Independent
Bossangoa 2	Second round (23 May)	Christiane Dorazze Séréfessene	Independent
Bossangoa 3	First round (14 March)	Emilie Bernadette Gambo, Née Souaninzi	United Hearts Movement
Bossangoa 4	First round (14 March)	Marie Brigitte Bozeze	National Convergence "Kwa Na Kwa"
Bossembélé	Second round (23 May)	William Séraphin Wabem Mbeté	National Movement of Independents
Bossemptélé 1	First round (14 March)	Jacques Ngaina	National Convergence "Kwa Na Kwa"
Bouar 1	Second round (23 May)	Fleury Junior Pabandji	United Hearts Movement
Bouar 2	Second round (23 May)	Salamatou Be-yamissi Sana	United Hearts Movement
Bouar 3	First round (14 March)	Georges Yalakanga	National Convergence "Kwa Na Kwa"
Bouar 4	Second round (23 May)	Jonas Donon	Action Party for Development
Bouca 1	First round (20 December)	Justin Gourna Zako	United Hearts Movement
Bouca 2	Second round (14 March)	Jean-Bosco Namtoua-Koussi Guidomon	Movement for the Liberation of the Central African People
Bozoum 1	Second round (25 July)	Gervais Nguerekane	Movement for the Liberation of the Central African People
Bozoum 2	Second round (25 July)	Iledefonse Maurin Doui Gomhayama	Independent
Bria 1	First round (20 December)	Max Sylvain Balenda	Independent
Bria 2	Second round (23 May)	Jacques Tafago	Union for Central African Renewal
Carnot 1	First round (14 March)	Evariste Ngamana	Independent
Carnot 2	Second round (23 May)	Vivien Hervé Gaba	Independent
Carnot 3	Second round (14 March)	Jean Robert Gotao	Party for Democratic Governance
Damara 1	Second round (14 March)	Nestor Nali Mamadou	United Hearts Movement
Dédé-Makouba 1	Second round (14 March)	Serge Alain Liguela Mboutou	Movement for the Liberation of the Central African People
Dekoa	Second round (25 July)	Serge Frederic Yologaza	Independent
Djemah	First round (20 December)	Hermane Lambert Akovourou	African Party for Radical Transformation and Integration of States
Gadzi 1	Second round (25 July)	Trixi Serge Bapeh	United Hearts Movement
Gadzi 2	Second round (25 July)	Ingkossi Jansen Wandoui So	Independent
Gambo 1	Second round (14 March)	Michel Kpingo	United Hearts Movement
Gamboula 1	Second round (14 March)	Tefal Kolou	United Hearts Movement
Grimari 1	First round (20 December)	Sédar Sall Karim	United Hearts Movement
Ippy 1	First round (14 March)	Francis Rufin Ouatende	National Convergence "Kwa Na Kwa"
Ippy 2	Second round (23 May)	Christophe Arsène Wapou	United Hearts Movement
Kabo 1	Second round (23 May)	Chantal Merveille Tohomane	United Hearts Movement
Kabo 2	Second round (23 May)	Hugues Abdjaz Ndolingar	Path of Hope
Kaga-Bandoro 1	Second round (23 May)	Valérie Claude Bifane	Independent
Kaga-Bandoro 2	Second round (14 March)	Arme Birot	Kodro Ti Mo Kozo Si Movement
Kaga-Bandoro 3	Second round (23 May)	Simon Dangavo	Path of Hope
Kembé	First round (20 December)	Assindaka Didace	Independent
Kouango 1	Second round (23 May)	Barthelemy Louis-Marie Zoumara	Independent
Kouango 2	Second round (23 May)	Sylvain Marandji	Socialist Party
Koui	Second round (23 May)	Dahirou Mohamadou	United Hearts Movement
Mala1	First round (14 March)	Marthe Lakonte-Gaomeda	United Hearts Movement
Markounda 1	First round (14 March)	Emilie Béatrice Epaye	Independent
Mbaïki 1	Second round (14 March)	Brice Kevin Kakpayen	Independent
Mbaïki 2	Second round (14 March)	Jean Thalhys Bangue	Renaissance for Sustainable Development
Mbaïki 3	First round (20 December)	Hassan Akhras	Independent
Mbaïki 4	First round (20 December)	Jean Claude Ngonga	United Hearts Movement
Mbaïki 5	First round (20 December)	Magloire Jocelyn Makango	United Hearts Movement
Mbrès	Second round (23 May)	Thomas Rabé	National Movement of Independents
Mingala	Second round (23 May)	Firmin Endjizémo	Independent
Mobaye 1	Second round (14 March)	Aurélien Simplice Kongbelet-Zingas	Party for Democracy and Solidarity–Kélémba
Mobaye 2	First round (20 December)	Heureux Maxime Ngarendo	Independent
Mobaye 3	Second round (14 March)	Henri Mylla Vigner	National Movement of Independents
Mongoumba 1	Second round (14 March)	Joseph Ngoïta	United Hearts Movement
N'Délé 1	Second round (14 March)	Alime Aziza Soumaine	United Hearts Movement
N'Délé 2	First round (20 December)	François Moussa Yakota	Party for Democratic Governance
Nana-Bakassa 1	Second round (25 July)	Marie-Christiane Patassé	New Impetus for Central Africa
Nana-Bakassa 2	Second round (23 May)	Sylvain-Eugène Ngakoutou-Patassé	New Impetus for Central Africa
Nanga-Boguila	Second round (23 May)	Auguste Dokoane	Independent
Ndjoukou	Second round (23 May)	Jean-Claude Komia Sambia	Independent
Ngaoundaye 1	First round (14 March)	Bernard Dillah	Movement for the Liberation of the Central African People
Ngaoundaye 2	First round (14 March)	Antoine Koirokpi	Movement for the Liberation of the Central African People
Ngaoundaye 3	Second round (23 May)	Ernest Bonang	Union for Central African Renewal
Nola 1	Second round (14 March)	Pélagie Ngaïndiro	National Convergence "Kwa Na Kwa"
Nola 2	First round (20 December)	Marien Diodonné Djema	National Movement of Independents
Nola 3	Second round (14 March)	Sylvain Bombo	Independent
Obo 1	First round (20 December)	Ernest Mizédio	Union for Central African Renewal
Obo 2	Second round (14 March)	Albert Guinimonguimi	Union for Central African Renewal
Ouadda 1	Second round (14 March)	Abdel-Karim Nabia Koundjou	United Hearts Movement
Ouanda Djallé 1	Second round (14 March)	Idriss Sende Adam	Independent
Ouango 1	Second round (14 March)	Théophile Ngonda	Alliance for Democracy and Progress
Ouango 2	Second round (14 March)	Rodrigue Yvon Brice Sialo Ngboda	Central African Democratic Rally
Paoua 1	Second round (14 March)	Lucien Mbaîgoto	National Movement of Independents
Paoua 2	Second round (23 May)	Timoléon Mbaïkoua	Central African Party for Integrated Development
Paoua 3	Second round (14 March)	Romain Penendji-lami-ya	United Hearts Movement
Paoua 4	First round (20 December)	Percus Kette	Movement for the Liberation of the Central African People
Paoua 5	Second round (23 May)	Emmanuel Mamya	United Hearts Movement
Rafaï	First round (20 December)	Dieudonné Gbiatou	African Party for Radical Transformation and Integration of States
Satema 1	Second round (14 March)	Vidal De Bon Coeur Siopathis	Central African Democratic Rally
Sibut	Second round (23 May)	Félix Yangakola	Independent
Sosso-Nakombo 1	Second round (14 March)	Achanga Bertrand Nakombo	National Movement of Independents
Yalinga 1	First round (14 March)	Richard Gonguere	United Hearts Movement
Yaloké 1	Second round (23 May)	Auguste Boukanga	Union for Renaissance and Development
Yaloké 2	Second round (23 May)	Richard Steve Toranga	United Hearts Movement
Zangba	Second round (23 May)	Hissène Hamat	Independent
Zémio	First round (20 December)	Eric Gervais Kpiodigui	African Party for Radical Transformation and Integration of States
Source: Journal de Bangui, LANOCA

== Reactions and aftermath ==
Former president Bozizé, who had been barred from running, was put under investigation after the results were announced; he was accused of aiding the armed coalitions that attempted to disrupt the election. His location was unknown in early January, amid accusations by the UN that he was colluding with the rebels.

After the publication of the results, Dologuele told AFP that the electoral process was a farce. According to local journalist Fridolin Ngoulou, however, Mr Touadéra's victory was likely to prove lasting. Ngoulou commented: "Touadéra's vote was the expression of people fed up with armed groups who want to impose a setback for democracy. Touadéra will retain power as the entire international community supports these elections."

Fighting between rebel groups and the CAR's national army has continued around the country since the election. The rebels declared an intent to take the war to Bangui, but a combination of the army, UN peacekeepers and Russian troops have prevented them from doing so.
