= Parliament of the Central African Republic =

Legislative chamber of the Central African Republic

Parliament of the Central African Republic Parlement de la République centrafricaine

Type
- Type: Unicameral
- Houses: National Assembly

Leadership
- President: Simplice Sarandji, MCU since 5 May 2021

Structure
- Seats: 140
- Political groups: MCU (44); KNK (11); URCA (7); MOUNI (6); MLPC (4); RDC (4); Minor parties (37); Independents (27)

Elections
- Voting system: Two-round system
- Last election: 28 December 2025
- Next election: 2032

Meeting place
- Bangui

Constitution
- 2023 Constitution

The Parliament of the Central African Republic (French: Parlement de la République centrafricaine) is the unicameral legislature of the Central African Republic. It consists solely of the National Assembly (Assemblée nationale) with 140 members.

== History ==
The 2015 Constitution originally provided for a bicameral parliament consisting of the National Assembly and a Senate. However, the Senate was never established.

Following a constitutional referendum on 30 July 2023 and the promulgation of the new Constitution in August 2023, the Senate was formally abolished and the National Assembly became the sole chamber of Parliament. The parliamentary term was extended from five to seven years.

== Electoral system ==
Members of the National Assembly are directly elected in single-member constituencies using the two-round (run-off) system. The most recent elections were held on 28 December 2025 (with the new seven-year term applying to the legislature elected in 2025).
