= List of heads of state of the Central African Republic =

President of the Central African Republic
- Président de la République centrafricaine (French)
- Presidential standard

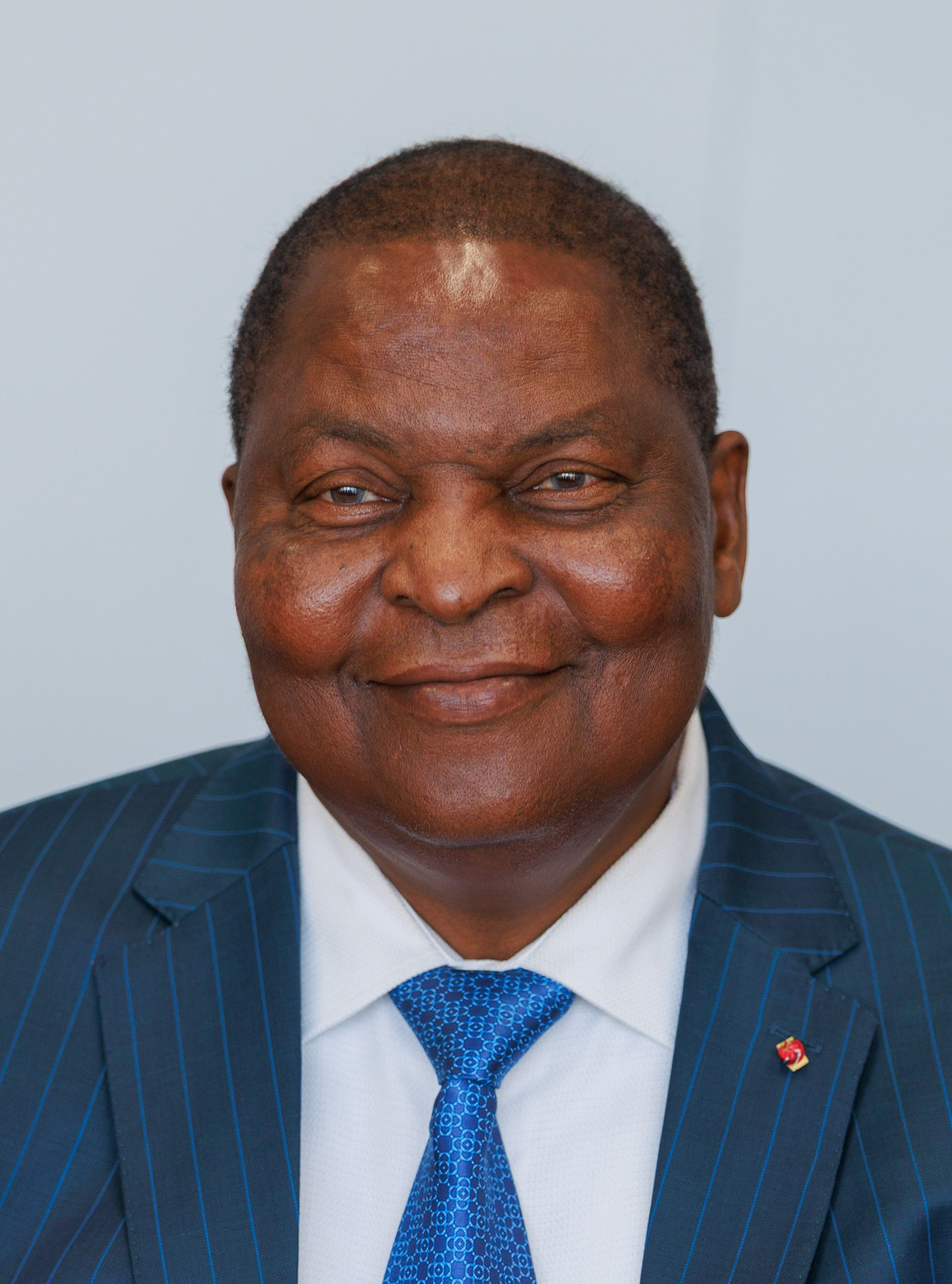
- Incumbent; Faustin-Archange Touadéra since 30 March 2016
- Member of: Council of Ministers
- Residence: Renaissance Palace
- Seat: Bangui
- Term length: Seven years, renewable
- Constituting instrument: Constitution of the Central African Republic
- Formation: 14 August 1960; 66 years ago 21 September 1979; 46 years ago (office reestablished)
- First holder: David Dacko
- Salary: €3,049 monthly

There have been eight heads of state of the Central African Republic and the Central African Empire since independence from France on 13 August 1960. This list includes not only those persons who were sworn into office as President of the Central African Republic but also those who served as de facto heads of state.

Jean-Bédel Bokassa served as a de facto head of state (and also reigned as emperor from 1976 to 1979), while David Dacko (who served as de facto head of state from 1979 to 1981), André Kolingba, Ange-Félix Patassé, and François Bozizé were elected into office at some point during their tenure. To date, Kolingba is the only former head of state of the Central African Republic to voluntarily step down from the office through a democratic process, following the 1993 general election.

The current president of the Central African Republic is Faustin-Archange Touadéra, since 30 March 2016. The president is the commander-in-chief of the armed forces.

== Succession ==
Before the adoption of the 2023 constitution, the president of the National Assembly was the constitutional successor of the president in the event of a vacancy.

== Term ==
Before the adoption of the 2023 constitution, there was a two-term limit for the president in the Constitution of the Central African Republic. The term limit was not met by any president. The constitution of 2023 removed term-limits and extended the presidential term from five years to seven years.

== List of officeholders ==
Political parties

Movement for the Social Evolution of Black Africa (MESAN)
Central African Democratic Union (UDC)
Central African Democratic Rally (RDC)
Movement for the Liberation of the Central African People (MLPC)
Rally for the Republic (RPR)
United Hearts Movement (MCU)

Other affiliations

Military
Independent

No.	Portrait	Name (Birth–Death)	Elected	Term of office			Political affiliation	Notes
No.	Portrait	Name (Birth–Death)	Elected	Took office	Left office	Time in office	Political affiliation	Notes
Central African Republic (1960–1976)
—		David Dacko (1930–2003); President of the Provisional Government	—	14 August 1960	12 December 1960^{[A]}	5 years, 140 days	MESAN	Dacko served as president of the government from 1 May 1959 until the country declared its independence on 13 August 1960.
1		David Dacko (1930–2003); President	1964	12 December 1960	1 January 1966	5 years, 140 days	MESAN	Dacko served as president of the government from 1 May 1959 until the country declared its independence on 13 August 1960.
2		Jean-Bédel Bokassa (1921–1996); President	—	1 January 1966^{[B]}	4 December 1976	10 years, 338 days	Military	Bokassa seized power from Dacko in a successful coup d'état. He changed his name to Salah Eddine Ahmed Bokassa after converting to Islam on 20 October 1976.
2		Jean-Bédel Bokassa (1921–1996); President	—	1 January 1966^{[B]}	4 December 1976	10 years, 338 days	MESAN^{[C]}	Bokassa seized power from Dacko in a successful coup d'état. He changed his name to Salah Eddine Ahmed Bokassa after converting to Islam on 20 October 1976.
Central African Empire (1976–1979)
1		Bokassa I (1921–1996); Emperor	—	4 December 1976^{[D]}	21 September 1979	2 years, 291 days	MESAN	Bokassa spent approximately US$20 million—one third of the country's annual budget—on his coronation ceremony on 4 December 1977.
Central African Republic (1979–present)
3		David Dacko (1930–2003); President	1981	21 September 1979^{[E]}	1 September 1981	1 year, 345 days	MESAN	This was Dacko's second time as president of the Central African Republic. In February 1980, Dacko established the Central African Democratic Union (UDC) as the country's only political party.
3		David Dacko (1930–2003); President	1981	21 September 1979^{[E]}	1 September 1981	1 year, 345 days	UDC	This was Dacko's second time as president of the Central African Republic. In February 1980, Dacko established the Central African Democratic Union (UDC) as the country's only political party.
—		André Kolingba (1936–2010); Chairman of the Military Committee of National Recovery	—	1 September 1981^{[F]}	21 September 1985^{[G]}	12 years, 51 days	Military	Kolingba seized power from Dacko in a successful coup d'état. Ange-Félix Patassé, with the assistance of François Bozizé, launched an unsuccessful coup d'état against the Kolingba government on 3 March 1982.
—		André Kolingba (1936–2010); President and head of state	—	21 September 1985	21 November 1986	12 years, 51 days	Military	Kolingba established the Central African Democratic Rally (RDC) as the country's only party in May 1986.
—		André Kolingba (1936–2010); President and head of state	—	21 September 1985	21 November 1986	12 years, 51 days	RDC	Kolingba established the Central African Democratic Rally (RDC) as the country's only party in May 1986.
4		André Kolingba (1936–2010); President	1986^{[H]}	21 November 1986	22 October 1993	12 years, 51 days	RDC	Kolingba established the Central African Democratic Rally (RDC) as the country's only party in May 1986.
5		Ange-Félix Patassé (1937–2011); President	1993^{[I]} 1999	22 October 1993	15 March 2003	9 years, 144 days	MLPC	Bozizé launched an unsuccessful coup d'état against the Patassé government on 28 May 2001.
6		François Bozizé (born 1946); President	2005; 2011	15 March 2003^{[J]}	24 March 2013	10 years, 9 days	Military	Bozizé seized power from Patassé in a successful coup d'état. Shortly after, he appointed Abel Goumba as prime minister. Goumba had served as acting prime minister in 1959, before being overthrown by Dacko.
6		François Bozizé (born 1946); President	2005; 2011	15 March 2003^{[J]}	24 March 2013	10 years, 9 days	Independent	Bozizé seized power from Patassé in a successful coup d'état. Shortly after, he appointed Abel Goumba as prime minister. Goumba had served as acting prime minister in 1959, before being overthrown by Dacko.
7		Michel Djotodia (born 1949); President	—	24 March 2013^{[K]}	18 August 2013	292 days	Military	Djotodia was the leader of the Séléka rebel coalition in the ongoing civil war.
—		Michel Djotodia (born 1949); Head of State of the Transition	—	18 August 2013	10 January 2014^{[L]}	292 days	Military	Djotodia was the leader of the Séléka rebel coalition in the ongoing civil war.
—		Alexandre-Ferdinand Nguendet (born 1972); Acting Head of State of the Transition	—	10 January 2014	23 January 2014	13 days	RPR	Nguendet succeeded Djotodia after his resignation due to the continued conflict.
—		Catherine Samba-Panza (born 1954); Head of State of the Transition	—	23 January 2014	30 March 2016	2 years, 67 days	Independent	Samba-Panza became the first female head of state of the Central African Republic.
8		Faustin-Archange Touadéra (born 1957); President	2015–16; 2020–21; 2025	30 March 2016	Incumbent	10 years, 161 days	Independent	Previously, Touadéra served as prime minister under Bozizé from 2008 until 2013.
8		Faustin-Archange Touadéra (born 1957); President	2015–16; 2020–21; 2025	30 March 2016	Incumbent	10 years, 161 days	MCU	Previously, Touadéra served as prime minister under Bozizé from 2008 until 2013.

== Footnotes ==
- ^{A} Dacko became the official President of the Central African Republic after defeating Abel Goumba in an internal power struggle. Dacko had support from the French government.
- ^{B} Bokassa seized power by staging a coup d'état from 31 December 1965 until 1 January 1966. Bokassa forced Dacko to officially resign from the presidency at 03:20 WAT (02:20 UTC) on 1 January.
- ^{C} Bokassa staged a military coup against the Dacko government on 31 December 1965 – 1 January 1966. After becoming president, Bokassa took control of MESAN and imposed one-party rule under MESAN.
- ^{D} Bokassa, then-president for life of the Central African Republic, instituted a new constitution at the session of the MESAN congress and declared the republic a monarchy, the Central African Empire (CAE). Bokassa became the emperor of the CAE as "Bokassa I".
- ^{E} By 1979, French support for Bokassa had all but eroded after the government's brutal suppression of rioting in Bangui and massacre of schoolchildren who had protested against wearing the expensive, government-required school uniforms. Dacko, who was Bokassa's personal adviser at the time, managed to leave for Paris where the French convinced him to cooperate in a coup to remove Bokassa from power and restore him to the presidency. The French successfully executed Operation Caban on 20–21 September 1979 and installed Dacko as president.
- ^{F} General Kolingba (who was also the armed forces chief of staff) overthrew Dacko from the presidency in a bloodless coup.
- ^{G} On 21 September 1985, Kolingba dissolved the Military Committee for National Recovery, and created the positions of head of state and president.
- ^{H} A constitution was adopted by a referendum on 21 November 1986 and Kolingba was elected to a six-year term in office.
- ^{I} The country held a multiparty presidential election on 22 August and 19 September 1993. Patassé was the candidate from the Movement for the Liberation of the Central African People party and ran on the platform that he would pay the previously withheld salaries to soldiers and civil servants. Patassé defeated Dacko, Kolingba, Bozizé and Abel Goumba to win the election.
- ^{J} Bozizé's second coup attempt was successful; he seized power in Bangui on 15 March 2003.
- ^{K} Djotodia ousted Bozizé in the 2012–13 conflict; he seized power in Bangui on 24 March 2013.
- ^{L} Under pressure from other central African heads of state gathered for a crisis summit on the situation in CAR, Djotodia resigned in N'Djamena, Chad on 10 January 2014.

== Latest election ==
Candidate	Party	Votes	%
Faustin-Archange Touadéra	United Hearts Movement	894,556	76.15
Anicet-Georges Dologuélé	Union for Central African Renewal	172,209	14.66
Henri-Marie Dondra	Republican Unity	37,525	3.19
Marcelin Yalemende	Independent	25,068	2.13
Serge Ghislain Djorie	Collective for Political Change for a New Central Africa	21,989	1.87
Eddy Symphorien Kparekouti	Party of Unity and Reconstruction	12,227	1.04
Aristide Briand Reboas	Christian Democratic Party	11,185	0.95
Total		1,174,759	100.00
Valid votes		1,174,759	93.65
Invalid votes		40,231	3.21
Blank votes		39,386	3.14
Total votes		1,254,376	100.00
Registered voters/turnout		2,392,946	52.42
Source: Autorité Nationale des Elections

== See also ==
- History of the Central African Republic
  - List of colonial governors of Ubangi-Shari
- Politics of the Central African Republic
- List of heads of government of the Central African Republic
- Vice President of the Central African Republic
