= Virginie Baïkoua =

Central African politician

Minister of Humanitarian Action and Solidarity
- In office 24 June 2021 – 8 January 2024
- President: Faustin-Archange Touadéra
- Prime Minister: Henri-Marie Dondra; Félix Moloua
- Preceded by: Position established
- Succeeded by: Josiane Lina Bemaka-Soui
- In office 12 September 2017 – 10 June 2021 (Note: as Minister of Humanitarian Action and National Reconciliation)
- President: Faustin-Archange Touadéra
- Prime Minister: Simplice Sarandji; Firmin Ngrébada
- Preceded by: Position established
- Succeeded by: Position abolished
- In office 11 April 2016 – 12 September 2017 (Note: as Minister of Social Affairs and National Reconciliation)
- President: Faustin-Archange Touadéra
- Prime Minister: Simplice Sarandji
- Preceded by: Florence Lydie Ndouba (as National reconciliation, political dialogue and the promotion of civic culture)
- Succeeded by: Position abolished

Personal details
- Born: 1966 or 1967
- Party: MCU

Virginie Baïkoua, also known as Virginie Mbaïkoua (born 1966 or 1967), is a Central African politician.

== Early life and career ==
Baïkoua was born in 1966 or 1967. Her origin is either Paoua or Bémaïdé. She is the daughter of general and rebel leader, Alphonse Mbaikoua. At 15, she participated in the Paoua youth women's association activities. She moved to Poitiers, France in 1986. In 1988, she lived in Lyon and worked as the executive secretary of at the Urban Community of Lyon Social and Sanitation sector until 2008. While living in Lyon, she got involved in the Central African diaspora.

In 2003, Baïkoua founded SOLISIDAC, an NGO that fought against HIV infection, sexually transmitted diseases (STDs), malaria, and tuberculosis and assisted vulnerable women. She was awarded the "one woman, one month, one story" campaign by Forum of International Solidarity Organizations of Migrants in 2014 for promoting the journey of migrant women in France to work at her country's origin.

== Political career ==
Baïkoua began her political career by nominating herself as the MP candidate for Bimbo IV district in the 2015–16 Central African general election. However, she failed to secure a seat in the National Assembly.

=== Minister of Social Affairs, National Reconciliation, Humanitarian Action, and Solidarity ===
On 11 April 2016, Sarandji appointed Baïkoua as the minister of Social Affairs and National Reconciliation, replacing Florence Lydie Ndouba. During the handover ceremony on 14 April 2016, she stipulated that social cohesion was the main priority. Under her tenure, she managed to close IDP camps in Bangui M'Poko International Airport. Apart from that, she also became the head of the mediation delegation for Bangassou peace dialogue process in 2017 and issued the cancellation of Marie Annick Service's group Organization of Central African Women (OFCA) congress following the Bangui High Court prohibition order of Marie Annick Service "from making use of the powers of the OFCA." In the World Humanitarian Day commemoration in Bangui on 19 August 2017, Baïkoua called armed groups to cease violence and participate in dialogue.

Under the Sarandji 2 government, Baïkoua served as the Minister of Humanitarian Action and National Reconciliation. In 2019, she signed tripartite agreements with Cameroon and the Democratic Republic of Congo on Central African refugee repatriation. Other than that, she launched the projects that brought back displaced people to Bangui and Berbérati funded by EU through Bekou" Trust Fund on 30 August 2018. She ran again for the 2020–21 Central African general election as a legislative candidate from MCU party representing Bimbo IV District and won the election. On 24 June 2021, Baïkoua was reappointed as the minister of humanitarian action under the name of Minister of Humanitarian Action and Solidarity.

During the 2023 Central African constitutional referendum, she joined the pro-referendum campaign group and became the member of Mobilization and Propaganda Commission. She stepped down as a minister of humanitarian Action and solidarity on 8 January 2024 and Josiane Lina Bemaka-Soui replaced her.

== Personal life ==
Baïkoua is married and has three children. She is the sister of Central African politician Timoléon Mbaïkoua.
