= Elections in the Central African Republic =

The Central African Republic elects on the national level a head of state – the president – and a legislature. The president is elected for a five-year term by the people. The National Assembly (Assemblée Nationale) has 105 members, elected for a five-year term using the two-round (or Run-off) system.

The country has a multi-party system, with two or three strong parties and a third party that is electorally successful. In the latest 2020–21 Central African general election, president Faustin-Archange Touadéra won his re-election bid.

== Latest ==
- 2025 Central African general election

== See also ==
- Electoral calendar
- Electoral system
- Censorship in the Central African Republic
