= Danièle Darlan =

Central African judge (born 1952)

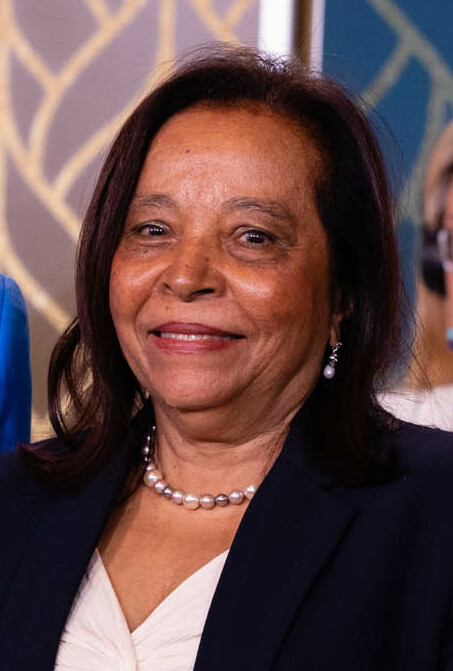
- Darlan in 2023

President of the Constitutional Court of the Central African Republic
- In office 2017 – October 2022
- Succeeded by: Jean-Pierre Waboe (acting)

Personal details
- Born: 1952 (age 73–74)
- Occupation: Lawyer, professor, jurist

Danièle Darlan (born 1952) is a Central African lawyer, professor and jurist who served as President of the country's Constitutional Court from 2017 to 2022. Her appointment was abruptly revoked by President Faustin-Archange Touadéra by a presidential decree in October 2022, with Jean-Pierre Waboe temporarily assuming her role on 28 October 2022.

== Early life and education ==
Darlan's father Georges Darlan was the president of the Representative Council of Ubangi-Shari from 1949 to 1952. She obtained a doctorate in law in France.

== Career ==
Darlan was professor of public law at the University of Bangui for thirty years, in a country where there are very few women professors, and low numbers of girls completing higher education. She has said, "I feel like it is a personal failure. Maybe I inspired someone outside the university; maybe I was more an example for boys than girls."

Darlan served as vice-president of the Constitutional Court from 2013, before being elected president in 2017. She is the first woman in the role. In June 2020, she refused to give approval to revisions of the Constitution proposed by the National Assembly and supported by President Touadéra, which would have allowed him to stay in power and delay the electoral process.

It was Darlan's role to declare the outcome of the controversial 2020–2021 election, declaring Touadéra's victory and rejecting a suit filed by 13 of the 16 other candidates arguing there had been "massive fraud". She said the court had "not received any pressure, either from the president, or from the special representative of the UN secretary general, or from any embassy."

In October 2022, Darlan was removed from her position by Touadéra, citing her age. The dismissal followed a Constitutional Court ruling in September 2022 that invalidated the committee tasked with drafting a new constitution, effectively blocking a referendum process that would have enabled constitutional changes supported by the president. According to Le Monde, the court held that constitutional revision could not proceed before the establishment of a Senate, which had not yet been created. In the weeks preceding her removal, demonstrations were held outside the court and threats were reportedly made against her. On 3 January 2023, the Constitutional Court ruled that Touadéra's decision had been unconstitutional; Darlan ultimately did not resume her role, having announced during the interim period that she would not return to the court. Following her retirement and dismissal, segments of civil society and opposition political groups called for the removal of President Touadéra from office.

== Recognition ==
In March 2023, Darlan was one of the recipients of that year's International Women of Courage Awards, presented by the United States Department of State in recognition of her tenure on the Central African Constitutional Court.

In January 2024, she was awarded the Franco-German Prize for Human Rights by the ambassadors of France and Germany in Bangui, becoming the first Central African recipient of the distinction, which recognises individuals for their commitment to defending human rights.

== Selected publications ==
- Darlan, Danièle (2018). L'évolution constitutionnelle et juridictionnelle de la République centrafricaine à travers les textes (in French). L'Harmattan. ISBN 9782140096358.
- Darlan, Danièle (2019). "Transitional elections in the Central African Republic, 2013– 2016". In Sead Alihodžić; Nicholas Matatu; Alexandre Raffoul (eds.). Timing and Sequencing of Transitional Elections: Case Studies (PDF). International IDEA. pp. 32–40.
