= Republican Unity =

Political party in the Central African Republic

Republican Unity Unité Républicaine
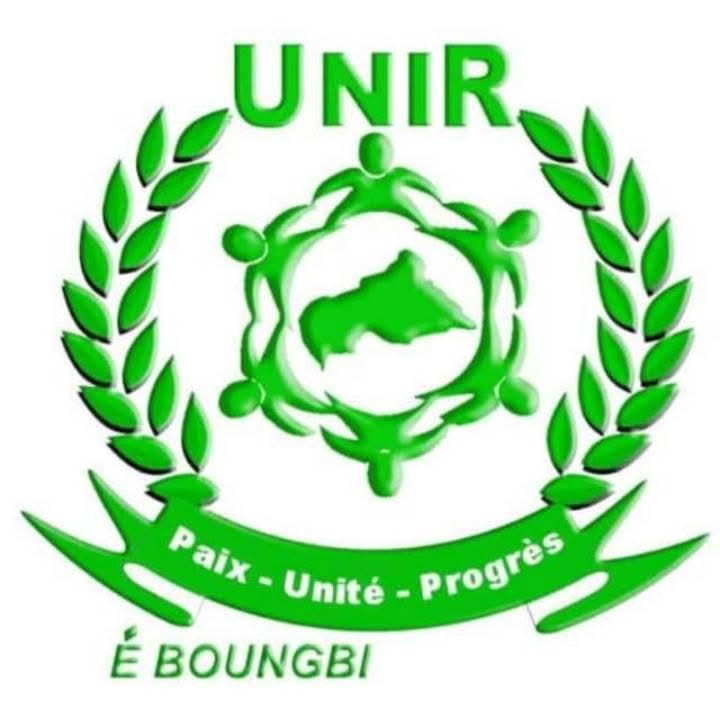
- Abbreviation: UNIR
- President: Henri-Marie Dondra
- Secretary-General: Gildas de Carême Benam
- Founded: 26 November 2023
- Registered: 5 December 2023
- Split from: United Hearts Movement
- Headquarters: Bangui
- Ideology: Centrism
- Political position: Centre
- Colors: Green
- Slogan: Paix - Unité - Progrès (Peace - Unity - Progress)

Website
- http://unir-rca.org/

Republican Unity (French: Unité Républicaine, UNIR) is a political party in the Central African Republic founded in 2023 by former Prime Minister Henri-Marie Dondra.

== History ==
=== Creation ===
On November 26 2023, Henri-Marie Dondra announced his intentions of starting a new political party, 21 months since his removal from the position of Prime Minister of the Central African Republic. The party was officially created on December 5 2023; it is self-described as politically centrist and reformist, voicing support for initiatives to foster peace, social cohesion and entrepreneurship.

=== 2025 Central African general election ===
UNIR officially endorsed Dondra's presidential bid for the 2025 Central African general election in May 2025. Dondra submitted his candidacy on October 8, but was not approved until November 14 due to the incumbent prime minister Faustin-Archange Touadéra accusing him of holding Congolese citizenship. Two of Dondra's brothers were arrested on March 19, leading Dondra's to assert the "gradual assassination of our democracy".

The election was held on November 28; according to official results, Dondra received 3.19% of the votes, the 3rd most behind the Touadéra of the Union for Central African Renewal and Anicet-Georges Dologuélé of the United Hearts Movement. Dondra accused the elections of being fraudulent and demanded an annulment of the results on behalf of the UNIR.

== Election results ==
=== Presidential elections ===
Election	Candidate	Votes	%	Votes	%	Result
Election	Candidate	First round		Second round		Result
2025	Henri-Marie Dondra	37,525	3.19% (#3)	—N/a		Lost ✗
