= 2025–26 Central African general election =

- 28 December 2025 – 26 April 2026
- Presidential election
- Registered: 2,398,158
- Turnout: 52.42% ▲17.17pp
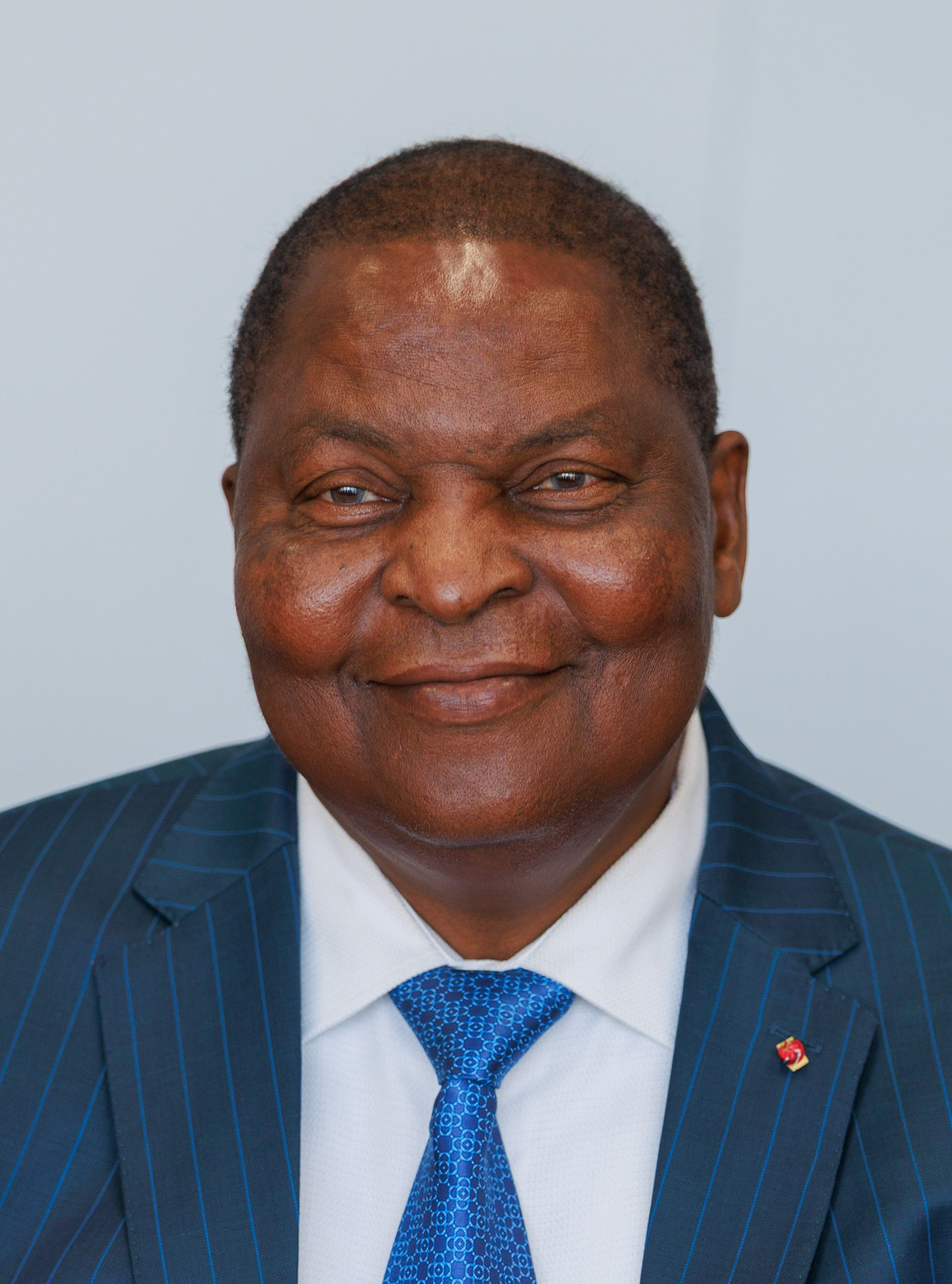

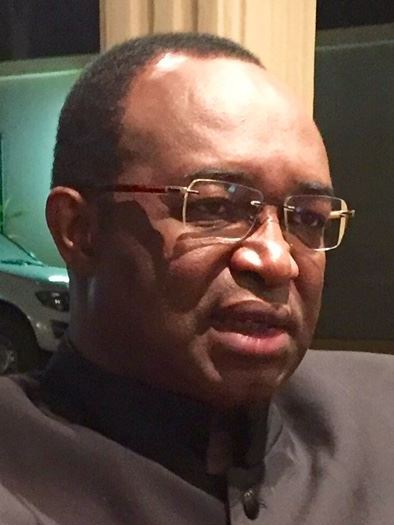
Candidate	Faustin-Archange Touadéra	Anicet-Georges Dologuélé
Party	MCU	URCA
Popular vote	894,556	172,209
Percentage	76.15%	14.66%
President before election
Faustin-Archange Touadéra
MCU
Elected President
Faustin-Archange Touadéra
MCU

General elections were held in the Central African Republic (CAR) on 28 December 2025 to elect both the president and National Assembly. A second round of the legislative elections was held on 26 April 2026. The incumbent president, Faustin-Archange Touadéra, was seeking a third term following the removal of term limits in a constitutional referendum. He was easily re-elected, defeating his main challenger, former prime minister Anicet-Georges Dologuélé, with more than seventy percent of the vote.

The election was marred by allegations of repression, with the ruling United Hearts Movement of President Touadéra being accused of repressing political opposition and attempting to prevent opposition candidates from contesting the election.

== Background ==
President Faustin-Archange Touadéra was initially limited to two terms, by term limits set in the constitution; however, he put forward revisions to the constitution that would remove term limits and extend presidential terms from 5 years, to 7. In 2023, a referendum was called to ratify these changes. Danièle Darlan, head of the Constitutional Court, ruled that the proposed referendum was illegal, but she was replaced by Touadéra. Opposition parties boycotted the referendum but it was approved with 95% of the vote. The Wagner Group provided security and logistical support for the conduct of referendum.

Opposition leaders, such as Dominique Yandocka, were imprisoned despite their immunity as members of Parliament and opposition parties were banned from holding rallies. 570,000 voters were registered by MINUSCA. By February 2025, 98% of the voter registration centres in the CAR were open, although 58 were still closed due to violence, and voter list revisions were done in 11 out of 20 prefectures. Human Rights Watch expressed concerns about the conduct of the election.

== Electoral system ==
The President of the Central African Republic is elected by a two-round system for a seven-year term, renewable. The candidate who receives an absolute majority of the votes cast in the first ballot is elected. If no majority is secured, a runoff is held between the top two candidates to decide the winner. In July 2025, officials announced that elections for local and municipal offices, which were due to be held in August 2025 after a nearly 40-year hiatus, were to instead be held concurrently with the presidential election. On 7 August, the CAR's electoral commission announced that the election would be held on 28 December 2025. In the event of a runoff in the presidential race, a second round of voting will be held in February 2026, while a runoff for parliamentary seats will be held on 5 April 2026.

== Candidates ==
On 14 November 2025, the Constitutional Court of the CAR approved seven and rejected three candidates for president. The candidates were:

- Faustin-Archange Touadéra, a member of the United Hearts Movement and the incumbent president.
- Anicet-Georges Dologuélé a member of the Union for Central African Renewal.
- Henri-Marie Dondra, a member of the Republican Unity (UNIR).
- Serge Gislan Djory, a member of the Collective for Political Change for a New Central Africa.
- Aristide Brian Ribois, a member of the Christian Democratic Party.
- Eddy Simforian Kabarkuti, a member of the Party of Unity and Reconstruction.
- Marcelin Yalimende, an independent candidate.

== Conduct ==
Preparations for the election faced scrutiny regarding institutional readiness and security. The National Authority of Elections (ANE) worked to finalise voter lists and logistics under difficult conditions, with support from international partners and domestic observer groups. The United Nations called for reforms to strengthen the independence and capacity of electoral institutions, noting that the process is taking place amid fragile security and limited resources.

=== Campaign ===
Campaigning began on 13 December 2025. Both Georges Dologuélé and Henri-Marie Dondra accused authorities of hindering their campaign activities through travel restrictions and preventing related events, which was denied by officials of the United Hearts Movement.

=== Challenges and criticisms ===
Observers and opposition figures raised concerns about the credibility of the upcoming elections. Reports highlight logistical delays, incomplete voter rolls, and the closure of registration centres in conflict-affected areas. The 2023 constitutional referendum, which allowed President Touadéra to seek a third term, also drew criticism for being conducted in a restricted political environment. Security conditions and limited funding continue to pose challenges that could affect the transparency and inclusiveness of the December 2025 vote. In October 2025, the CAR's main opposition bloc, the Republican Bloc for the Defense of the Constitution, said it will boycott the election, citing an unequal political environment.

=== Observers ===
More than 1,700 local and international observers were accredited to monitor the election. The African Union (AU) observer mission sent monitors to three of the CAR's 20 prefectures. Bernard Makuza, an AU delegation representative, said that elections were held peacefully except in Haut-Mbomou, and complied with the legal framework in force, which he said was an improvement over the 2016 and 2020 elections.

== Results ==
Provisional results announced on 6 January 2026 by the ANE showed that Faustin-Archange Touadéra was re-elected for a third term with 76.15% of the vote. Anicet-Georges Dologuélé came second, receiving 14.66% of the vote. Former prime minister Henri-Marie Dondra came third, receiving 3.19% of the vote. Turnout among registered voters was 52.42%. Both Dologuélé and Dondra disputed the results, citing alleged malpractice by the ANE and widespread electoral fraud. Dologuélé declared himself the winner of the presidential election and filed a protest before the Constitutional Court on 6 January. On 19 January, the Constitutional Court rejected his appeal and officially declared Touadéra as the winner in the presidential race, having won 77.9% of the vote, followed by Dologuélé with 13.1%.

The runoff for parliamentary and local elections was held on 26 April 2026, but the results of the vote in 70 constituencies have been delayed after staff of the ANE launched a strike protesting against two months of delayed salaries.

=== President ===
Candidate	Party	Votes	%
Faustin-Archange Touadéra	United Hearts Movement	894,556	76.15
Anicet-Georges Dologuélé	Union for Central African Renewal	172,209	14.66
Henri-Marie Dondra	Republican Unity	37,525	3.19
Marcelin Yalemende	Independent	25,068	2.13
Serge Ghislain Djorie	Collective for Political Change for a New Central Africa	21,989	1.87
Eddy Symphorien Kparekouti	Party of Unity and Reconstruction	12,227	1.04
Aristide Briand Reboas	Christian Democratic Party	11,185	0.95
Total		1,174,759	100.00
Valid votes		1,174,759	93.65
Invalid votes		40,231	3.21
Blank votes		39,386	3.14
Total votes		1,254,376	100.00
Registered voters/turnout		2,392,946	52.42
Source: Autorité Nationale des Elections
