= French frigate Virginie =

French frigate Virginie may refer to:

- French frigate Virginie (1794), lead Virginie-class frigate
- French frigate Virginie (1842)

== See also ==
- Virginie (disambiguation)
