= 2015–16 Central African general election =

- Presidential election
- 30 December 2015 (first round); 14 February 2016 (second round)
- Turnout: 62.54% (first round); 59.01% (second round)
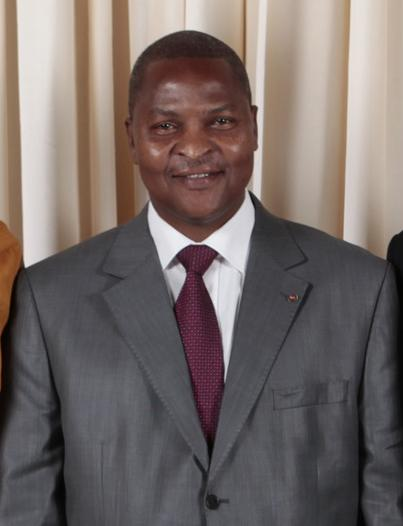

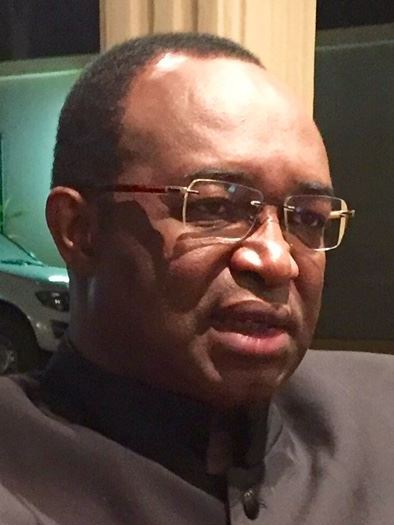
Nominee	Faustin-Archange Touadéra	Anicet-Georges Dologuélé
Party	Independent	URCA
Popular vote	695,059	413,352
Percentage	62.71%	37.29%
- Second round results by prefecture
President before election
Catherine Samba-Panza
(Transitional Head of State)
Independent
Elected President
Faustin-Archange Touadéra
Independent
- Legislative election
- 14 February 2016 (first round); 31 March 2016 (second round)
Party	Seats	+/–
UNDP	13	New
URCA	13	New
RDC	10	+9
MPLC	9	+8
Kwa Na Kwa	7	−54
PATRIE	4	New
PGD	3	New
RPR	3	New
PARC	3	New
CRPS	2	New
MDD	2	0
PS	1	New
UNADER	1	0
MNS	1	New
PAD	1	−2
PDSK	1	New
PUN	1	+1
Independents	56	+30
This lists parties that won seats. See the complete results below.

General elections were held in the Central African Republic on 30 December 2015 to elect the president and National Assembly. As no presidential candidate received more than 50% of the vote, and following the annulling of the results of the National Assembly elections by the Transitional Constitutional Court, a second round of the presidential elections and a re-run of the parliamentary elections were held on 14 February 2016, with second round run-offs for the parliamentary elections on 31 March.

The elections were delayed several times. The original elections were scheduled for 18 October, then postponed, whilst the second round of presidential elections was set for 31 January 2016. Acting President Catherine Samba-Panza was not allowed to stand as a candidate.

Following the second round of presidential elections, former prime minister Faustin-Archange Touadéra was declared the winner with 63% of the vote, defeating Union for Central African Renewal candidate Anicet-Georges Dologuélé, another former prime minister.

== Background ==
Despite the 25 August 2012 signing of a peace agreement between the government and the Convention of Patriots for Justice and Peace (CPJP) that promised closure of the Bush War, political violence continued in the eastern and central parts of the country. Then, on 10 December 2012, fighters from the Séléka rebel coalition seized the towns of N'Délé, Sam Ouandja and Ouadda. Following further battlefield successes through the month, the government called for support from former coloniser France and the United States. Though the offer was spurned, other central African states and South Africa sent in troops to secure the country and its capital, Bangui, from Séléka.

On 11 January 2013, a ceasefire agreement was signed in Libreville, Gabon, between the government, Séléka and the political opposition. The agreement led to a dropping of the demand for President François Bozizé's resignation, but required that he appoint a new prime minister from the opposition. The National Assembly of the Central African Republic was also dissolved within a week, with a year-long coalition government formed in its place and a new election called for within 12 months. The interim government would implement judicial reforms, amalgamate the rebel troops with government soldiers to establish a new national military, and introduce other social and economic reforms. The government was also required to free all political prisoners imprisoned during the conflict and that foreign troops must return to their countries of origin. Séléka was not required to give up the cities they had taken or were occupying in order to ensure that the government would not renege on the agreement.

Following the ousting of Bozizé in March 2013, Michel Djotodia became president. In the ensuing months atrocities were committed by the Seleka and the newly formed Christian anti-balaka groups. Djotodia eventually left and the Mayor of Bangui, Catherine Samba-Panza, was made interim president. However, instability and sectarian violence continued in the lead up to the election.

== Candidates ==
Kwa Na Kwa, the former ruling party loyal to Bozizé, announced on 10 August 2015 that Bozizé would return to the country and stand as a candidate in the October 2015 presidential election. KNK Secretary-General Bertin Bea complained that the transitional authorities were trying to obstruct his bid, however. A few days later, Bea was arrested, purportedly for "inciting disorder" two months earlier.

On 8 December 2015, the Constitutional Court announced the list of approved presidential candidacies. Bozizé's candidacy was among those rejected. Officially, he was excluded because he was not registered on the voter list and because he had agreed not to run again as part of the peace agreement in January 2013, two months before he was ousted. Gunfire was subsequently reported in parts of Bangui, as his supporters reacted angrily to the news. The KNK said that Bozizé's exclusion was "the result of internal and external pressure", with many of his supporters alleging that the French government was involved in the decision. About 30 candidates were approved to run, including three former prime ministers (Anicet Georges Dologuélé, Martin Ziguélé, and Faustin Archange Touadéra) and three sons of former presidents (Désiré Kolingba, Sylvain Patassé, and Jean-Serge Bokassa).

== Campaign ==
Prior to the election, a constitutional referendum was held on 13–14 December 2015. Results announced on 21 December showed that the referendum passed with 93% support. On 22 December, the official campaigning period began. Presenting himself as a candidate of peace and inclusion, Anicet Georges Dologuélé declared that he had "never held a weapon" and said that Bozizé would be able to play some unspecified role in national affairs. On the same day, the KNK announced its support for Dologuélé.

On 24 December acting Prime Minister Mahamat Kamoun stated that the elections would be postponed to 30 December, to allow further preparations.

== Conduct ==
The polls were characterized by insecurity, and many voters could not participate because of the dire security situation and were instead seeking refuge in other countries. The government failed to set up an absentee voting system. However, there were many irregularities, though fears of widespread violence were not realized and the African Union regarded the elections as successful.

== Results ==
=== President ===
Results for Bangui, released on 2 January 2016, showed Faustin-Archange Touadéra placing first (30,999 votes), Anicet Georges Dologuélé placing second (28,162 votes), Désiré Kolingba placing third (25,055 votes), Jean-Serge Bokassa placing fourth (10,672 votes), and Martin Ziguélé placing fifth (9,946 votes). Although results from the rest of the country were not given at the time, overall turnout was placed at 72.2%. Further results released on 3 January, accounting for about 25% of all votes, showed Touadéra with about 23% of the vote (about 120,000 votes), far ahead of Dologuélé, in second place with about 68,500 votes. By 6 January, results accounting for about 77% of votes showed Dologuélé in the lead with 259,211 votes, followed by Touadéra with 222,391 votes and all of the other candidates trailing far behind.

Provisional results announced by Marie-Madeleine Nkouet, the President of the National Election Authority, on 7 January 2016 showed Dologuélé in first place with 23.78% of the vote and Touadéra in second place with 19.42% of the vote. A second round of voting between Dologuélé and Touadéra was expected. The Transitional Constitutional Court approved the final results on 25 January, putting Dologuélé in first place with 23.74% of the vote and Touadéra second with 19.05%.

The electoral commission announced on 20 February 2016 that Touadéra won the second round with 62.71% of the vote, defeating Dologuélé. Although Dologuélé alleged fraud, he nevertheless stated that "for the sake of peace" he accepted the official results, would not appeal, and "recognize[d] Faustin-Archange Touadéra as the leader of all Central Africans". The Constitutional Court validated the results and formally declared Touadéra to be elected as president on 1 March.

Candidate	Party	First round		Second round	
Candidate	Party	Votes	%	Votes	%
Anicet-Georges Dologuélé	Union for Central African Renewal	268,952	23.74	413,352	37.29
Faustin-Archange Touadéra	Independent	215,800	19.05	695,059	62.71
Désiré Kolingba	Central African Democratic Rally	136,398	12.04		
Martin Ziguélé	Movement for the Liberation of the Central African People	129,474	11.43		
Jean-Serge Bokassa	Independent	68,705	6.06		
Charles-Armel Doubane	Independent	41,095	3.63		
Jean-Michel Mandaba	Party for Democratic Governance	35,458	3.13		
Sylvain Patassé-Ngakoutou	Central African New Momentum	31,261	2.76		
Abdou Karim Meckassoua	Independent	31,052	2.74		
Gaston Mandata Nguérékata	Party of the Central African Renaissance	22,391	1.98		
Jean-Barkès Ngombe-Ketté	Independent	18,949	1.67		
Timoléon Baikoua	Independent	17,195	1.52		
Fidèle Gouandjika	Independent	15,356	1.36		
Théodore Kapou	Independent	13,295	1.17		
Marcel Dimassé	Socialist Party	8,791	0.78		
Guy Moskit	National Solidarity Movement	8,712	0.77		
Jean Willybiro-Sako	Independent	8,535	0.75		
Émile Gros Raymond Nakombo	Independent	8,001	0.71		
Régina Konzi-Mongot	Independent	6,684	0.59		
Xavier Sylvestre Yangongo	Independent	6,512	0.57		
Cyriaque Gonda	National Party for a New Central Africa	6,440	0.57		
Laurent Gomina-Pampali	National Union for Democracy and Rally	5,834	0.51		
Constant Gouyomgbia Kongba Zézé	Independent	5,560	0.49		
Joseph Yakété	Forum for the Central African Rally	5,547	0.49		
Mathias Barthélemy Morouba	Independent	5,156	0.46		
Théophile Sony Colé	Syndical Union of Central African Workers	3,784	0.33		
Maxime Kazagui	Alliance for a New Central Africa	2,886	0.25		
Jean-Baptiste Koba	Independent	2,010	0.18		
Stanislas Moussa-Kembe	Independent	1,706	0.15		
Olivier Gabirault	Independent	1,347	0.12		
Total		1,132,886	100.00	1,108,411	100.00
Valid votes		1,132,886	92.69	1,108,411	96.11
Invalid/blank votes		89,370	7.31	44,889	3.89
Total votes		1,222,256	100.00	1,153,300	100.00
Registered voters/turnout		1,954,433	62.54	1,954,433	59.01
Source: Afrique News Info, IFES

=== National Assembly ===
The second round of the parliamentary election was held on 31 March 2016. Provisional results in early April, combined with the already certified results from the first round in February, showed 17 parties winning seats, but none of them with more than 13 seats. Independent candidates won a total of 56 seats.

Party	First round			Second round			Total seats	+/–
Party	Votes	%	Seats	Votes	%	Seats	Total seats	+/–
National Union for Democracy and Progress			5			8	13	New
Union for Central African Renewal			3			10	13	New
Central African Democratic Rally			2			8	10	+9
Movement for the Liberation of the Central African People			3			6	9	8
National Convergence "Kwa Na Kwa"			3			4	7	–54
African Party for a Radical Transformation and Integration of the State			1			3	4	New
Party for Democratic Governance			2			1	3	New
Rally for the Republic			1			2	3	New
Party of the Central African Renaissance			0			3	3	New
Republican Convention for Social Progress			1			1	2	New
Movement for Democracy and Development			1			1	2	0
Socialist Party			1			0	1	New
National Union for Democracy and Rally			1			0	1	0
National Solidarity Movement			0			1	1	New
Action Party for Development			0			1	1	–2
Party for Democracy and Solidarity–Kélémba			0			1	1	New
National Unity Party			0			1	1	+1
Independents			22			34	56	+30
Total			46			85	131	+31
Registered voters/turnout				1,225,300	–			
Source: ANERCA, ANERCA

== Aftermath ==
Touadéra was sworn in on 30 March 2016. Speaking on the occasion, he vowed to pursue disarmament and "make CAR a united country, a country of peace, a country facing development".

He appointed Simplice Sarandji, his campaign director, as Prime Minister on 2 April 2016, and the composition of the new government was announced on 11 April 2016. Three presidential candidates who backed Touadéra in the second round were included in the government: Jean-Serge Bokassa as Minister of the Interior, Charles-Armel Doubane as Minister of Foreign Affairs, and Joseph Yakété as Minister of National Defense. Several new ministers had previously served in the government under Bozizé, and under Touadéra while he was Bozizé's Prime Minister; it was suggested that they were appointed because of their experience in working under Touadéra, and not because of any connections to Bozizé. No representatives of the Seleka rebel group or the "anti-balaka" militias were included in the government.

Karim Meckassoua, a defeated presidential candidate who was also elected to the National Assembly, was elected as President of the National Assembly on 6 May 2016. He received 65 votes against 24 for Anicet-Georges Dologuélé and 14 for Martin Ziguélé.
