= UNIR =

UNIR may refer to:

== Universities ==
- Universidad Internacional de La Rioja, Spanish University

== Political parties ==
- National Leftist Revolutionary Union, Colombia; defunct
- National Union for Independence and Revolution, Chad; defunct
- Revolutionary Left Union, Peru; defunct
- Union for Rebirth / Sankarist Party, Burkina Faso
- Union for the Republic (Togo)
- Union for the Republic – National Movement, Democratic Republic of the Congo
- UNIR Constitutional Nationalist Party, Argentina
- Union des nationaux indépendants et républicains, Defunct pro-Petainist party in France
- Republican Unity, Central African Republic

== Other uses ==
- Federal University of Rondônia, in Brazil
