= Virginie (disambiguation) =

Virginie was a French language Canadian television series that aired from 1996 through 2010.

Virginie may also refer to:

- Virginie (given name), a French feminine given name
- Virginie (film), a 1962 French comedy film
- Virginie-class frigate, a type of seven 44-gun frigates of the French Navy
- French frigate Virginie (1794), a 44-gun frigate of the French Navy
- "Virginie", an episode of Bel Ami

== See also ==
- Carry Me Back to Old Virginny, a 19th century American song
