= Emilie Béatrice Epaye =

Central African politician and educator

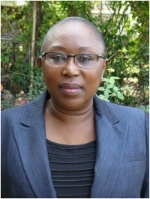
- Emilie Béatrice Epaye in 2015

Minister of Commerce, Industry and Small and Medium Enterprises
- In office 19 June 2005 – 2 September 2006
- President: François Bozizé
- Prime Minister: Élie Doté
- Preceded by: Didier Wangué
- Succeeded by: Rosalie Koudounguere

Minister of Trade and Industry
- In office 28 January 2008 – 22 April 2011
- President: François Bozizé
- Prime Minister: Faustin-Archange Touadéra
- Preceded by: Rosalie Koudounguere
- Succeeded by: Mouliom Roosalem

Personal details
- Born: ca. 1956
- Occupation: Politician; Educator
- Known for: Director of The Voice of the Heart Foundation

Emilie Béatrice Epaye is a Central African politician and educator. She has been a Government Minister and served in the National Assembly. Epaye advocates for better governance, economic development, and civil society freedoms, defends respect for human rights, and promotes national reconciliation. In 2015, she won the U.S. State Department's International Women of Courage Award.

== Biography ==
Emilie Béatrice Epaye was born about 1956 and trained to be a teacher. She has operated a family-run transportation business and engaged in trade.

=== La Fondation la Voix du coeur ===
La Fondation la Voix du coeur (The Voice of the Heart Foundation) was established in 1994 by Lucienne Patassé, wife of then president Ange-Félix Patassé, to mentor street children. The home she created, located in Bangui, was originally a haven from violence or abandonment where children are fed, educated, given medical care and provided with training and safe haven. Upon Lucienne Patassé's death in 2000, Epaye took over directorship of the organization.

=== Political career ===
In 2003 General François Bozizé led a coup against the former leader Patassé of the Central African Republic and took over the government. He established a broad-based transitional council including most of the opposition parties, and charged them with drafting the 2004 constitution. Epaye was appointed as President of the Foreign Affairs Commission of the National Assembly and as a member of the National Transitional Council from 2003 to 2005. In 2005 she began serving as the Minister of Commerce, Industry and Small and Medium Enterprises and held the position for five years. In 2008 she became the Minister of Trade and Industry and held that position through 2011.

In 2013 a coalition of armed groups calling themselves the Séléka (Alliance in the Sango language) overthrew Bozizé's government. Michel Djotodia declared himself president and plunged the country into a crisis. Djotodia's Muslim leadership in the largely Christian country resulted in the formation of militias, sectarian violence, and finally an agreement by Djotodia to step down. The UN Security Council, African Union and French government sent troops to assist in stabilizing the area and a new Transitional Council was appointed. Epaye again was tapped to serve in the transitional government and Catherine Samba-Panza was elected to lead the country during the transition. The next democratic elections will be held end of 2015.

=== Pan African organizations ===
From 2003-2005, Epaye was a member of the Inter-Parliamentary Commission of the Economic and Monetary Community of Central Africa (CEMAC). She chaired the African Intellectual Property Organization (OAPI) beginning in 2008 and as a member of the Board of Directors, she drove the first African Conference on Intellectual Property in Dakar. She also served on the Council of Ministers of the Economic Union of Central Africa (CAEU), which in 2010 awarded her the Medal of Grand Officer of the Order of Merit from the CEMAC Community
