= MLPC =

MLPC may refer to:

- Communist Party of Canada (Marxist-Leninist)
- Movement for the Liberation of the Central African People
- Market Lavington Parish Council
