= Virginie (given name) =

Virginie is a French feminine given name. It may refer to:

- Virginie Augustin (born 1973), French comic book artist
- Virginie Amélie Avegno Gautreau (1859–1915), French socialite
- Virginie Atger (21st century), French jockey
- Virginie Baïkoua (born 1966 or 1967), Central African politician
- Virginie Boutaud (born 1963), French Brazilian musician
- Virginie Caillé-Bastide (born 1962), French writer
- Virginie Chaloux-Gendron, Canadian writer
- Virginie Claes (born 1982), Belgian model
- Virginie Cueff (born 1988), French racing cyclist
- Virginie Déjazet (1798–1875), French actress
- Virginie Despentes (born 1969), French novelist and filmmaker
- Virginie Duby-Muller (born 1979), French politician
- Virginie Efira (born 1977), Belgian actress
- Virginie Gervais (born 1979), French model
- Virginie Greiner (born 1969), French comic book scriptwriter
- Virginie Hériot (1890–1932), French sailor
- Virginie Lagoutte-Clément (born 1979), French golfer
- Virginie Ledieu (born 1960), French voice actress
- Virginie Ledoyen (born 1976), French actress
- Virginie Loveling (1836–1923), Flemish author
- Virginie Pouchain (born 1980), French singer
- Virginie de Pusy Lafayette (born 1970), French aristocrat and clubwoman
- Virginie Razzano (born 1983), French tennis player
- Virginie Thévenet (born 1955), French actress
- Virginie Viard (born 1962), French fashion designer, creative director of Chanel
