= Action Party for Development =

Political party in the Central African Republic

The Action Party for Development (French: Parti d'action pour le développement, PAD) is a political party in the Central African Republic.

== History ==
Established in 1997, the party joined the National Convergence "Kwa Na Kwa" alliance for the 2005 general elections. The alliance won 42 seats, of which the PAD won two. Several Kwa Na Kwa factions merged into a single political party in August 2009, but the PAD remained a separate party.

In 2010 the party joined the Presidential Majority alliance in preparation for the 2011 general elections. The PAD nominated 19 candidates for the 105 seats in the National Assembly, winning three of the alliance's 11 seats.
