= National Union of Republican Democrats =

Political party in the Central African Republic

The National Union of Republican Democrats (French: Union nationale des démocrates républicains, UNADER) is a political party in the Central African Republic.

== History ==
Established in 2004 as the National Union for Democracy and Rally (French: Union Nationale pour la Démocratie et le Rassemblement, UNADER) the party joined the National Convergence "Kwa Na Kwa" alliance for the 2005 general elections. The alliance won 42 seats, of which UNADER won two.

Several Kwa Na Kwa factions merged into a single political party in August 2009, but UNADER remained a separate party. It contested the 2011 general elections, nominating eight candidates for the 105 seats in the National Assembly.
