= 2015 Central African constitutional referendum =

- 13–14 December 2015

Results
Choice	Votes	%
Yes	689,182	93.00%
No	51,874	7.00%
Valid votes	741,056	100.00%
Invalid or blank votes	0	0.00%
Total votes	741,056	100.00%
Registered voters/turnout	1,954,433	37.92%

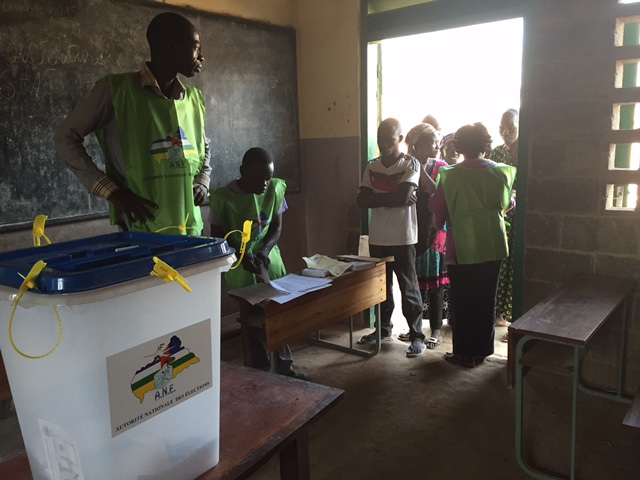
People voting in the Combattant district of Bangui

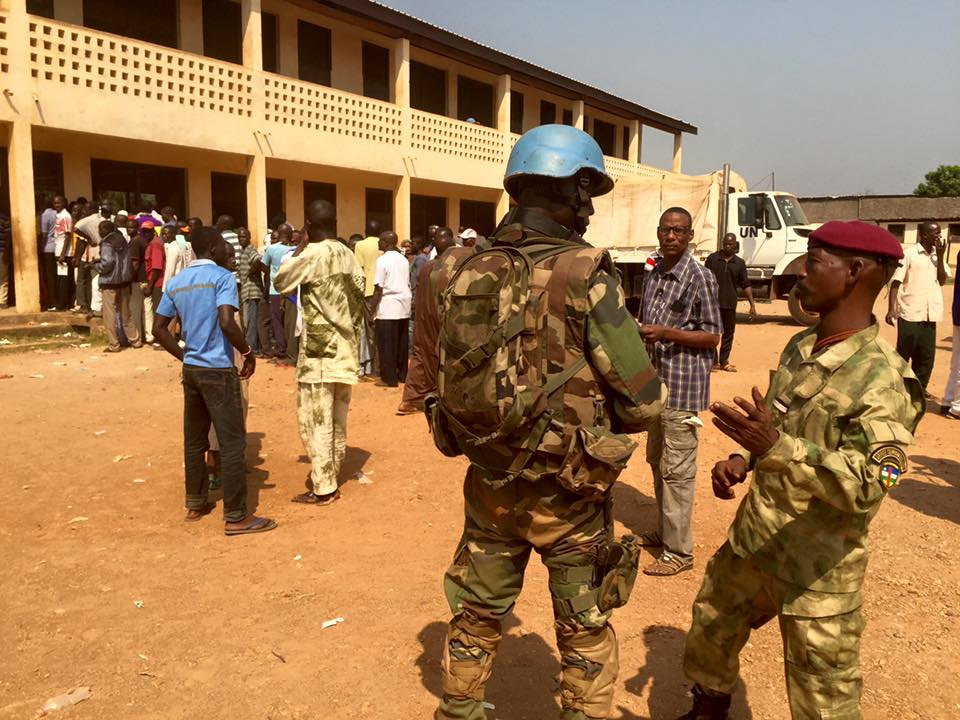
MINUSCA soldier deployed in the PK5 district of Bangui after gunfire broke out

A constitutional referendum was held in the Central African Republic on 13 and 14 December 2015. The referendum was originally scheduled to be held on 5 October 2015, prior to general elections, but was later delayed. Violence on polling day led to voting being extended for another day. The new constitution was approved by 93% of voters. General elections followed on 30 December.

== Background ==
The new constitution was approved by a large majority in the Transitional Council on 30 August 2015. It provides for the creation of a Senate and a National Election Authority, as well as requiring decisions made by the President and Prime Minister to be approved by ministers, and for the government to inform the National Assembly when a contract relating to mineral resources is signed. Only 15,000 copies of the new constitution were published.

== Results ==
Choice	Votes	%
For	689,182	93.00
Against	51,874	7.00
Invalid/blank votes		–
Total	741,056	100
Registered voters/turnout	1,954,433	
Source: Elections en République Centrafricaine
