= National Authority of Elections =

Central African Republic national electoral body

Autorité nationale des élections
Agency overview
- Formed: November 13, 2013; 12 years ago
- Jurisdiction: Central African Republic
- Status: Independent regulatory agency
- Headquarters: Bangui, Central African Republic
- Agency executive: Maître Mathias Barthélemy Morouba, President
- Website: ane-rca.org

The Autorité nationale des élections (ANE; English: National Authority for Elections) is the independent body responsible for organizing, supervising, and managing elections in the Central African Republic. It oversees presidential, legislative, and local elections, as well as voter registration and the publication of results.

== History and mandate ==
The ANE was established under the 2013 transitional charter and later reaffirmed by the 2016 Constitution of the Central African Republic to ensure the independence and transparency of the country’s electoral process. It functions as a permanent national institution charged with the preparation and conduct of all elections and referendums.

== Leadership ==
The current president of the ANE is Maître Mathias Barthélemy Morouba, appointed in 2024 for a seven-year term. The ANE includes several commissioners responsible for key areas such as electoral operations, logistics, civic education, finance, and legal affairs.

== See also ==
- Elections in the Central African Republic
- Politics of the Central African Republic
- Constitution of the Central African Republic
