= Désiré Kolingba =

Central African Republic politician (1956–2021)

Désiré Nzanga Bilal Kolingba (19 August 1956 – 25 April 2021) was a politician from the Central African Republic.

== Biography ==
Kolingba was elected to the National Assembly in 1998, representing Kembé. From January 2004 until January 2009, he served as Minister of Youth and Sports.

He stood for election when the country's interim President was elected by the interim parliament in January 2014, but was defeated in the second and final round of voting by 75 votes to 53, and Catherine Samba-Panza was elected.

Kolingba was born in Bangui, and his father André Kolingba was a previous president of the country.
