= Martin Ziguélé =

Central African politician

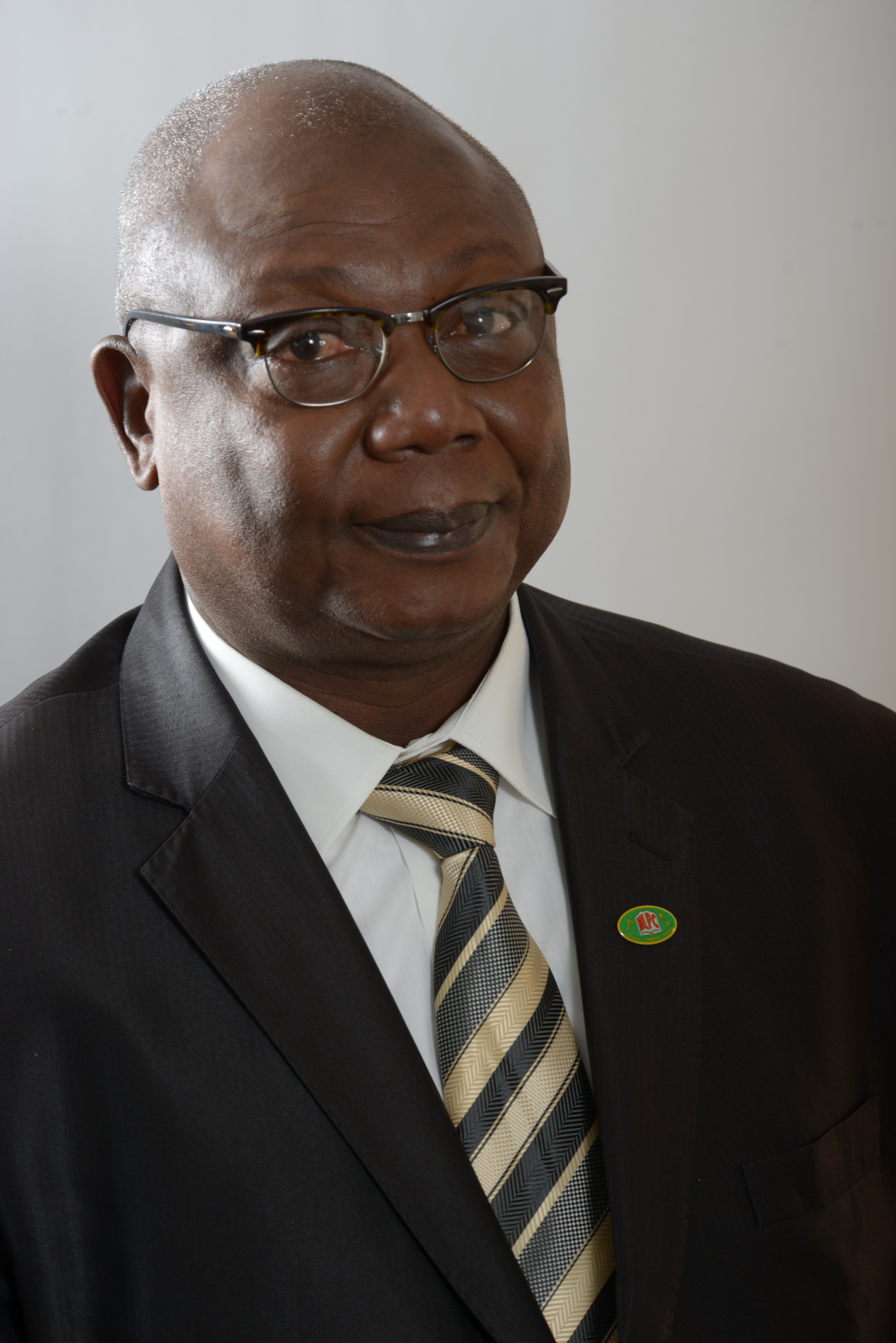
- Ziguélé in 2013

Prime Minister of the Central African Republic
- In office 1 April 2001 – 15 March 2003
- President: Ange-Félix Patassé
- Preceded by: Anicet Georges Dologuélé
- Succeeded by: Abel Goumba

Personal details
- Born: 12 February 1957 (age 69) Paoua, Ubangi-Shari, French Equatorial Africa (now Central African Republic) or Sangmelima, French Cameroon, French Equatorial Africa
- Party: MLPC
- Education: University of Bangui

Martin Ziguélé (born 12 February 1957) is a Central African politician who was Prime Minister of the Central African Republic from 2001 to 2003. He placed second in the 2005 presidential election and is currently the President of the Movement for the Liberation of the Central African People (MLPC).

== Early life and education ==
Ziguélé was born on 12 February 1957. His father worked as a soldier. He finished his primary education in Paoua in 1968. Afterward, he continued his education at Petit séminaire in Bossangoa and graduated in 1972. He then enrolled in Lycée des Rapides in Bangui and graduated in 1975. Subsequently, he studied at Institut international des assurances in Yaounde from 1976 to 1978. He also studied English literature at the University of Bangui and finished it in 1982.

== Career ==
=== Early career ===
Ziguélé began his career working at the Insurance Control Department of the Ministry of Finance in 1978. Afterward, he worked on various position at Entreprise d’état d’assurances et de réassurances in Bangui from 1988 to 1995. He then moved to Lomé to work at Compagnie commune de réassurance des états membres de la conférence internationale de contrôle d’assurance as head of division for non-African affairs for five years. In 2000, he returned to Bangui and became the director of the BEAC Bangui Branch.

=== Political career ===
In 1979, Ziguélé started his political career by joining MLPC.

Ziguélé was appointed as Prime Minister on 1 April 2001 by President Ange-Félix Patassé, replacing Anicet-Georges Dologuélé. He had previously lived in Lomé, Togo for twenty years and was an executive member of the MLPC. He also hold the portfolio of Minister of Finance. Ziguélé left office when rebel leader François Bozizé took power upon capturing the capital, Bangui, on 15 March 2003. Ziguélé was allowed to go into exile in France.

Ziguélé was initially barred from running in the 2005 presidential election, along with six other candidates, by a court ruling on December 30, 2004. He was subsequently reinstated as a candidate by Bozizé, along with two other candidates, on January 4. Later in January, all barred candidates, with the lone exception of Patassé, were allowed to run; following this, Patassé's party, the MLPC, backed Ziguélé for the election. Previously, he had been running as an independent. The election was held on March 13, 2005, and Ziguélé placed second with 23.5% of the votes according to official results. He faced Bozizé in a second round of voting, and tried to distance himself from Patassé in campaigning, but was defeated and took 35.4% of the vote.

Ziguélé was elected as President of the MLPC on a provisional basis for one year at an extraordinary party congress in late June 2006, while Patassé was suspended from the party. On June 23, 2007, at the end of the MLPC's third ordinary congress, Ziguélé was elected to a three-year term as President.

In the December 2015 presidential election, Ziguélé stood as the MLPC candidate and placed fourth. In the February–March 2016 parliamentary election, he was elected to the National Assembly as the MLPC candidate in the third constituency of Bocaranga, winning in the first round with 66.25%% of the vote.

In October 2021, The COD-2020 coalition, Crépin Mboli-Goumba’s Patrie party and Martin Ziguélé’s Central African People’s Liberation Movement withdrew their representatives from the organizing committee and denounced “a desire to sabotage the Dialogue”.

| Preceded by Anicet Georges Dologuélé | Prime Minister of the Central African Republic; 2001–2003 | Succeeded by Abel Goumba |
