= Ouango, Mbomou =

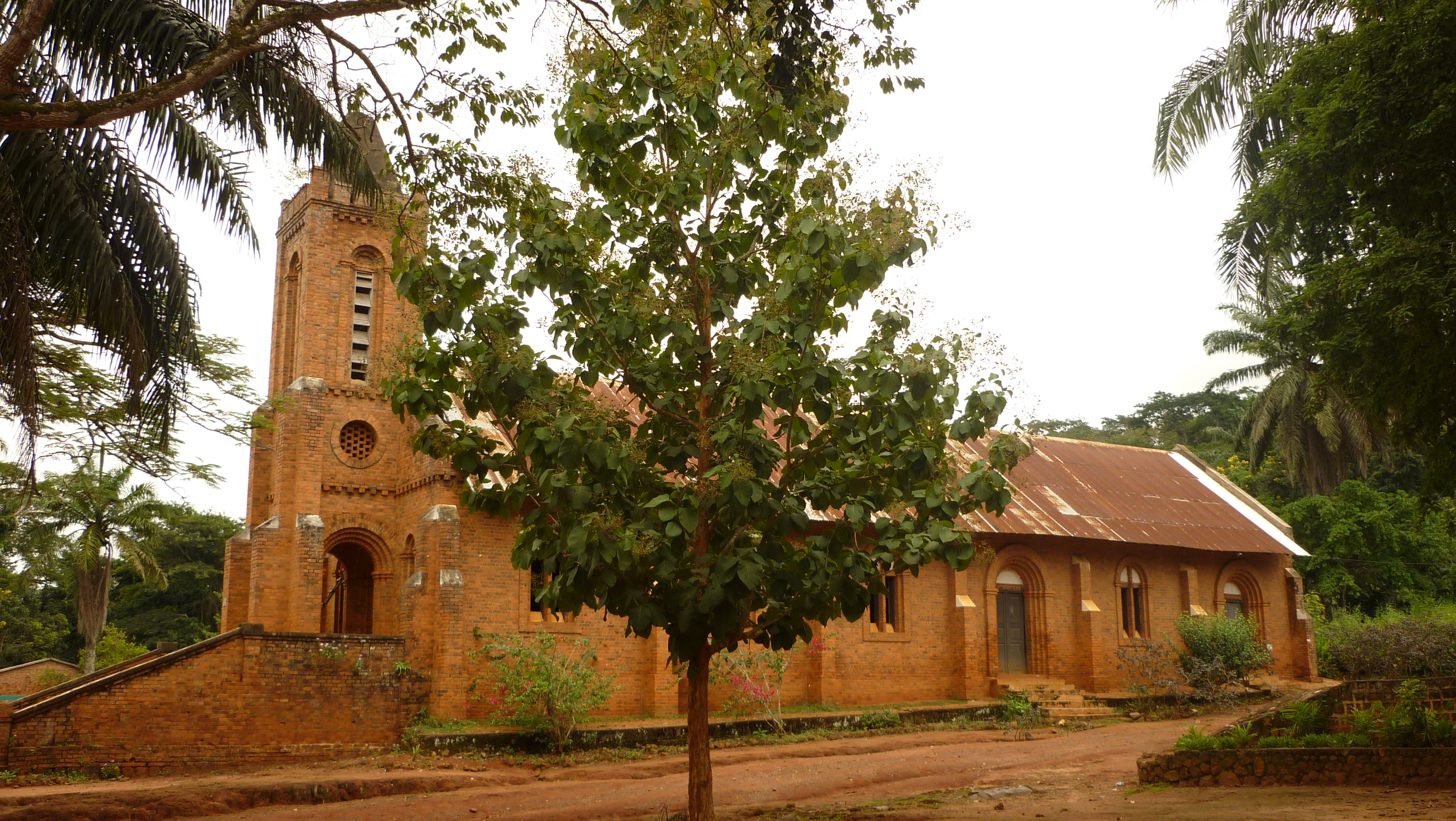

- Location in Central African Republic
- Coordinates: 4°19′N 22°33′E
- Country: Central African Republic
- Prefecture: Mbomou

Government
  - Sub-Prefect: Paul Gérard Rekouane

Ouango is a town located in the Central African Republic prefecture of Mbomou.
