= National Union for Democracy and Progress (Central African Republic) =

Political party in the Central African Republic

National Union for Democracy and Progress Union nationale pour la démocratie et le progrès
- President: Michel Amine
- Founded: 17 July 2014
- Headquarters: Bangui, Central African Republic
- Colors: Dark green, yellow
- Seats in the National Assembly: 13 / 100

The National Union for Democracy and Progress (French: Union nationale pour la démocratie et le progrès, UNDP) is a political party in the Central African Republic led by Michel Amine.

== History ==
The UNDP was launched in 2014, and officially recognised on 17 July. It did not nominate a presidential candidate in the 2015–16 general elections, but it emerged as the joint-largest party in the National Assembly, winning 13 of the 131 seats.
