= Anicet-Georges Dologuélé =

Central African politician (born 1957)

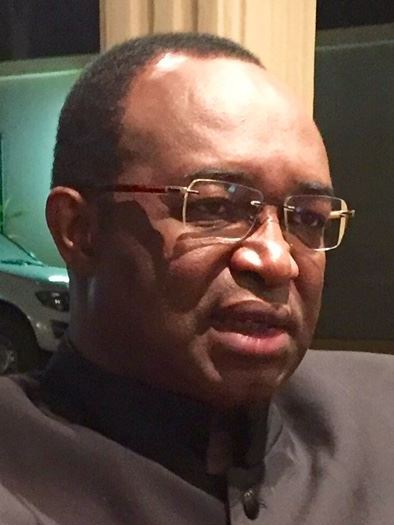
- Dologuélé in 2015

Prime Minister of the Central African Republic
- In office 4 January 1999 – 1 April 2001
- President: Ange-Félix Patassé
- Preceded by: Michel Gbezera-Bria
- Succeeded by: Martin Ziguélé

Personal details
- Born: 17 April 1957 (age 69) Bozoum, Ubangi-Shari (now Central African Republic)
- Party: Union for Central African Renewal (2013–present)
- Education: University of Bangui; University of Bordeaux

Anicet-Georges Dologuélé (French pronunciation: [anisɛʒɔʁʒ dologele]; born 17 April 1957) is a Central African politician who was Prime Minister of the Central African Republic from 4 January 1999 to 1 April 2001. Subsequently, he was President of the Development Bank of Central African States from 2001 to 2010. He ran in the 2025 presidential election, obtaining 14.66% of the vote against incumbent Faustin-Archange Touadéra.

== Life and career ==
Dologuélé was Minister of Finance and the Budget in the government of Prime Minister Michel Gbezera-Bria and subsequently served as Prime Minister from 1999 to 2001. As Prime Minister, Dologuélé, who not a member of the ruling Movement for the Liberation of the Central African People, faced hostility from the party; on 1 April 2001, he was dismissed by President Ange-Félix Patassé and replaced by Martin Ziguélé. Dologuélé criticized this decision as putting political considerations ahead of "good management".

Dologuélé was appointed to head the Development Bank of Central African States, remaining in that post for over eight years; he was eventually replaced by Mickaël Adandé from Gabon in January 2010.

In October 2013, Dologuélé founded a political party, the Union for Central African Renewal (URCA). He also planned to stand as a candidate in the next presidential election. As campaigning began for the election, which was eventually scheduled for 27 December 2015, Dologuélé presented himself as a candidate of peace and inclusion. He declared that he had "never held a weapon" and said that the ousted and exiled former President François Bozizé, who was barred from standing in the election, would be able to play some unspecified role in national affairs. Bozizé's Kwa Na Kwa party threw its support behind Dologuélé. While some thirty candidates stepped forward, only Dologuélé and Faustin-Archange Touadéra qualified for the runoff on 14 February 2016. He was beaten by Touadéra in the second round, by 62 percent to 37 percent. Although Dologuélé alleged fraud, he nevertheless stated that "for the sake of peace" he accepted the official results, would not appeal, and "recognize[d] Faustin-Archange Touadéra as the leader of all Central Africans".

In the February–March 2016 parliamentary election, Dologuélé was elected to the National Assembly as the URCA candidate in the first constituency of Bocaranga, winning in the second round with 75.33% of the vote.

In order to be able to run in the 2025 presidential election, Anicet-George Dologuélé renounced his French nationality in September 2025. He was nominated as URCA's presidential candidate on 8 October following an extraordinary party congress in Bangui. Later that month, his CAR passport was revoked, prompting him to file a complaint with the OHCHR.

Dologuélé, who won 14.66% of the vote, placed second in the presidential election and lost to the incumbent Touadéra. However, Dologuélé disputed the results, citing alleged malpractice by the National Authority of Elections and widespread electoral fraud and declared himself the winner on 2 January 2026. He then filed a protest before the Constitutional Court on 6 January. On 19 January, the Constitutional Court rejected Dologuélé's electoral protest and declared Touadéra as the winner in the presidential race, having won 77.9% of the vote, followed by Dologuélé with 13.1%.

== Notes ==
Political offices
Preceded by Michel Gbezera-Bria	Prime Minister of the Central African Republic; 1999–2001	Succeeded by Martin Ziguélé
