= Union for Central African Renewal =

Political party in the Central African Republic

Union for Central African Renewal Union pour le renouveau centrafricain
- Leader: Anicet-Georges Dologuélé
- Founded: 25 October 2013
- Headquarters: Bangui
- Ideology: Social liberalism
- Political position: Centre
- Colors: Navy blue, sky blue
- Seats in the National Assembly: 7 / 140

Website
- https://parti-urca.org

The Union for Central African Renewal (French: Union pour le renouveau centrafricain, URCA) is a political party in the Central African Republic led by Anicet-Georges Dologuélé.

== History ==
The URCA was established on 25 October 2013. Dologuélé was chosen as the party's candidate for the 2015–16 presidential elections; although he finished as the leading candidate in the first round, he was defeated by Faustin-Archange Touadéra in the run-off. In the parliamentary elections it emerged as the joint-largest party in the National Assembly, winning 13 of the 131 seats.

== Election results ==
=== Presidential elections ===
Election	Candidate	Votes	%	Votes	%	Result
Election	Candidate	First round		Second round		Result
2015	Anicet-Georges Dologuélé	268,952	23.7% (#1)	413,352	37.3% (#2)	Lost ✗
2020	Anicet-Georges Dologuélé	135,081	21.0% (#2)	—N/a		Lost ✗
2020–21	Anicet-Georges Dologuélé	130,017	21.7% (#2)	—N/a		Lost ✗
2025	Anicet-Georges Dologuélé	172,209	14.7% (#2)	—N/a		Lost ✗

=== Parliamentary elections ===
Election	Votes	%	Seats	+/–	Position	Government
2015–16			13 / 131	New	1st	Coalition
2020–21			7 / 140	▼6	▼3rd	
