= United Hearts Movement =

Political party in the Central African Republic

United Hearts Movement Mouvement cœurs unis
- President: Faustin-Archange Touadéra
- Founded: 8 November 2018
- Registered: 28 February 2019
- Headquarters: Bangui
- Ideology: Social democracy Russophilia
- Colors: Blue
- Seats in the National Assembly: 40 / 140

Website
- www.mcu-rca.org

The United Hearts Movement (French: Mouvement cœurs unis, MCU) is a political party in the Central African Republic and is led by Faustin-Archange Touadéra.

The party has been accused by Human Rights Watch of repressing the political opposition in the Central African Republic, attempting to use the powers of the state to prevent opposition candidates from contesting elections.

== History ==
The party was formed in November 2018 as a political association by President Faustin-Archange Touadéra, and officially took shape as a political party in early 2019. Touadéra ran under the MCU banner during the 2020–21 general election, which he won in the first round with 53.16% of the votes. Touadéra ran under the MCU once again during the 2025 general election, winning in the first round with 76.15% of the votes.

== Election results ==
=== Presidential elections ===
Election	Candidate	Votes	%	Votes	%	Result
Election	Candidate	First round		Second round		Result
2020–21	Faustin-Archange Touadéra	318,626	53.16% (#1)	—N/a		Elected ✓
2025	Faustin-Archange Touadéra	894,556	76.15% (#1)	—N/a		Elected ✓

=== Parliamentary elections ===
Election	Votes	%	Seats	+/–	Position	Government
2020–21			40 / 140	New	1st	Yes
