= Constitution of the Central African Republic =

Supreme law of the Central African Republic since 2016

The Constitution of the Central African Republic (French: Constitution de la République centrafricaine) was approved by referendum on December 15, 2015 and formally adopted on March 27, 2016. Since its independence in 1960, the Central African Republic has used many constitutions, showing a great political instability with several coups.

The constitutions used by the Central African Republic are:

- Constitution of November 26, 1964 (First Republic);
- Constitutional Act of January 8, 1966;
- Imperial Constitution of December 4, 1976 (Central African Empire);
- Constitutional Act of September 21, 1979 (Republic restored);
- Constitution of February 5, 1981 (Second Republic);
- Constitutional Act of September 1, 1981;
- Constitutional Act of 1985;
- Constitution of November 28, 1986 (Third Republic);
- Constitution of January 14, 1995 (Fourth Republic);
- Constitutional Act of March 15, 2003;
- Constitution of December 27, 2004 (Fifth Republic);
- Constitutional Charter of January 18, 2013 (transition);
- Constitution of December 14, 2015;
- Constitution of July 30, 2023.
