= Faustin-Archange Touadéra =

President of the Central African Republic since 2016

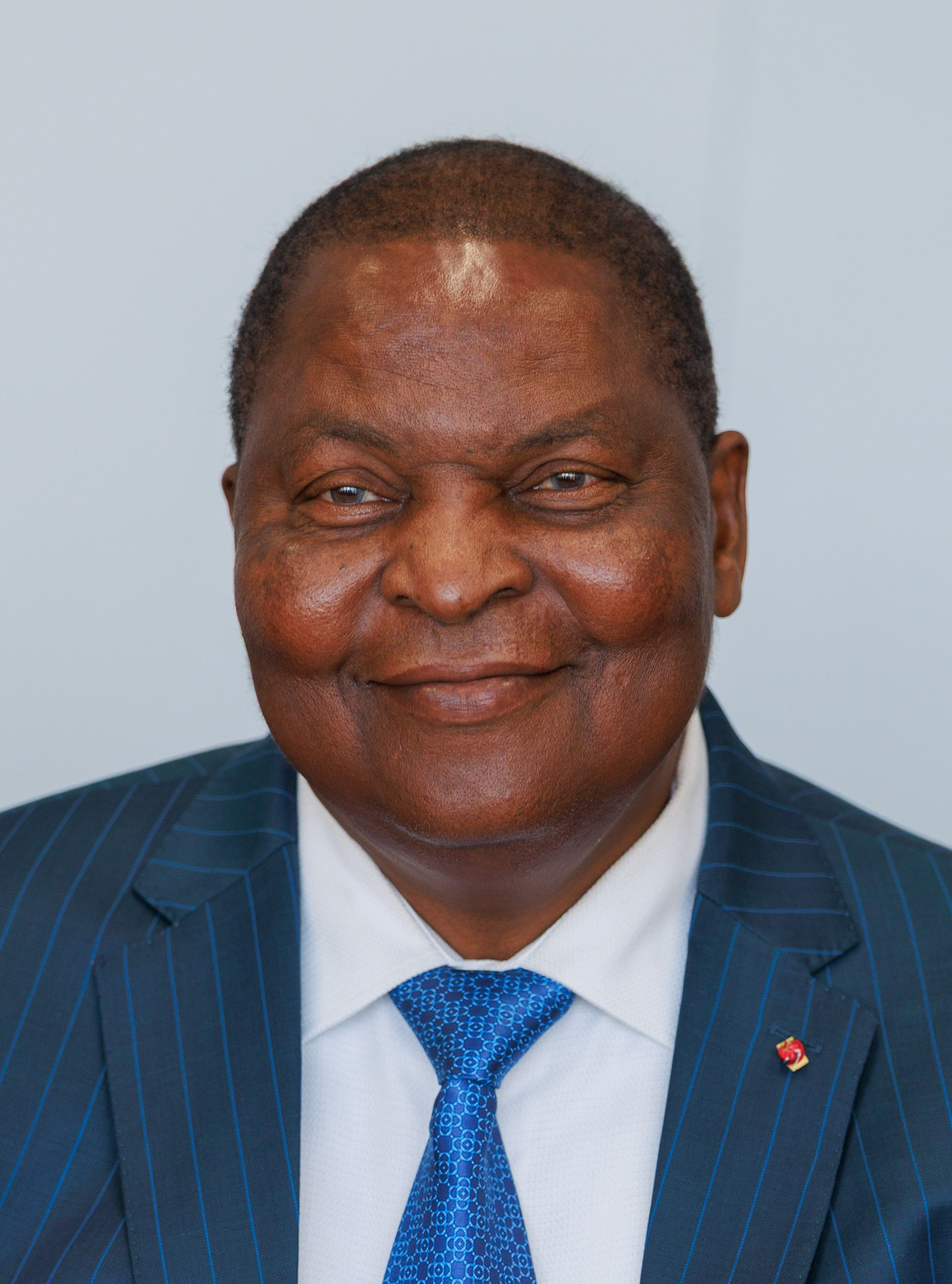
- Touadéra in 2025

8th President of the Central African Republic
- Incumbent
- Assumed office 30 March 2016
- Prime Minister: Simplice Sarandji; Firmin Ngrébada; Henri-Marie Dondra; Félix Moloua
- Preceded by: Catherine Samba-Panza

Prime Minister of the Central African Republic
- In office 22 January 2008 – 17 January 2013
- President: François Bozizé
- Preceded by: Élie Doté
- Succeeded by: Nicolas Tiangaye

Personal details
- Born: 21 April 1957 (age 69) Bangui, Ubangi-Shari (present-day Central African Republic)
- Party: United Hearts Movement (since 2019)
- Other political affiliations: Independent (2015–2019); Kwa na Kwa (before 2015)
- Spouse(s): Brigitte Touadéra; Tina Touadéra
- Children: 3
- Education: University of Bangui (BSc); University of Cocody (MSc); University of Lille (PhD); University of Yaoundé I (PhD)
- Website: Official website

Faustin-Archange Touadéra (French: [fostɛ̃ aʁkɑ̃ʒ twadeʁa]; born 21 April 1957) is a Central African politician and mathematician who has been president of the Central African Republic since March 2016, and was previously its prime minister from 2008 to 2013. He was elected to the presidency at the 2015–16 general election, in a second round of voting against former prime minister Anicet Georges Dologuélé. He was re-elected for a second term at the 2020–21 election and a third term at the 2025 Central African election, both of which took place amid low voter turnout and political violence.

Since at least 2023, Touadéra has been backed by the Wagner Group, a Russian state-sponsored private military company financing his elections and launching disinformation campaigns for him while intimidating his opponents. During his rule, which included the removal of term limits after the contested 2023 Central African constitutional referendum and the controversial 2025 general election, his government has repressed opposition in the country.

== Early life ==
Faustin-Archange Touadéra was born in Bangui (then in Ubangi-Shari and now in the Central African Republic) on 21 April 1957, the son of a driver and a farmer. His family was originally from Damara. He received his secondary education at the Barthelemy Boganda College in Bangui and obtained a baccalaureate in 1976, before attending the University of Bangui and the University of Abidjan. He earned a doctorate in mathematics in 1986, supervised by Daniel Gourdin at the Lille University of Science and Technology (Lille I) in France, and another doctorate, also in mathematics and supervised by Marcel Dossa, at the University of Yaoundé in Cameroon in 2004.

== Academic career ==
In 1987, Touadéra became assistant lecturer of mathematics at the University of Bangui and was vice-dean of the University's Faculty of Science from 1989 to 1992. In the latter year he became director of the teachers' training college. He joined the Inter-State Committee for the Standardisation of Mathematics Programs in the French-speaking countries and the Indian Ocean (CIEHPM) in 1999, serving as the president of the Committee from 2001 to 2003. He became vice chancellor of the University of Bangui in May 2004.

Touadéra subsequently served as rector of the university from 2005 to 2008, during which time he launched several key initiatives, such as the entrepreneurship training program and the creation of the Euclid Consortium.

== Prime minister ==
Touadéra was appointed prime minister by President François Bozizé on 22 January 2008, following the resignation of Élie Doté. His government, composed of 29 members—four ministers of state, 17 ministers, and seven minister delegates, along with himself—was appointed on 28 January. A national dialogue was held in December 2008, and François Bozizé then dissolved Touadéra's government on 18 January 2009 in preparation for the formation of a government of national unity.

Touadéra was reappointed prime minister on 19 January. Later on the same day, his new 31-minister government was appointed, with only 10 ministers retaining their posts; many former rebels were included in the new line-up to prepare the country for the 2009 local elections and the 2010 presidential and parliamentary polls.

Following a peace deal between the Bozizé government and the Séléka rebel coalition in January 2013, Bozizé dismissed Touadéra on 12 January 2013, in accordance with the terms of the agreement, which required that a new prime minister be appointed from the political opposition. Later, Touadéra announced his intention to stand as an independent candidate in the 2015–16 Central African general election.

=== EUCLID involvement and High Steward ===
In 2008, the Euclid Consortium initiative hosted by the University of Bangui led to the formation of an intergovernmental university named EUCLID (French: Pôle Universitaire Euclide). In his capacity as prime minister, Touadera signed the instrument of participation for the Central African Republic in May 2010. His chief of cabinet Simplice Sarandji also signed the headquarters agreement for EUCLID in March 2011. In April 2012, Touadera personally presided over a graduation ceremony in New York, at the Permanent Mission of the Central African Republic to the United Nations, for a graduating diplomat of Burundi. After his tenure as prime minister, Touadera became EUCLID's High Steward, an honorary role.

== President ==
=== Election ===
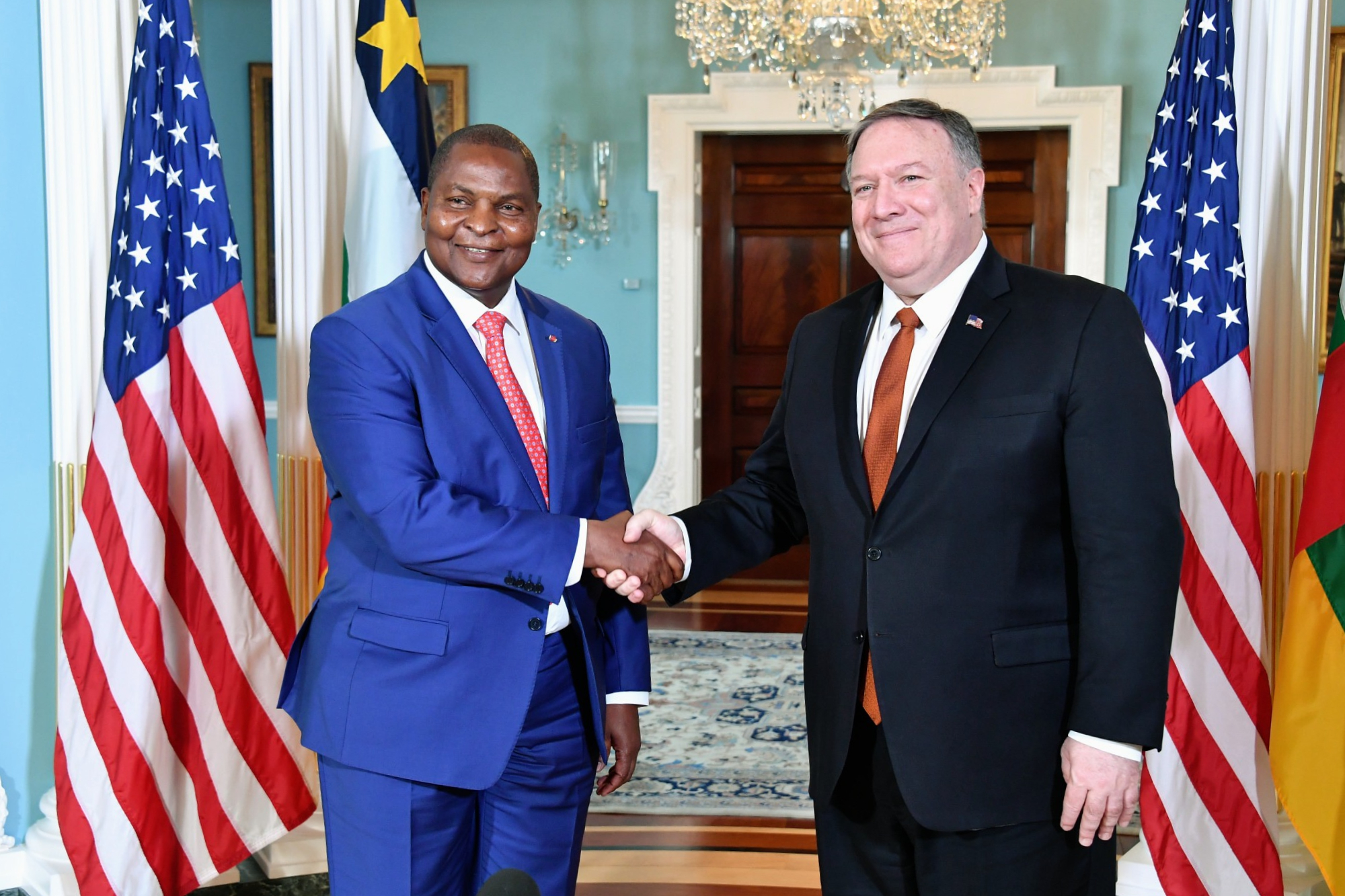
Touadéra with US secretary of state Mike Pompeo, 11 April 2019

Touadéra stood as a candidate in the December 2015–February 2016 presidential election. After finishing second in the first round of voting, he received the support of the majority of defeated candidates for the second round, which he won with 62% of the vote. He was sworn in on 30 March 2016. Speaking on the occasion, he vowed to pursue disarmament and "make CAR a united country, a country of peace, a country facing development". He appointed Simplice Sarandji as prime minister on 2 April 2016. Sarandji was Touadéra's campaign manager during the election and Touadéra's chief of staff during his own time as prime minister.

=== Tenure ===
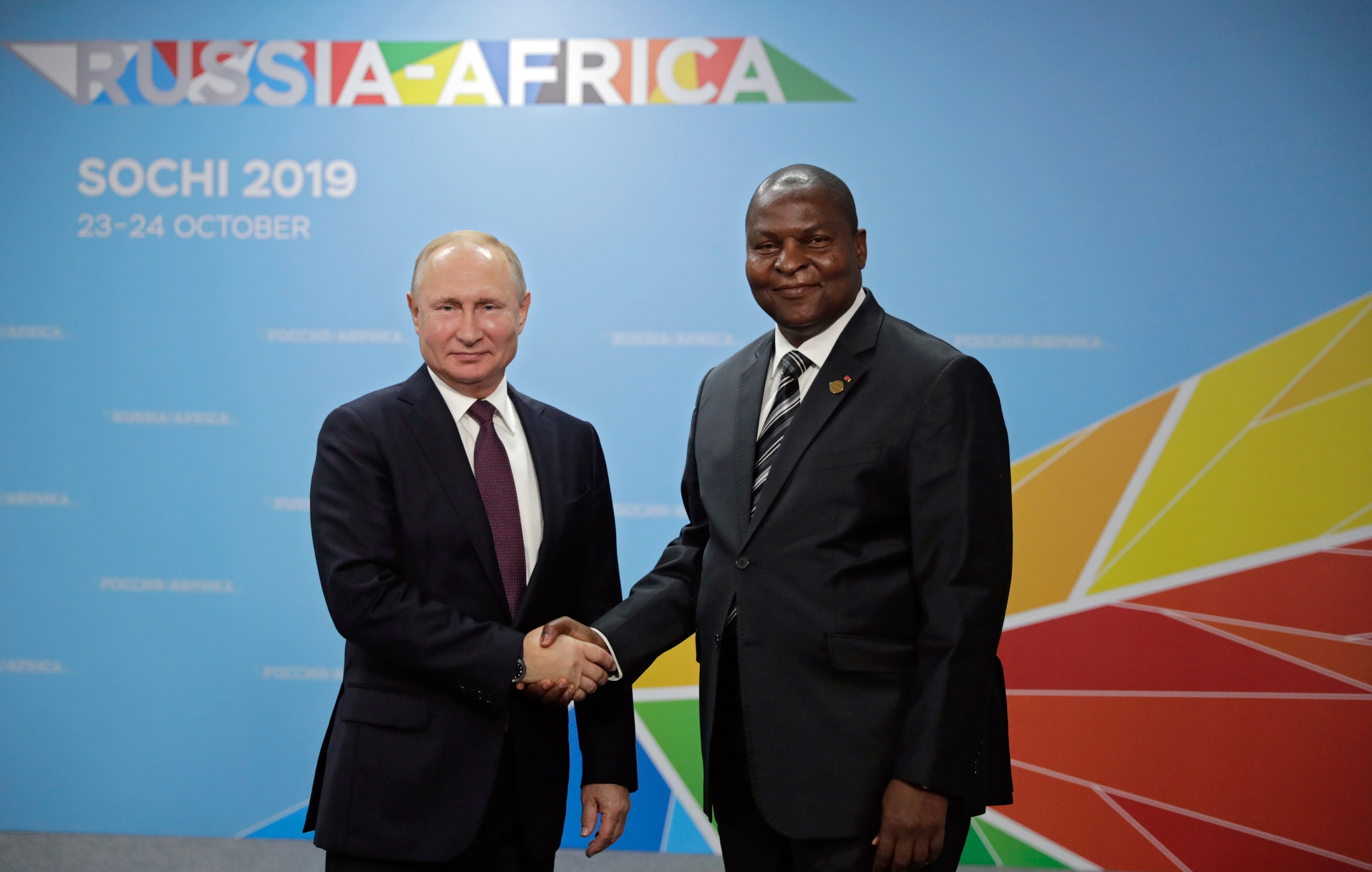
Touadéra with Russian President Vladimir Putin at the Russia–Africa Summit in Sochi on 23 October 2019

After Touadéra was sworn into office, France confirmed that it would end its military intervention in Central African Republic. France had around 2,500 troops deployed in the country as part of Operation Sangaris, supporting about 10,000 United Nations peacekeepers.

Without France's support, Touadéra faced the immediate challenge of maintaining security in major cities. The Central African Republic saw a 36 percent drop in its gross domestic product in 2013. The economy has slowly grown since then, but with the agricultural sector — the main contributor to GDP — still struggling, the government is struggling to raise revenue.

In April 2022, CAR approved a plan to make Bitcoin an official currency in the country. At the time, it was the second country to make the cryptocurrency legal tender joining El Salvador. The plan was abandoned in 2023. In December 2022, he attended the United States–Africa Leaders Summit 2022 and met with US president Joe Biden.

Touadéra's personal security detail is reportedly composed of members of the Russian Wagner Group. In July 2023, Touadéra attended the 2023 Russia–Africa Summit in Saint Petersburg and met Russian President Vladimir Putin. Touadéra expressed support for Russia, saying that Russia "had helped to save its democracy and prevent a civil war".

Touadéra with Italian Prime Minister Giorgia Meloni and President Sergio Mattarella at the 2024 Italy–Africa Summit in Rome, 28 January 2024

Also during the month, Touadéra called for a referendum to abolish term limits (at the time set to two five-year terms), while also increasing the length of the term to seven years. Without the change, Touadéra would have been term-limited and ineligible to stand at the next presidential election. In order to hold the referendum, Touadéra sacked the head of the constitutional court in October 2022, which had previously ruled the referendum (boycotted by the opposition) unconstitutional.

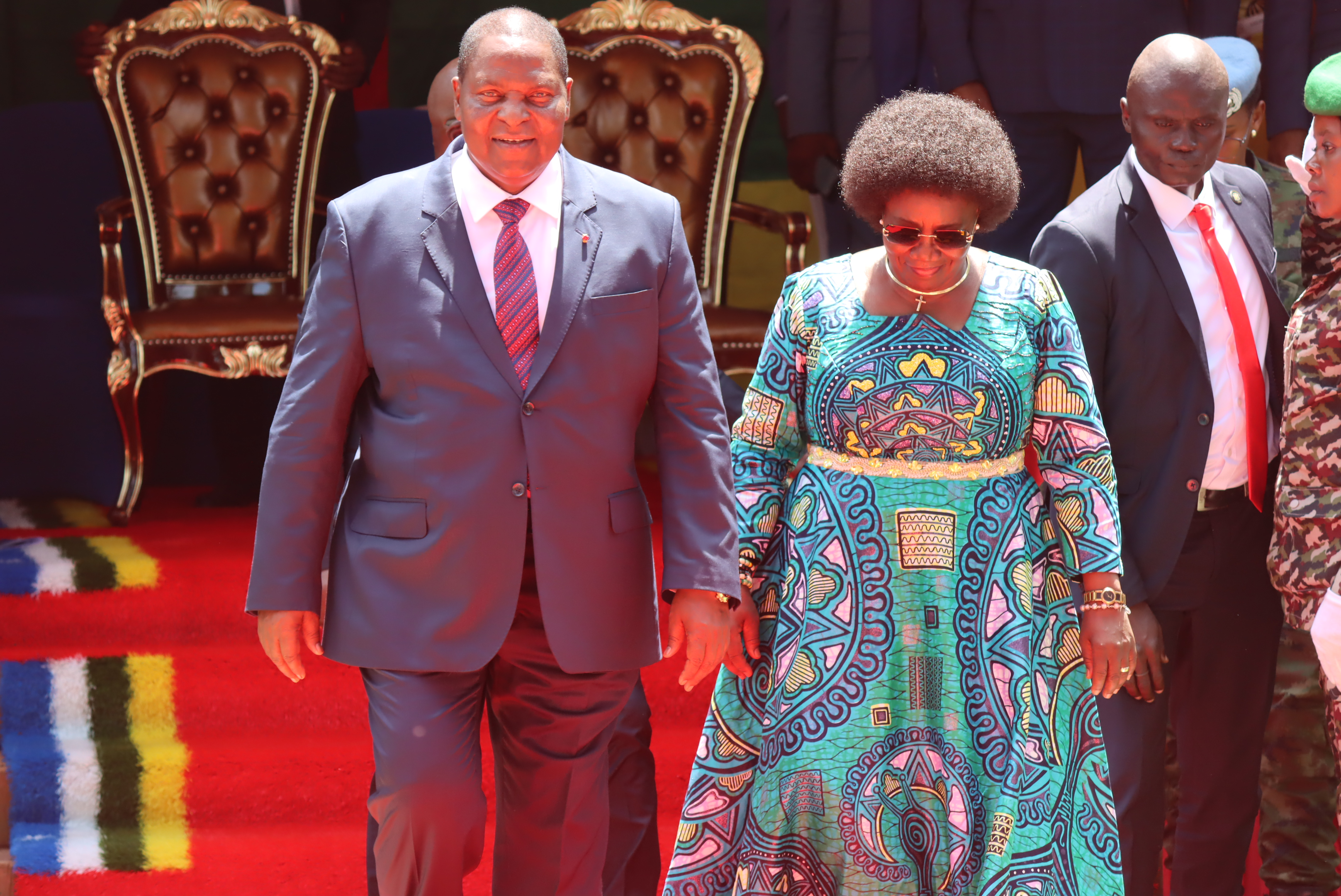
President Touadéra with one of his two wives, First Lady Brigitte Touadéra, at the 65th independence parade in 2025

In April 2024, Touadéra was received at the Elysée in France, for the second time since the start of his mandate in 2016, to sign a roadmap which will provide for the reestablishment of bilateral relations between the Central African Republic and France. In July 2025, he announced his reelection bid for president as the candidate of the United Hearts Movement in the 2025 Central African general election scheduled in December.

On 10 February 2025, Touadera announced the creation of $CAR as the country's official meme coin describing it as an experiment in national development. The coin briefly reached a US$900 million market cap before experiencing a significant price drop of over 90%. In November 2025, the Constitutional Court authorized him to seek another term, despite opposition parties claiming that he does not meet the criteria for another election. He subsequently won the election with around 76% of the vote.

Ahead of the 2025 general election, Touadéra repressed the political opposition in the Central African Republic, attempting to use the powers of the state to prevent opposition candidates from contesting in the election. Provisional results, which were announced on 6 January 2026, showed that he won re-election with 76% of the votes, with a reported turnout among registered voters was 52.42%. His opponents in the election disputed the results, citing alleged malpractice by the National Authority of Elections (ANE) and widespread electoral fraud. Anicet-Georges Dologuélé declared himself the winner of the election. On 19 January 2026, the Constitutional Court officially declared Touadéra as the winner in the presidential race, having won 77.9% of the vote, followed by Dologuélé with 13.1%.

== Personal life ==
Touadéra was a deacon in a Baptist church of the Fraternal Union of Baptist Churches, and is still a member of this union. He is polygynous and married to two wives, Brigitte Touadéra and Tina Marguerite Touadéra. Both Brigitte and Tina Touadéra have reportedly vied for the title and role of First Lady of the Central African Republic behind the scenes. Touadéra has three children.

Political offices
Preceded by Élie Doté	Prime Minister of the Central African Republic; 2008–2013	Succeeded by Nicolas Tiangaye
Preceded by Catherine Samba-Panza	President of the Central African Republic; 2016–present	Incumbent
