= National Assembly (Central African Republic) =

Legislative body

Coordinates: 4.3933°N 18.5629°E

National Assembly Assemblée nationale

Type
- Type: Unicameral

History
- Founded: December 12, 1960

Leadership
- President of the Assembly: Simplice Sarandji, MCU since 5 May 2021
- Vice Presidents: Arnaud Moanda; Ambroise Nyumba; Ernest Boteke; Antoinette Yambassa; Serge Mbengo, MCU since 5 May 2021
- Leader of Opposition: Adrien Zambila, URCA since 5 May 2021

Structure
- Seats: 140 members
- Political groups: MCU (50); PDSK (3); MOUNI (2); UNDP (1); CAN (1); PS (1); PAD (1); Independents (15)

Elections
- Last election: 28 December 2025

Meeting place
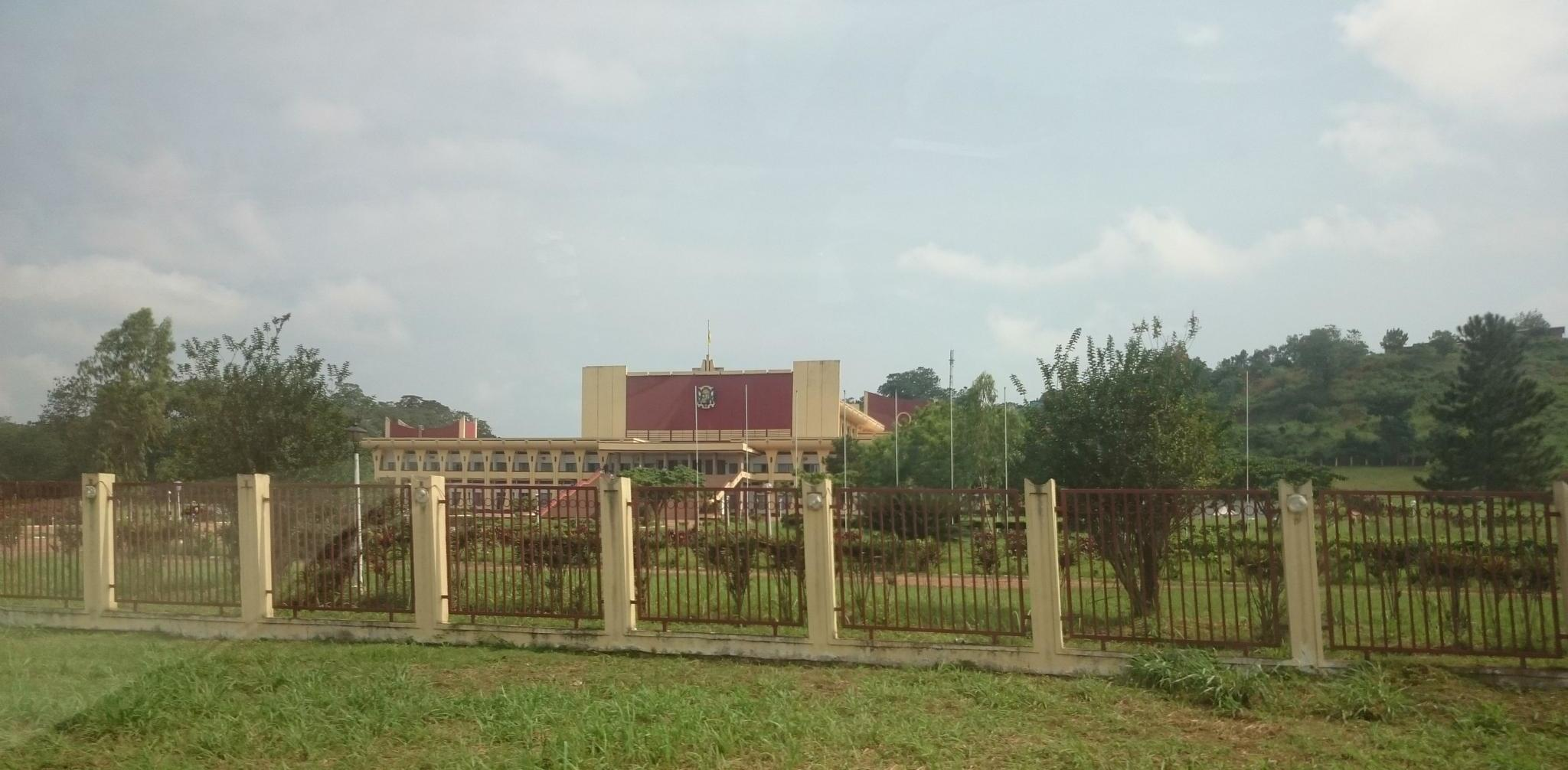
- Bangui

The National Assembly (French: Assemblée nationale) is the unicameral house of the Parliament of the Central African Republic. Members are elected in single-member constituencies using the two-round (or run-off) system. Members serve seven-year terms.

== Legislative history ==
The first legislative arm was established in January 1947, called Representative Council of Ubangi-Shari. It was replaced by the 50-member Territorial Assembly of Ubangi-Shari in April 1952. Constituent Legislative Assembly was established in December 1958. The 50-member Legislative Assembly of the CAR (Assemblée législative de la RCA) began its functions in February 1959. It was replaced by National Assembly on 12 December 1960.

Jean-Bédel Bokassa dissolved the National Assembly in 1966 and imprisoned a number of its deputies. The constitution of Central African Empire in 1976 outlined the National Assembly with elections planned in 1979, however, Bokassa was overthrown before the elections took place.

The legislature of the Central African Republic was previously (at least as of 1990) a bicameral institution known as Congress, of which the National Assembly was the lower house; the upper house was called the Economic and Regional Council (Conseil Economique et Regional).

In 2013, it was planned to dissolve the National Assembly by Jan 11, 2014 and hold new legislative elections, according to a ceasefire agreement signed between the government and the Seleka rebel coalition on Jan 11, 2013 in Libreville, Gabon. According to the agreement, a national unity government will be formed and a prime minister will be chosen from the opposition parties.

The National Assembly formed following elections held on 13 March and 8 May 2005, and had a total of 105 members.

The National Assembly is the lower house of the Parliament of the Central African Republic since the ratification of the Constitution of the Central African Republic on 27 March 2016.

The Senate was abolished upon the adoption of the 2023 constitution, and the National Assembly became the sole chamber of the unicameral legislature.

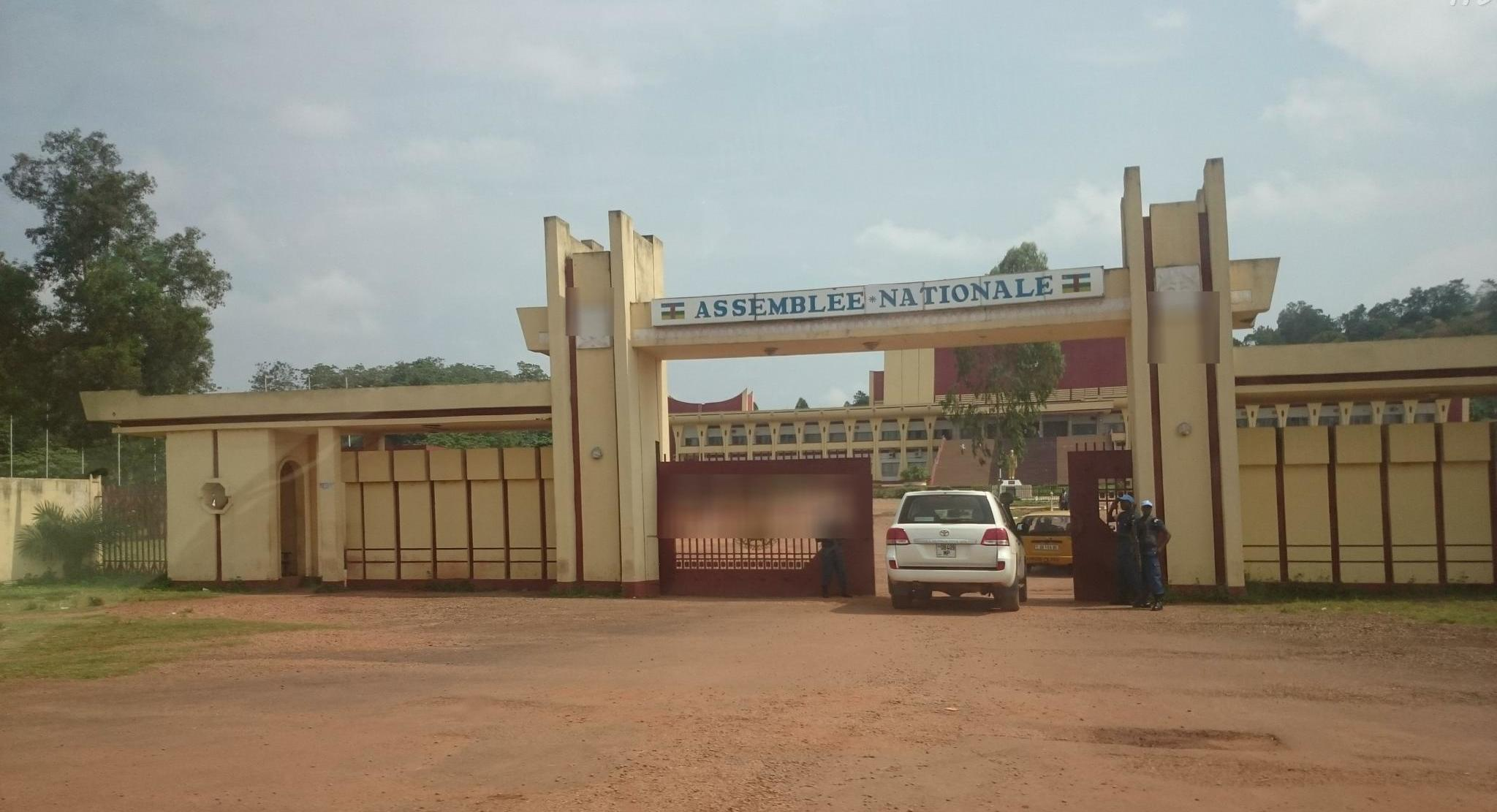
Entry to the National Assembly

== Composition ==
- United Hearts Movement (MCU) - 50
- Party for Democracy and Solidarity - Kélémba (PDSK) - 3
- National Movement of Independents (MOUNI) - 2
- National Union for Democracy and Progress - 1
- Centrafique Nouvel Élan (CAN) - 1
- Socialist Party (PS) - 1
- Action Party for Development (PAD) - 1
- Independents - 15

== See also ==
- History of the Central African Republic
- Politics of the Central African Republic
- List of national legislatures
- List of presidents of the National Assembly of the Central African Republic
