= Central African Republic Civil War =

Conflict in the Central African Republic since 2012

- Current military situation in Central African Republic as of 5 September 2025. (For a detailed map of the current military situation, see here.)
| Date | 10 December 2012 – present (13 years, 10 months, 2 weeks and 5 days) |
| Location | Central African Republic (with possible spillover into East Region, Cameroon, Democratic Republic of the Congo, Sudan, Chad, and South Sudan) |
| Status | Ongoing |

Belligerents
| Central African Republic; MINUSCA (since 2014); EUTM-RCA (since 2016) Rwanda (since 2020); Russia (since 2018); Wagner Group; Black Russians; Azande Ani Kpi Gbe; Africa Corps; Sudan (since 2023); Formerly: South Africa (2013); MISCA (2013–2014) MICOPAX (2008–2013): Angola; Cameroon; Chad; Morocco; Uganda; Congo-Brazzaville; DRC; Gabon; Burundi; Equatorial Guinea; São Tomé and Príncipe; France (2013–2021) EUFOR RCA (2014–2015): Estonia; Finland; Georgia; Latvia; Luxembourg; Netherlands; Portugal; Poland; Romania; Spain; Italy | Coalition of Patriots for Change (since 2020): Anti-balaka; FPRC; MPC elements (Note: Despite Mahamat al-Khatim's November 2023 announcement to leave CPC, some members of the group chose to stay in the coalition.); MPC; PRNC; CMSPR (since 2024) Support: Chad (alleged); RSF; Defunct groups: Séléka (2012–2014): CPJP; CPSK; UFDR; FDPC; FPR; RJ (2013–2018); MNLC (2017–2019); MLCJ (2008–2022); RPRC (2014–2022); UPC (2014–2025); 3R (2015–2025) |

Commanders and leaders
| Faustin-Archange Touadéra (since 2016); Félix Moloua (since 2022); Valentine Rugwabiza; Paul Kagame (since 2020); Édouard Ngirente (since 2020); Vladimir Putin (since 2018); Mikhail Mishustin (since 2020); Dmitry Medvedev (2018–2020) | François Bozizé (since 2020); Noureddine Adam (FPRC); Mahamat al-Khatim (MPC); Ali Darassa (surrendered) (UPC); Ramadhane Abdlekader (surrendered) (3R); Bernard Bonda (Anti-balaka); Igor Lamaka (Anti-balaka); See full list |

Strength
| 14,150 military and 1,000 paramilitary personnel (2025); 18,660 (May 2025); 1,500 mercenaries (2025); Black Russians: 3,000+; Formerly: 2,000; 200; ECCAS: 3,500+ peacekeepers | 20,000+ (CPC claim, 2022); 3,000 (Séléka claim, 2015); 1,000–2,000 (other estimates, 2014) |

Casualties and losses
| Unknown; 214 killed 15 soldiers killed 3 soldiers killed | Mid-2017–mid-2025: Many rebels killed/neutralized; 10,000+ rebels disarmed and demobilized; 3,320 weapons, 1,551 grenades/unexploded ordnance, 165,169 ammunition rounds, 153 mortar shells, and 327 rockets collected |
- Civilian casualties: Unknown number killed or wounded 200,000 internally displaced; 20,000 refugees (1 Aug 2013); 700,000 internally displaced; 288,000+ refugees (Feb 2014); Total: Thousands killed 13,594+ killed (Oct 2022)

The Central African Republic Civil War is an ongoing civil war in the Central African Republic (CAR) involving the successive governments, rebels from the former Séléka coalition, the Anti-balaka militias, and various foreign and international forces.

In the preceding Central African Bush War (2004–2007), the government of President François Bozizé fought with rebel groups until a peace agreement was signed in 2007. The current conflict began when a new coalition of rebel groups, known as Séléka, accused the government of failing to implement the peace agreements. The coalition captured several towns in 2012 before seizing the capital in 2013. Bozizé fled the country, and the rebel leader Michel Djotodia declared himself president. Renewed fighting began between Séléka and militias opposed to them called Anti-balaka. In September 2013, President Djotodia disbanded the Séléka coalition, which had lost its unity after taking power, and resigned in 2014. He was replaced by Catherine Samba-Panza, but the conflict continued. In July 2014, ex-Séléka factions and Anti-balaka representatives signed a ceasefire agreement. By the end of 2014, the country was de facto partitioned with the Anti-Balaka controlling the south and west, from which most Muslims had evacuated, and ex-Séléka groups controlling the north and east. Faustin-Archange Touadéra, who was elected president in 2016, ran and won the 2020 election, which triggered the main rebel factions to form an alliance opposed to the election called the Coalition of Patriots for Change, which was coordinated by former president Bozizé. Peacekeeping largely transitioned from the ECCAS-led MICOPAX to the African Union-led MISCA to the United Nations-led MINUSCA, while the French peacekeeping mission was known as Operation Sangaris. In July 2025, a peace agreement was achieved, in which 3R and UPC, the two largest remaining rebel groups, disarmed and dissolved in a public ceremony.

Much of the tension is over religious identity between Christian Anti-balaka and Muslim Séléka, and ethnic differences among ex-Séléka factions, and historical antagonism between agriculturalists, who largely comprise Anti-balaka, and nomadic groups, who constitute most Séléka fighters. Other contributing factors include the struggle for control of diamonds and other resources in the resource-rich country and for influence among regional powers such as Chad, Sudan and Rwanda and foreign powers such as France and Russia. More than 1.1 million people have fled their homes in a country of about 5 million people, the highest ever recorded in the country.

== Background ==
Map of Central African Republic Bush War

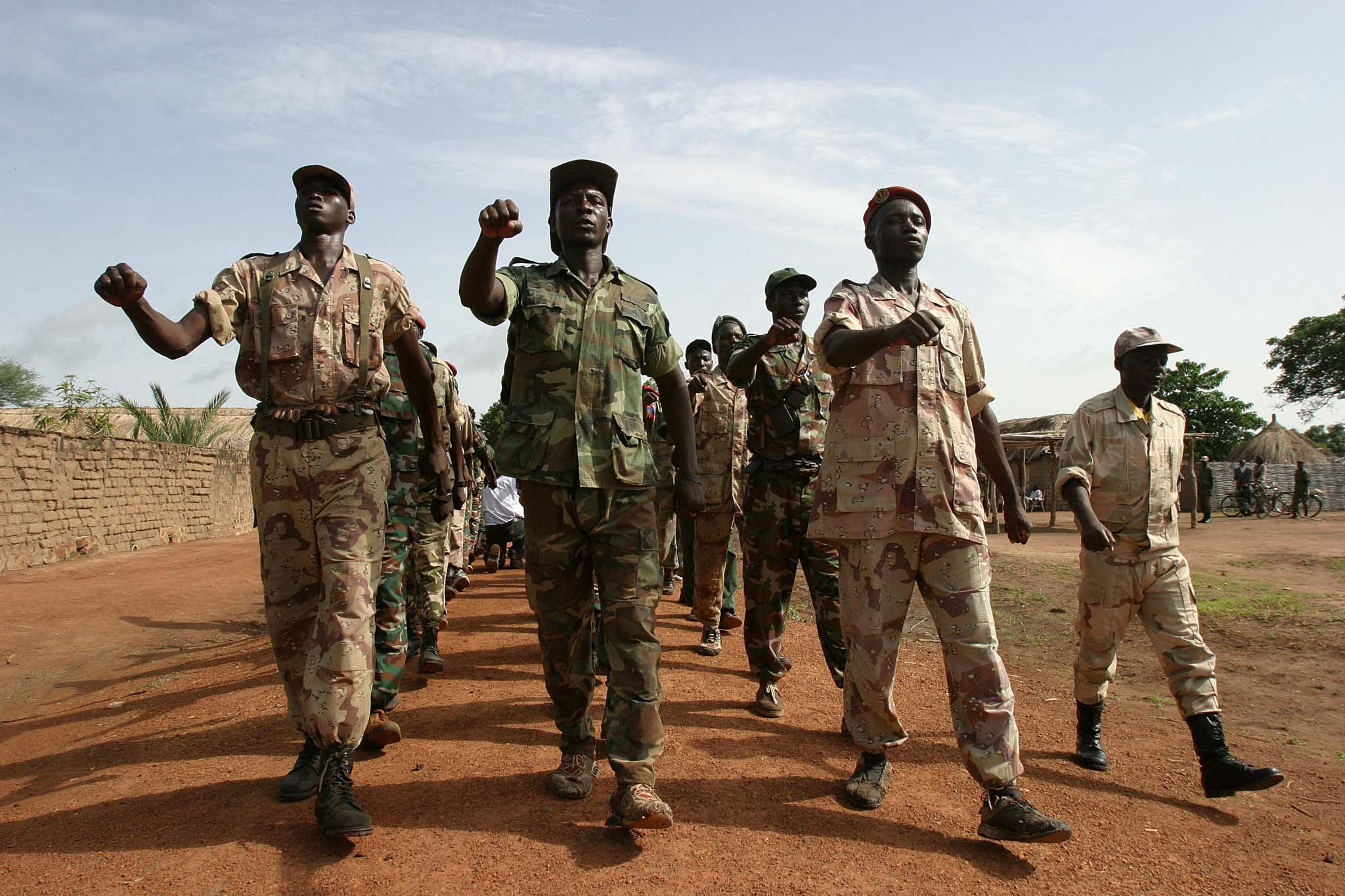
Rebels in northern Central African Republic in June 2007

The peacekeeping force Multinational Force in the Central African Republic (FOMUC) was formed in October 2002 by the regional economic community Economic and Monetary Community of Central Africa (CEMAC).

After François Bozizé seized power in 2003, the Central African Bush War (2004–2007) began with the rebellion by the Union of Democratic Forces for Unity (UFDR) in northeastern CAR, led by Michel Djotodia. During this conflict, the UFDR rebel forces also fought with several other rebel groups including the Group of Patriotic Action for the Liberation of Central Africa (GAPLC), the Convention of Patriots for Justice and Peace (CPJP), the People's Army for the Restoration of Democracy (APRD), the Movement of Central African Liberators for Justice (MLCJ), and the Democratic Front of the Central African People (FDPC). Tens of thousands of people were displaced by the unrest, which continued until 2007, with rebel forces seizing several cities during the conflict.

In 2008, the regional organization ECCAS (light and dark blue) formed MICOPAX, taking over peacekeeping from FOMUC, which was established by the economic community, CEMAC (light blue subset only).

On 13 April 2007, a peace agreement between the government and the UFDR was signed in Birao. The agreement provided for an amnesty for the UFDR, its recognition as a political party, and the integration of its fighters into the army. Further negotiations resulted in a Libreville Global Peace Accord agreement in 2008 for reconciliation, a unity government, local elections in 2009 and parliamentary and presidential elections in 2010. The new unity government that resulted was formed in January 2009. On 12 July 2008, with the waning of the Central African Bush War, the larger overlapping regional economic community to CEMAC called the Economic Community of Central African States (ECCAS), replaced FOMUC, whose mandate was largely restricted to security, with the Central African Peacebuilding Mission (MICOPAX), who had a broader peace building mandate.

Rebel groups alleged that Bozizé had not followed the terms of the 2007 agreement and that there continued to be political abuses, especially in the northern part of the country, such as "torture and illegal executions".

== Course of the conflict ==
Séléka advances in C.A.R. (December 2012 – March 2013)

=== Toppling Bozizé (2012–2013) ===
==== Formation of Séléka ====
In August 2012 a peace agreement was signed between the government and the CPJP. On 20 August 2012, an agreement was signed between a dissident faction of the CPJP, led by Colonel Hassan Al Habib calling itself Fundamental CPJP, and the Patriotic Convention for Saving the Country (CPSK). Al Habib announced that, in protest of the peace agreement, the Fundamental CPJP was launching an offensive dubbed "Operation Charles Massi", in memory of the CPJP founder who was allegedly tortured and murdered by the government, and that his group intended to overthrow Bozizé.

In September, Fundamental CPJP, using the French name Alliance CPSK-CPJP, took responsibility for attacks on the towns of Sibut, Damara and Dekoa, killing two members of the army. It claimed that it had killed two additional members of the Central African Armed Forces (FACA) in Damara, capturing military and civilian vehicles, weapons including rockets, and communications equipment, and launched unsuccessful assault on a fourth town, Grimari, and promised more operations in the future. Mahamath Isseine Abdoulaye, president of the pro-government CPJP faction, countered that the CPJP was committed to the peace agreement and the attacks were the work of Chadian rebels, saying this group of "thieves" would never be able to march on Bangui. Al Habib was killed by FACA on 19 September in Daya, a town north of Dekoa.

In November 2012, in Obo, FACA soldiers were injured in an attack attributed to Chadian Popular Front for Recovery rebels. On 10 December 2012, the rebels seized the towns of N'Délé, Sam Ouandja and Ouadda, as well as weapons left by fleeing soldiers. On 15 December, rebel forces took Bamingui, and three days later they advanced to Bria, moving closer to Bangui. The Alliance CPSK-CPJP for the first time used the name Séléka (meaning "union" in the Sango language) with a press release calling itself "Séléka CPSK-CPJP-UFDR", thus including the Union of Democratic Forces for Unity (UFDR). The Séléka claim they are fighting because of a lack of progress after a peace deal ended the Bush War. Following an appeal for help from Central African President François Bozizé, the President of Chad, Idriss Déby, pledged to send 2,000 troops to help quell the rebellion.

The first Chadian troops arrived on 18 December 2012 to reinforce the CAR contingent in Kaga-Bandoro, in preparation for a counter-attack on N'Délé. Séléka forces took Kabo on 19 December, a major hub for transport between Chad and CAR, located west and north of the areas previously taken by the rebels. On 18 December 2012, the Chadian group Popular Front for Recovery (FPR) announced their allegiance to the Séléka coalition. On 20 December 2012, a rebel group based in northern CAR, the Democratic Front of the Central African People (FDPC) joined the Séléka coalition. Four days later the rebel coalition took over Bambari, the country's third largest town, followed by Kaga-Bandoro on 25 December. Rebel forces reached Damara, bypassing the town of Sibut where around 150 Chadian troops were stationed together with CAR troops that withdrew from Kaga-Bandoro.

On 26 December, hundreds of protesters surrounded the French embassy accusing the former colonial power of failing to help the army. Josué Binoua, the CAR's minister for territorial administration, requested that France intervenes in case the rebels, now only 75 km (47 mi) away, manage to reach the capital Bangui. On 27 December, Bozizé asked the international community for assistance. French president François Hollande rejected the appeal, saying that French troops would only be used to protect French nationals in CAR, and not to defend Bozizé's government. Reports indicated that the U.S. military was preparing plans to evacuate "several hundred" American citizens, as well as other nationals. Gabonese General Jean-Félix Akaga, commander of the Economic Community of Central African States' (ECCAS) Multinational Force of Central Africa (FOMAC), said the capital was "fully secured" by the troops from its MICOPAX peacekeeping mission, adding that reinforcements should arrive soon. However, military sources in Gabon and Cameroon denied the report, claiming no decision had been taken regarding the crisis.

Government soldiers launched a counterattack against rebel forces in Bambari on 28 December, leading to heavy clashes, according to a government official. Several witnesses over 60 km (37 mi) away said they could hear detonations and heavy weapons fire for a number of hours. Later, both a rebel leader and a military source confirmed the military attack was repelled and the town remained under rebel control. At least one rebel fighter was killed and three were wounded in the clashes, and the military's casualties were unknown.

Meanwhile, the foreign ministers in the ECCAS announced that more troops from the Multinational Force for Central Africa (FOMAC) would be sent to the country to support the 560 members of the MICOPAX mission already present. The announcement was done by Chad's Foreign Minister Moussa Faki after a meeting in the Gabonese capital Libreville. At the same time, ECCAS Deputy Secretary-General Guy-Pierre Garcia confirmed that the rebels and the CAR government had agreed to unconditional talks, with the goal to get to negotiations by 10 January at the latest. In Bangui, the U.S. Air Force evacuated around 40 people from the country, including the American ambassador. The International Committee of the Red Cross also evacuated eight of its foreign workers, though local volunteers and 14 other foreigners remained to help the growing number of displaced people.

Rebel forces took over the town of Sibut without firing a shot on 29 December, as at least 60 vehicles with CAR and Chadian troops retreated to Damara, the last city standing between Séléka and the capital. In Bangui, the government ordered a 7 pm to 5 am curfew and banned the use of motorcycle taxis, fearing they could be used by rebels to infiltrate the city. Residents reported many shop-owners had hired groups of armed men to guard their property in anticipation of possible looting, as thousands were leaving the city in overloaded cars and boats. The French military contingent rose to 400 with the deployment of 150 additional paratroopers sent from Gabon to Bangui M'Poko International Airport. French prime minister Jean-Marc Ayrault again stressed that the troops were only present to "protect French and European nationals" and not deal with the rebels.

==== Foreign troops and ceasefire agreement ====
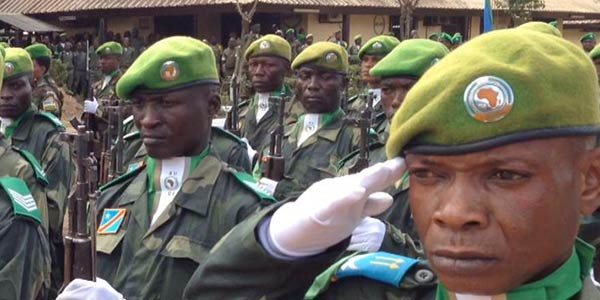
Peacekeepers from the Democratic Republic of the Congo in CAR, 2014

On 30 December, President Bozizé agreed to a possible national unity government with members of the Séléka coalition. On 2 January 2013, the president took over as the new head of the defense ministry from his son and dismissed army chief Guillaume Lapo. Meanwhile, rebel spokesman Col. Djouma Narkoyo confirmed that Séléka had stopped their advance and will enter peace talks due to start in Libreville on 8 January, on the precondition that government forces stop arresting members of the Gula tribe. The rebel coalition confirmed it would demand the immediate departure of President Bozizé, who had pledged to see out his term until its end in 2016. By 1 January reinforcements from FOMAC began to arrive in Damara to support the 400 Chadian troops already stationed there as part of the MICOPAX mission. With rebels closing in on the capital Bangui, a total of 360 soldiers were sent to boost the defenses of Damara – Angola, Democratic Republic of the Congo, 120 each from Gabon, Republic of the Congo and Cameroon, with a Gabonese general in command of the force.

Jean-Félix Akaga, the Gabonese general in charge of the MICOPAX force, sent by the ECCAS, declared that Damara represented a "red line that the rebels cannot cross", and that doing so would be "a declaration of war" against the 10 members of the regional bloc. France had further boosted its presence in the country to 600 troops. On 6 January, South African President Jacob Zuma announced the deployment of 400 troops to CAR to assist the forces already present there.

On 11 January 2013, a ceasefire agreement was signed in Libreville, Gabon. On 13 January, Bozizé signed a decree that removed Prime Minister Faustin-Archange Touadéra from power, as part of the agreement with the rebel coalition. The rebels dropped their demand for President François Bozizé to resign, but he had to appoint a new prime minister from the opposition by 18 January 2013. On 17 January, Nicolas Tiangaye was appointed prime minister. The terms of the agreement also included that National Assembly of the Central African Republic be dissolved within a week with a year-long coalition government formed in its place and a new legislative election be held within 12 months (with the possibility of postponement).

In addition, the temporary coalition government had to implement judicial reforms, amalgamate the rebel troops with the Bozizé government's troops to establish a new national military, set up the new legislative elections, as well as introduce other social and economic reforms. Furthermore, Bozizé's government was required to free all political prisoners imprisoned during the conflict, and foreign troops must return to their countries of origin. Under the agreement, Séléka rebels were not required to give up the cities they have taken or were then occupying, allegedly as a way to ensure that the Bozizé government would not renege on the agreement. Bozizé would be allowed to remain president until new presidential elections in 2016.

On 23 January 2013, the ceasefire was broken, with the government blaming Séléka and Séléka blaming the government for allegedly failing to honor the terms of the power-sharing agreement. By 21 March, the rebels had advanced to Bouca, 300 km from the capital Bangui. On 22 March, the fighting reached the town of Damara, 75 km from the capital.

==== Fall of Bangui ====
On 18 March 2013, the rebels, having taken over Gambo and Bangassou, threatened to take up arms again if their demands for the release of political prisoners, the integration of their forces into the national army and for South African soldiers to leave the country were not met within 72 hours. Three days later, they took control of the towns of Damara and Bossangoa. By 23 March, they entered Bangui. On 24 March, rebels reached the Presidential Palace in the centre of the capital. The Presidential Palace and the rest of the capital soon fell to rebel forces and Bozizé fled to the Democratic Republic of the Congo, which was followed by widespread looting in the capital. By 2 April, only 20 of the original 200 South African National Defence Force troops stationed in CAR remained in the country.

A company of French troops secured Bangui M'Poko International Airport and France sent 350 soldiers to ensure the security of its citizens, bringing the total number of French troops in CAR to nearly 600. On 25 March 2013, Séléka leader Michel Djotodia, who served after the January agreement as First Deputy Prime Minister for National Defense, declared himself president, becoming the first Muslim to ever hold the office. Djotodia said that there would be a three-year transitional period and that Nicolas Tiangaye would continue to serve as prime minister. Djotodia promptly suspended the constitution and dissolved the government, as well as the National Assembly. He then reappointed Tiangaye as prime minister on 27 March 2013.

=== Séléka rule and fall of Djotodia (2013–2014) ===
In the following two days top military and police officers met with Djotodia and recognized him as president on 28 March 2013, in what was viewed as "a form of surrender", and the overall security situation was beginning to improve. A new government headed by Tiangaye, with 34 members, appointed on 31 March 2013, included nine members of Séléka, along with eight representatives of the parties that had opposed Bozizé, while only one member of the government was associated with Bozizé, and 16 positions were given to representatives of civil society. The former opposition parties declared on 1 April that they would boycott the government to protest its domination by Séléka, arguing that the 16 positions given to representatives of civil society were in fact "handed over to Séléka allies disguised as civil society activists".

In late 2013, the peacekeeping mission transitioned from the ECCAS led MICOPAX to the larger African Union (flag above) led MISCA.

On 3 April 2013, African leaders meeting in Chad declared that they did not recognize Djotodia as president; instead, they proposed the formation of an inclusive transitional council and the holding of new elections in 18 months, rather than three years as envisioned by Djotodia. Speaking on 4 April, Information Minister Christophe Gazam Betty said that Djotodia had accepted the proposals of the African leaders; however, he suggested that Djotodia could remain in office if he were elected to head the transitional council. Djotodia accordingly signed a decree on 6 April for the formation of a transitional council that would act as a transitional parliament. The council was tasked with electing an interim president to serve during an 18-month transitional period leading to new elections.

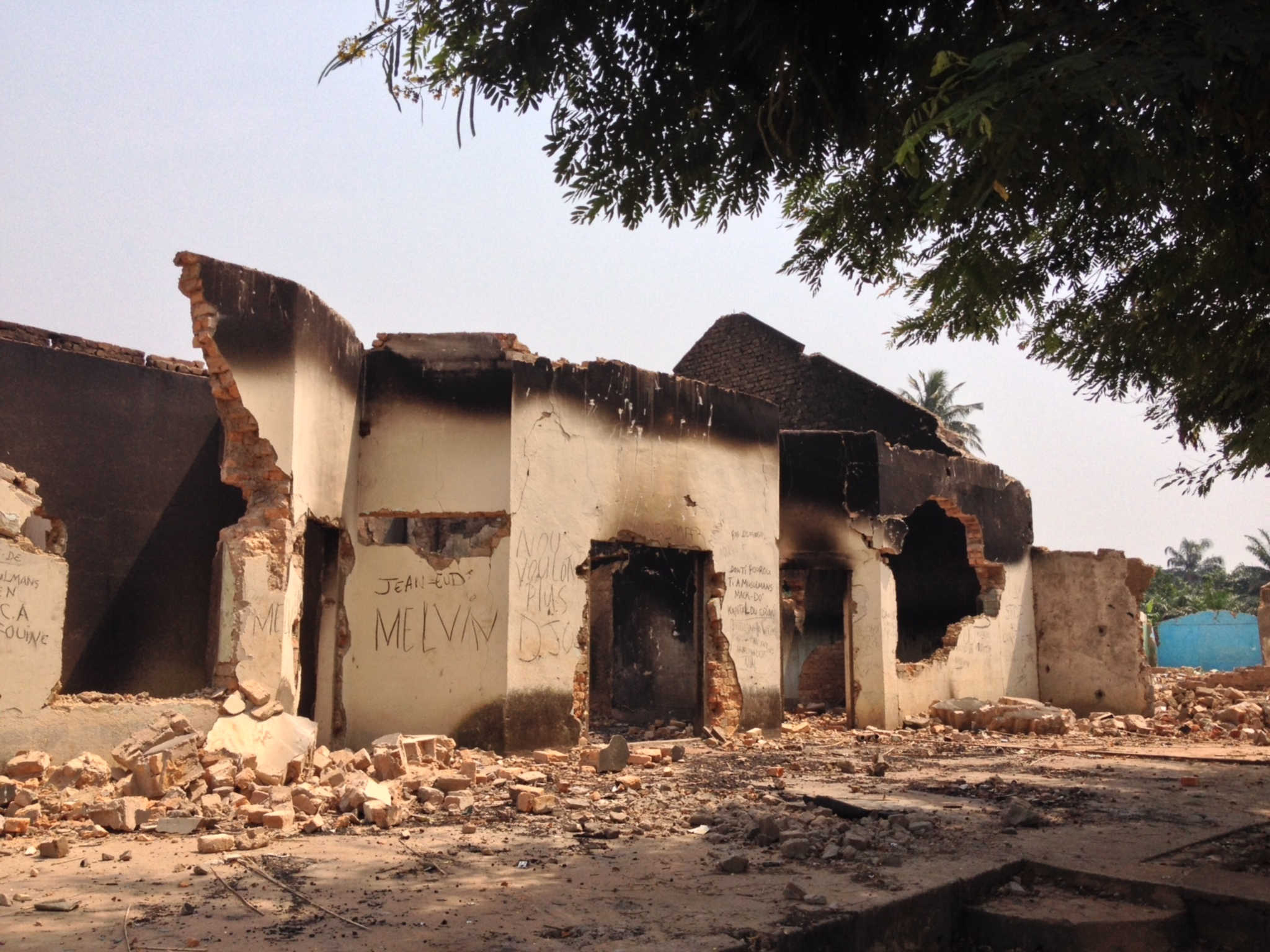
A mosque destroyed during a coordinated attack against Muslims, called the "Battle of Bangui"

The transitional council, composed of 105 members, met for the first time on 13 April 2013 and immediately elected Djotodia as interim president; there were no other candidates. A few days later, regional leaders publicly accepted Djotodia's transitional leadership, but, in a symbolic show of disapproval, stated that he would "not be called President of the Republic, but Head of State of the Transition". According to the plans for the transition, Djotodia would not stand as a candidate for president in the election that would conclude the transition.

On 13 September 2013, Djotodia formally disbanded Séléka, which he had lost effective control of once the coalition had taken power. This had little actual effect in stopping abuses by the militia soldiers who were now referred to as Ex-Séléka. Self-defense militias called Anti-balaka previously formed to fight crime on a local level, had organized into militias against abuses by Séléka soldiers. On 5 December 2013, called "A Day That Will Define Central African Republic", the Anti-balaka militias coordinated an attack on Bangui against its Muslim population, killing more than 1,000 civilians, in an unsuccessful attempt to overthrow Djotodia.

On 14 May, CAR's PM Nicolas Tiangaye requested a UN peacekeeping force from the UN Security Council, and on 31 May former president Bozizé was indicted for crimes against humanity and incitement of genocide. On the same day as the 5 December attacks, the UN Security Council authorized the transfer of MICOPAX to the African Union–led peacekeeping mission, the International Support Mission in the Central African Republic (MISCA or AFISM-CAR), with troop numbers increasing from 2,000 to 6,000; it also authorized the French peacekeeping mission called Operation Sangaris.

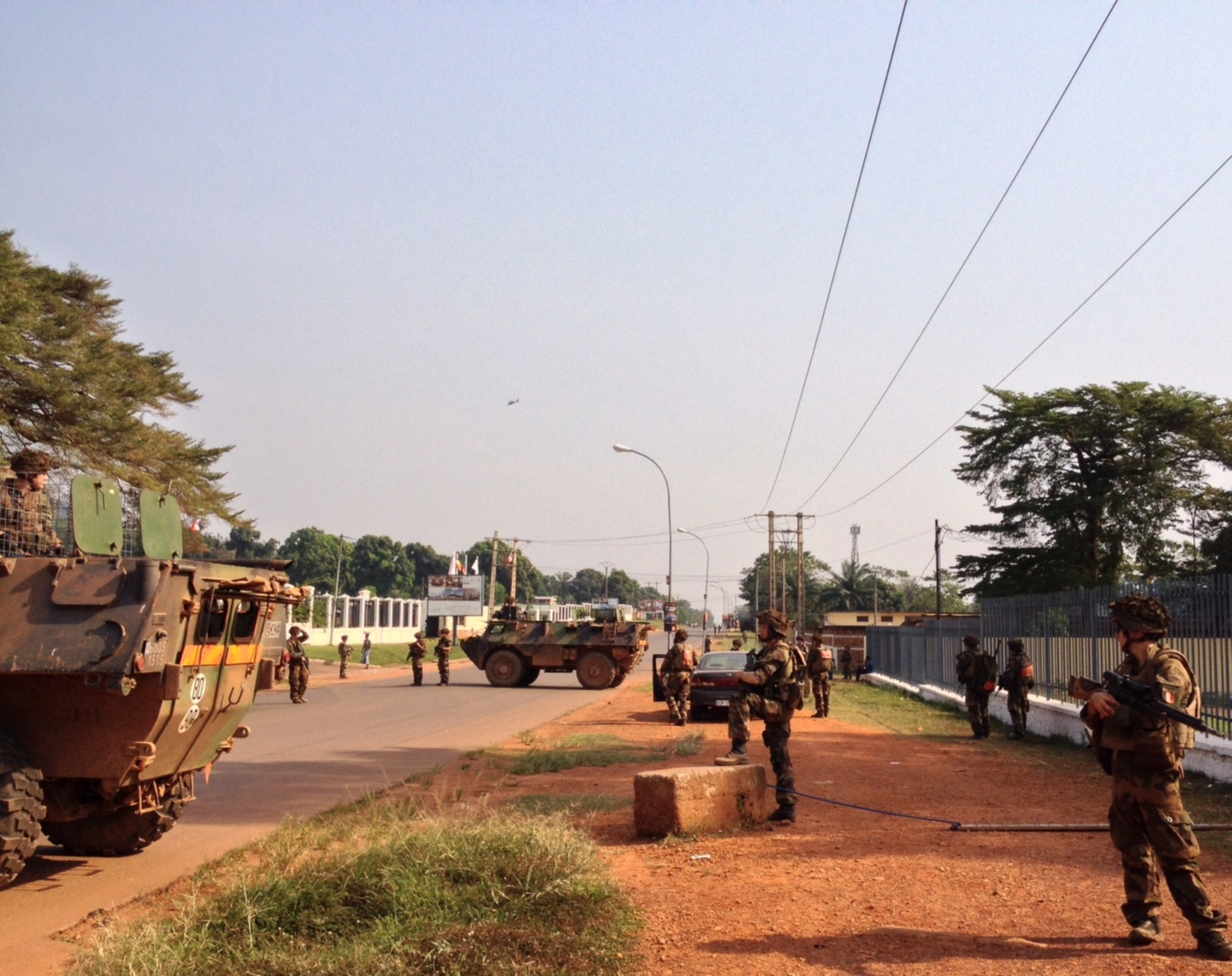
French soldiers as part of Operation Sangaris, authorized after communal violence in the capital in 2013

Interim president Michel Djotodia and Prime Minister Nicolas Tiangaye resigned on 10 January 2014 yet the conflict still continued. The National Transitional Council elected the new interim president of the Central African Republic after Alexandre-Ferdinand Nguendet became the Acting Chief of State. Nguendet, being the president of the provisional parliament and viewed as being close to Djotodia, did not run for the election under diplomatic pressure. On 20 January 2014, Catherine Samba-Panza, the mayor of Bangui, was elected as the interim president in the second round voting. Samba-Panza was viewed as having been neutral and away from clan clashes. Her arrival to the presidency was generally accepted by both the Ex-Séléka and the Anti-balaka sides. Following the election, Samba-Panza made a speech in the parliament appealing to the Ex-Séléka and the Anti-balaka for putting down their weapons.

=== Ex-Séléka and Anti-balaka fighting (2014–2020) ===
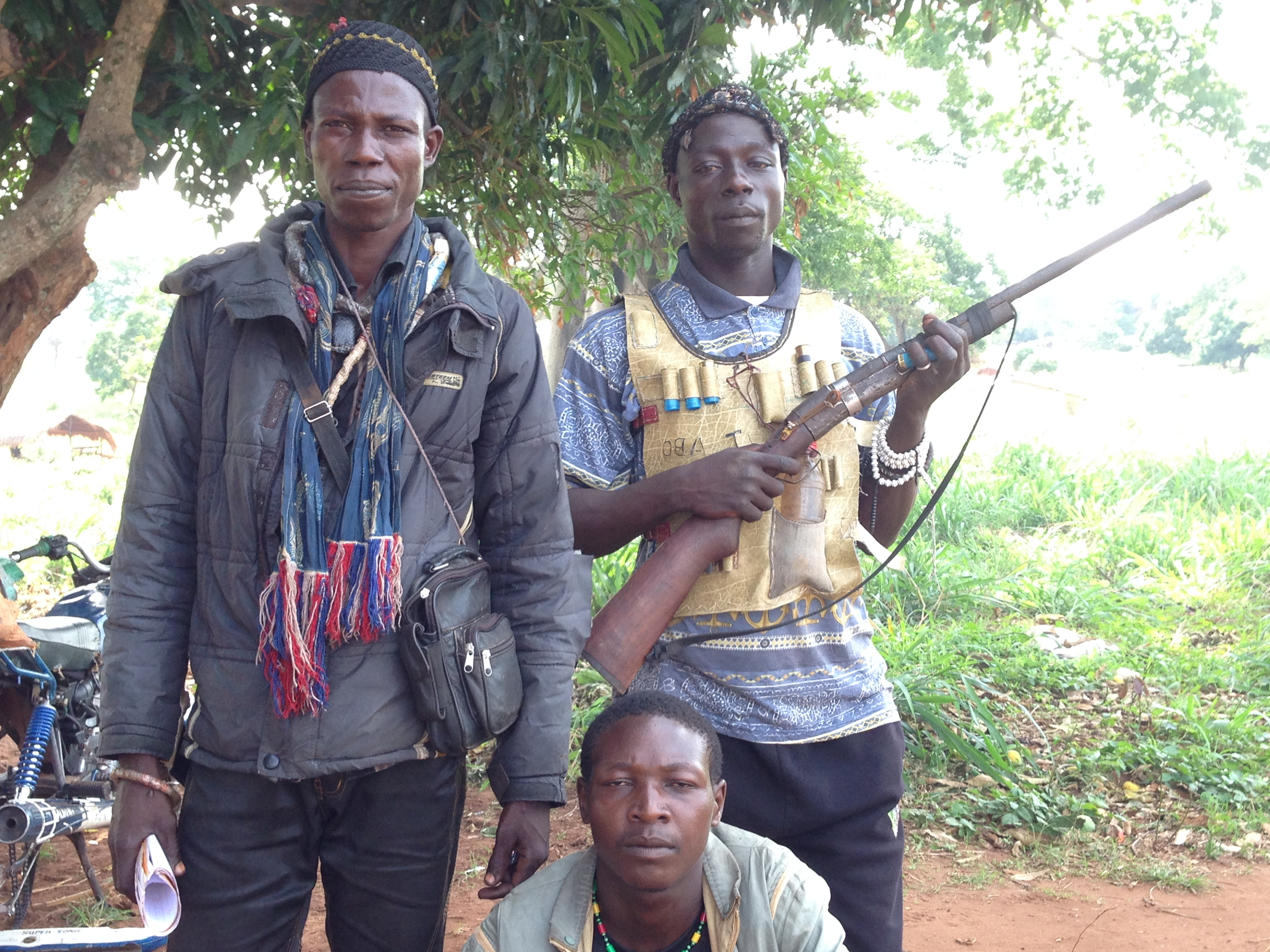
Militia groups called Anti-balaka formed to fight against Séléka and its succeeding rebel militias.

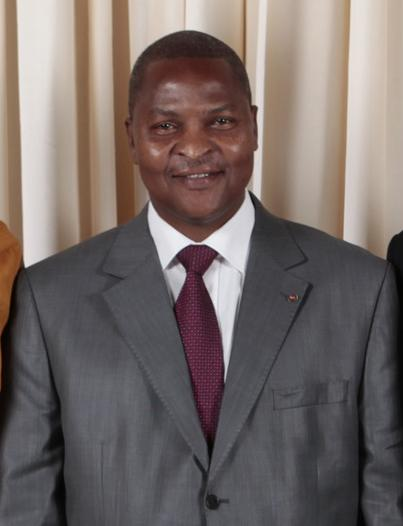
Faustin Touadéra succeeded interim head Catherine Samba-Panza to become president after the 2016 election.

In January 2014, Séléka leaders left Bangui under the escort of Chadian peacekeepers. The aftermath of Djotodia's presidency was said to lack law, a functioning police force, and courts leading to a wave of violence against Muslims. In February 2016, after a peaceful election, the former prime minister Faustin-Archange Touadéra was elected president. Since 2014, there has been little government control outside of the capital. Armed entrepreneurs have carved out personal fiefdoms in which they set up checkpoints, collect illegal taxes, and take in millions of dollars from the illicit coffee, mineral, and timber trades. At least 14 armed groups vied for territory, notably four factions formed by Ex-Séléka leaders who controlled about 60% of the country's territory. By October 2015, Samba-Panza accused the Nairobists of plotting a coup and dozens of FPRC combatants even walked from the north-east of the country to Sibut, a few kilometres from the capital, threatening the transitional authorities, but were stopped by international forces. With the de facto partition of the country between Ex-Séléka militias in the north and east and Anti-balaka militias in the south and west, hostilities between both sides decreased but sporadic fighting continued.

The European Union decided to set up its first military operations in six years when foreign ministers approved the sending of up to 1,000 soldiers to the country by the end of February, to be based around Bangui. Estonia promised to send soldiers, while Lithuania, Slovenia, Finland, Belgium, Poland and Sweden were considering sending troops; Germany, Italy and Great Britain announced that they would not send soldiers. The UN Security Council unanimously voted to approve sending European Union troops and to give them a mandate to use force, as well as threatening sanctions against those responsible for the violence. The E.U. had pledged 500 troops to aid African and French troops already in the country. Specifically the resolution allowed for the use of "all necessary measures" to protect civilians. The first batch of 55 EUFOR troops arrived in Bangui, according to the French army, and carried out its first patrol on 9 April with the intention of "maintaining security and training local officers". On 15 February, France announced that it would send an additional 400 troops to the country. French president François Hollande's office called for "increased solidarity" with the CAR and for the United Nations Security Council to accelerate the deployment of peacekeeping troops to the CAR.

Ban Ki-moon then also called for the rapid deployment of 3,000 additional international peacekeepers. Because of increasing violence, on 10 April 2014, the UN Security Council transferred MISCA to a UN peacekeeping operation called the Multidimensional Integrated Stabilization Mission in the Central African Republic (MINUSCA) with 10,000 troops, to be deployed in September that year. MINUSCA drew figurative "red lines" on the roads to keep the peace among rival militias. France called for a vote at the UNSC in April 2014 and expected a unanimous resolution authorising 10,000 troops and 1,800 police to replace the over 5,000 African Union soldiers on 15 September; the motion was then approved. After an incident where civilians were killed that involved Chadian soldiers, Chad announced the withdrawal of its forces from MISCA in April 2014. In October 2016, France announced that it was ending its peacekeeping mission in the country, Operation Sangaris, and largely withdrew its troops, saying that the operation was a success.

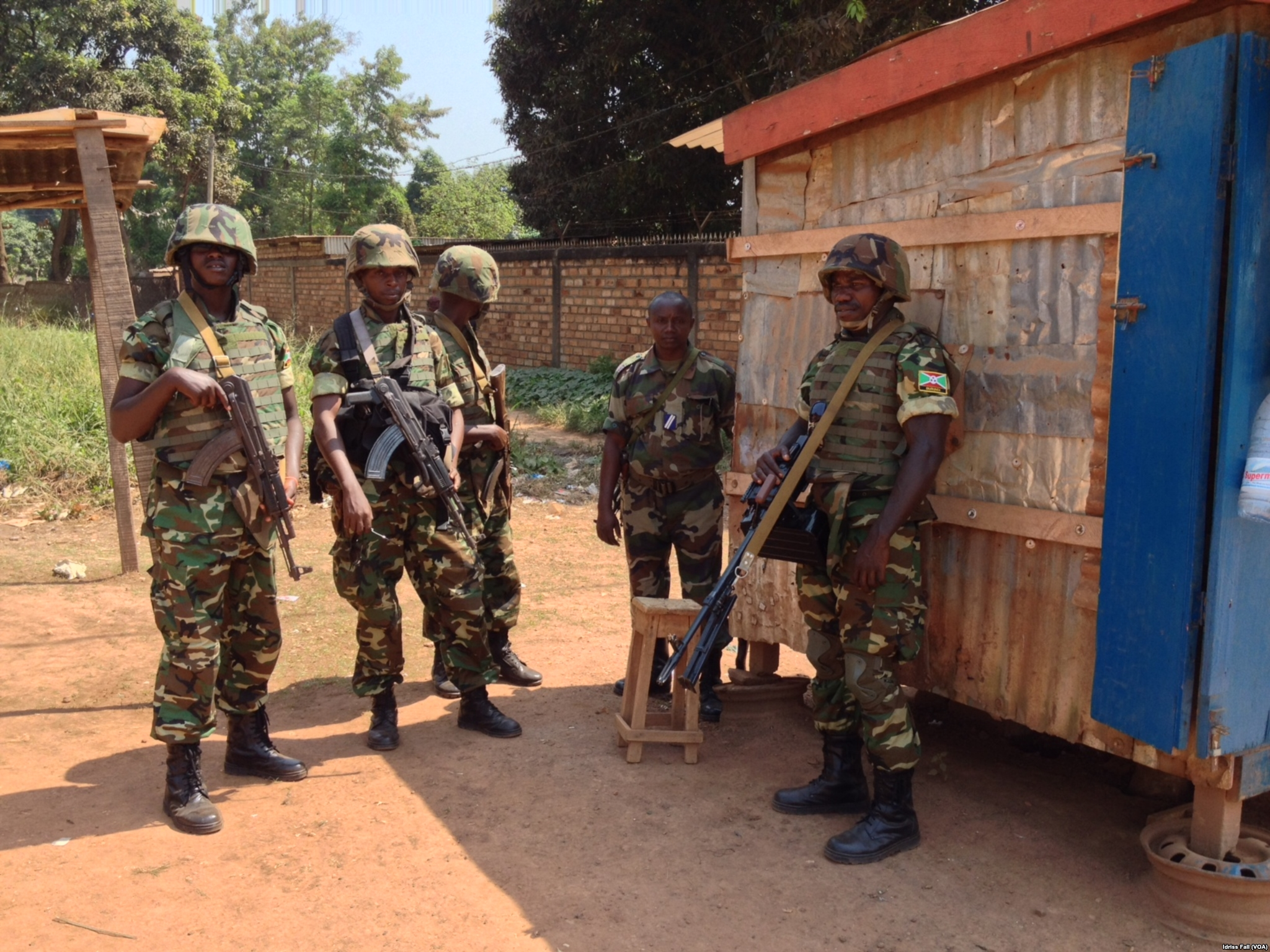
Burundian peacekeepers in Bangui

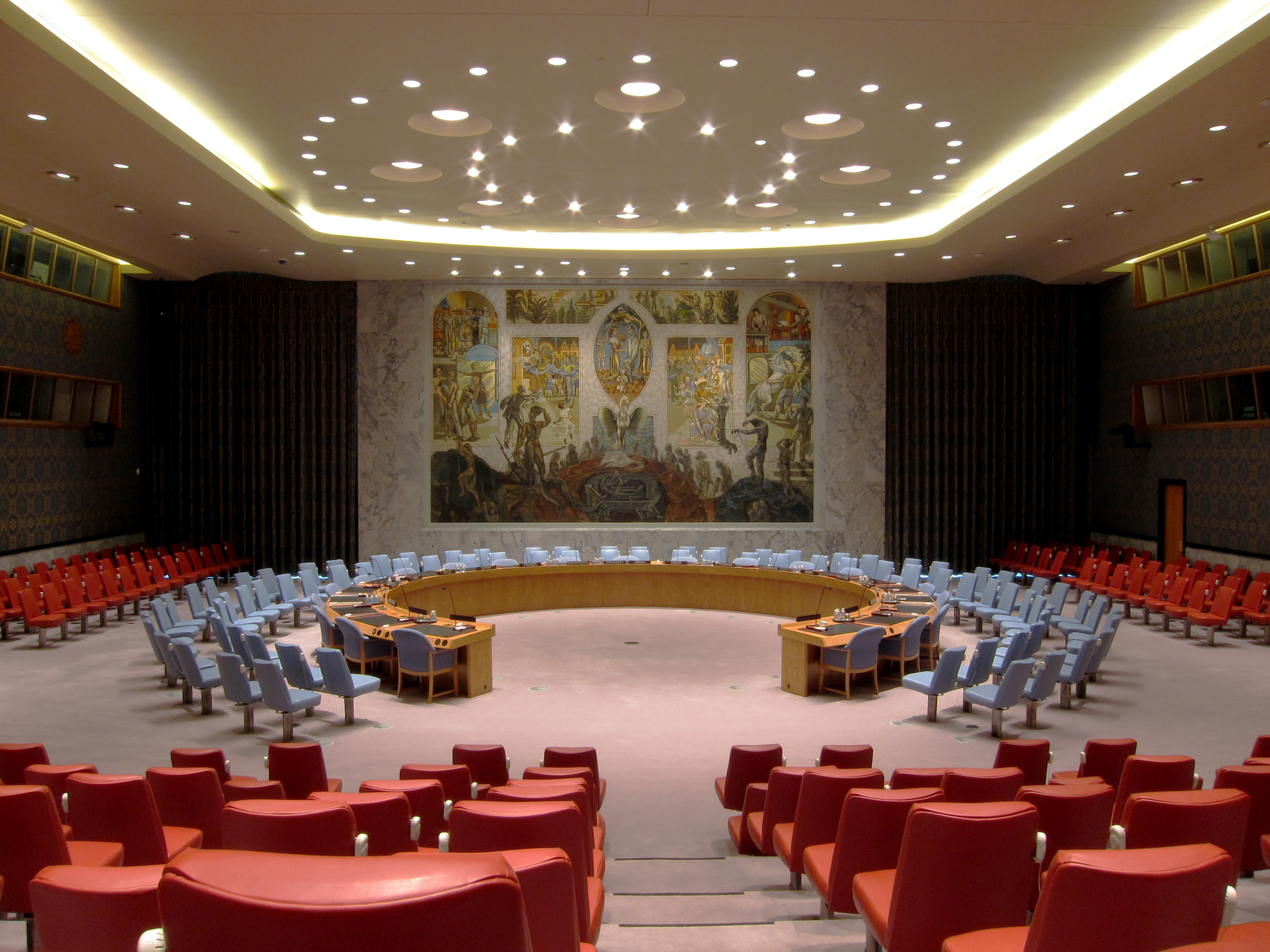
The United Nations Security Council authorized the transition of peacekeeping from the African Union led MISCA to a United Nations peacekeeping mission called MINUSCA in 2014.

A ceasefire was signed on 24 July 2014 in Brazzaville, between Ex-Séléka, represented by General Mohamed Moussa Dhaffane, and the Anti-balaka, represented by Patrick Edouard Ngaïssona. The Séléka delegation had pushed for a formalization of the partition of the Central African Republic with Muslims in the north and Christians in the south but dropped that demand in talks. Many factions on the ground claimed the talks were not representative and fighting continued with Séléka's military leader Joseph Zoundeiko rejected the ceasefire agreement the next day saying it lacked input from his military wing and brought back the demand for partition. Ngaïssona told a general assembly of Anti-balaka fighters and supporters to lay down their arms and that Anti-balaka would be turned into a political party called Central African Party for Unity and Development (PCUD) but he had little control over the loose network of fighters. In May 2015, a national reconciliation conference organized by the transitional government of the Central Africa Republic took place. This was called the Bangui National Forum. The forum resulted in the adoption of a Republican Pact for Peace, National Reconciliation and Reconstruction and the signature of a Disarmament, Demobilisation, Rehabilitation and Repatriation (DDRR) agreement among nine of ten armed groups.

In January 2015, talks in Nairobi between Joachim Kokate representing the Anti-balaka and Djotodia and Adam of FPRC led to another ceasefire agreement where they called for amnesty for all perpetrators of abuses and the removal of the current transitional authorities. The transitional government and the international community dismissed the deal as it excluded them from the negotiations and termed the parties "Nairobists". In June 2017, another ceasefire was signed in Rome by the government and 14 armed groups including FPRC, but the next day fighting between an FPRC faction and Anti-balaka militias killed more than 100 people. In October 2017, another ceasefire was signed between the UPC, the FPRC, and Anti-balaka groups, and FPRC announced Ali Darassa as coalition vice-president, but fighting continued afterward. In August 2018, Russia and Sudan helped broker another tentative agreement among armed groups. After talks in Khartoum, an African Union led initiative led to an accord between the government and 14 rebel groups in February 2019 called the Political Agreement for Peace and Reconciliation, the eighth such agreement since the war started in 2012.

As part of the accord, Ali Darassa of UPC, Mahamat Al-Khatim of MPC and Sidiki Abass of 3R were given positions as special military advisers to the prime minister's office overseeing special mixed units made of government and rebel soldiers in regions of the country that they already controlled. This did not stop the violence, with 3R killing more than 50 people in several villages in May 2019, leading to MINUSCA to launch a military operation against them. In August 2019, Sidiki Abbas of 3R and Mahamat Al-Khatim of MPC resigned from their government posts. Democratic Front of the Central African People (FDPC) leader Abdoulaye Miskine refused to take his government post and joined a new rebel group formed in June 2019 called "Partie du Rassemblement de la Nation Centrafricaine" (PRNC) to oppose the peace deal, claiming that the deal is a way of rebel leaders to gain money and posts from the government.

Flag of the self-proclaimed Republic of Dar El Kuti

In addition to the largely Muslim Ex-Séléka, newer largely Muslim rebel groups also formed that often fought alongside Ex-Séléka groups. Months after the official dissolution of Séléka it was not known who was in charge of Ex-Séléka factions during talks with Anti-balaka until on 12 July 2014, Michel Djotodia was reinstated as the head of an ad hoc coalition of Ex-Séléka which renamed itself "The Popular Front for the Rebirth (or Renaissance) of Central African Republic" (FPRC). Later in 2014, Noureddine Adam led the FPRC and began demanding independence for the predominantly Muslim north, a move rejected by another general, Ali Darassa, who formed another Ex-Séléka faction called the "Union for Peace in the Central African Republic" (UPC), which was dominant in and around Bambari, while the FPRC's capital is in Bria. Darassa rebuffed multiple attempts to reunify Séléka and threatened FPRC's hegemony. Noureddine Adam declared the autonomous Republic of Logone or Dar El Kuti on 14 December 2015 and intended Bambari as the capital, with the transitional government denouncing the declaration and MINUSCA stating it will use force against any separatist attempt.

Map of the situation in May 2017

Another group is the "Central African Patriotic Movement" (MPC), founded by Mahamat Al Khatim. In western CAR, another rebel group, with no known links to Séléka or Anti-balaka, called "Return, Reclamation, Rehabilitation" (3R) formed in 2015 reportedly by Sidiki Abass, claiming to be protecting Muslim Fulani people from an Anti-balaka militia led by Abbas Rafal. They are accused of displacing 17,000 people in November 2016 and at least 30,000 people in the Ouham-Pendé prefecture in December 2016. In northwestern CAR around Paoua, fighting since December 2017 between "Revolution and Justice" (RJ) and "Movement for the Liberation of the Central African Republic People" (MNLC) displaced around 60,000 people. MNLC, founded in October 2017, was led by Ahamat Bahar, a former member and co-founder of FPRC and MRC, and is allegedly backed by Fulani fighters from Chad. The Christian militant group RJ was formed in 2013, mostly by members of the presidential guard of former president Ange-Félix Patassé, and were composed mainly of ethnic Sara-Kaba. While both groups had previously divided the territory in the Northwest, tensions erupted after the killing of RJ leader, Clément Bélanga, in November 2017.

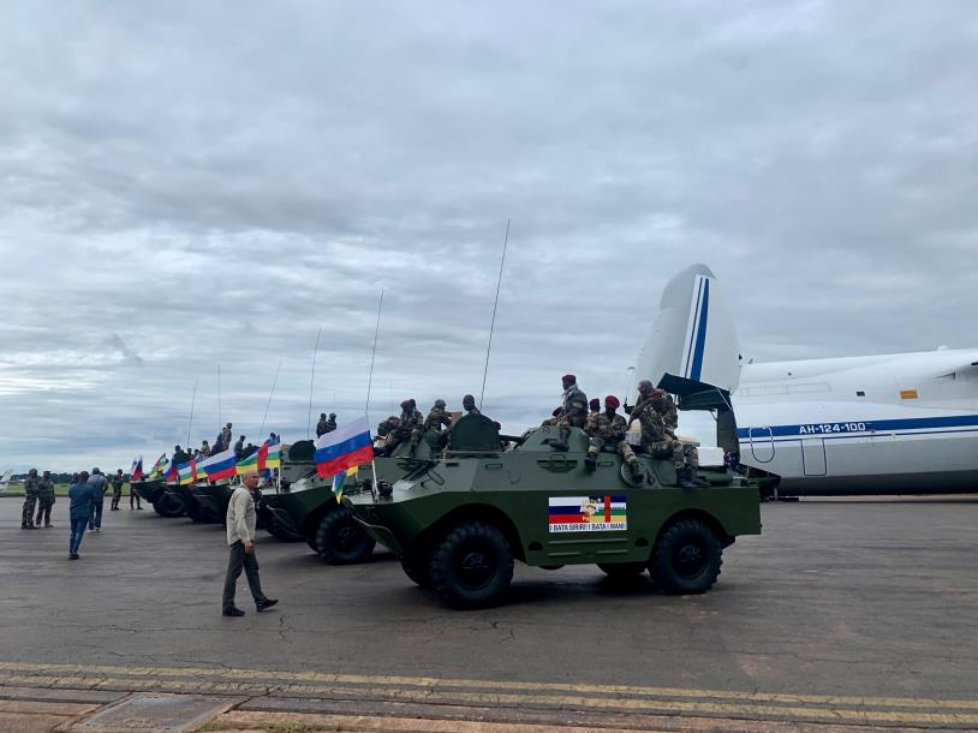
Delivery of Russian BRDM-2 armored vehicles to Central African Republic, October 2020

Largely Muslim Ex-Séléka militias began fighting each other around ethnic lines. The FPRC associated with the Gula and Runga people and the UPC associated with the Fulani. Most of the fighting was in the centrally located Ouaka prefecture, which has the country's second largest city Bambari, because of its strategic location between the Muslim and Christian regions of the country and its wealth. Tensions erupted in competition over control of a goldmine in November 2016, where MPC and the FPRC coalition, which incorporated elements of their former enemy, the Anti-balaka, attacked UPC. The fight for Bambari in early 2017 displaced 20,000. MINUSCA made a robust deployment to prevent FPRC taking the city and in February 2017, Joseph Zoundeiko, the chief of staff of FPRC who previously led the military wing of Séléka, was killed by MINUSCA after crossing one of the red lines.

At the same time, MINUSCA negotiated the removal of Ali Darassa from the city. This led the UPC to find new territory, spreading the fighting from urban to rural areas previously spared. Additionally, the thinly spread MINUSCA relied on Ugandan as well as American special forces to keep the peace in the southeast, as they were part of a campaign to eliminate the Lord's Resistance Army, but the mission ended in April 2017. By the latter half of 2017, the fighting largely shifted to the southeast where the UPC reorganized and were pursued by the FPRC and Anti-balaka with the level of violence only matched by the early stage of the war. About 15,000 people fled from their homes in an attack in May and six U.N. peacekeepers were killed – the deadliest month for the mission yet. By July 2018 the FPRC was headed by Abdoulaye Hissène and based in the northeastern town of N'Délé.

The other ethnic violence among the largely Muslim Ex-Séléka was between Gula and Kara on one side and Runga on the other. In 2019, fighters from the Gula and Kara split from the mostly Runga FPRC. In September 2019, fighting between FPRC and the mostly Kara "Movement of Central African Liberators for Justice" (MLCJ), which was founded by Abakar Sabon, killed at least 24 people and displaced about 24,000. In the 2020 N'Délé clashes, Runga factions of FPRC fought the Goula and Kara rebel groups MLCJ, RPRC and the splinter FPRC faction.

=== Government counteroffensive with Russian support (2021–present) ===
Situation in Central African Republic on 3 January 2021 at the height of CPC control

On 19 December 2020 six rebel groups who together control two-thirds of the country's territory, including 3R, FPRC, and UPC, announced they had formed an alliance called the Coalition of Patriots for Change (CPC), and accused President Touadéra of trying to rig the election scheduled for that month and stated their intent to advance to the capital. Ousted president François Bozizé had announced his intent to run in the presidential election. Bozizé, of the Gbaya, the country's largest ethnic group, retained much support among the population and army members. The government accused Bozizé of fomenting a coup with the rebels after his candidacy for presidential elections was rejected by the country's highest court, but Bozizé denied this. On 22 December, the CPC, in an offensive led by UPC, had taken the country's fourth largest city, Bambari, but the UN peacekeepers had retaken the city the next day. On 3 January 2021, MINUSCA reported that the rebel coalition partially captured Bangassou. On 13 January, the CPC attacked the capital Bangui but were eventually repelled.

On 28 December, it was announced by the electoral commission that 800 (14%) of polling stations failed to operate during the presidential and legislative elections due to violent attacks from armed rebels. On 4 January, the electoral commission declared Touadéra the winner of the presidential election. A state of emergency was declared in 25 January, and President Touadéra has been accused of using that opportunity to crack down on opponents and consolidate power. Pro-Touadéra militias known as the "Sharks" and "7th Territorial Infantry Battalion" are alleged to have been involved in disappearances of members of Bozizé's party and former president's Catherine Samba-Panza, as well as challengers of Touadéra in the recent polls, Anicet-Georges Dologuélé and Martin Ziguélé, report being prevented from exiting the country.

On 20 December 2020 Rwanda confirmed it had sent troops and Russia said it had sent 300 military instructors. Beginning around 2017, Russia began to increasingly support the government of Touadéra, whose personal guard became largely Russian as well. This was largely at the expense of France in its former colony, leading to a disinformation campaign on Facebook between the two powers and France suspended aid and military cooperation with the government in May 2021. Since January 2021, due to the actions of Russia's neo-Nazi-linked Wagner Group and neo-Nazi Russian Imperial Movement, the rebels have been on the retreat for the first time in years. On 25 January 2021, CAR forces, backed by Russian PMCs and Rwandan troops, attacked Boyali, killing 44 rebels who were plotting an assault on the capital. Subsequently, CAR forces, supported by the Russian contractors and Rwandan troops, captured a number of strategic towns throughout February 2021, including towns of Bria, Kaga-Bandoro the Bakouma sub-prefecture, Nzacko, Bossembele, Bouar, Beloko and Bossangoa.

In January 2022, Wagner killed at least 65 civilians in Aïgbado and Yanga villages. In March 2022, Wagner launched a large offensive against armed groups in the northern part of the country, during which they reportedly killed hundreds of civilians, mostly artisanal miners. As the rebels were being pushed back, Valery Zakharov urged them to hand over their leaders to the CAR's security forces. Towards the end of July 2021, the CAR military was leaving the frontline against the CPC to the PMCs. The plan was for government troops to occupy the captured positions after they had been secured by the contractors. The rebels were seen to be moving away from cities and towards peripheral areas and turning to guerilla tactics instead of open fighting.

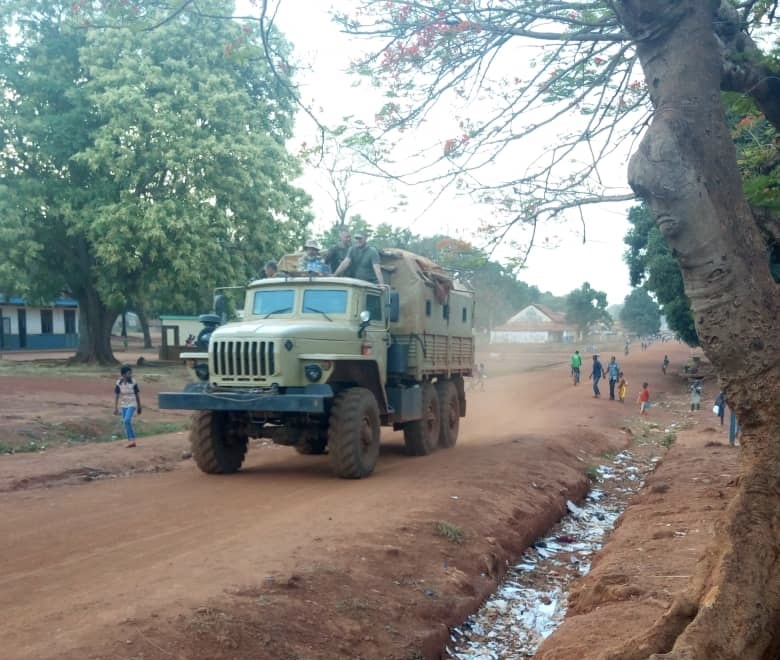
Vehicle with Russian and Syrian mercenaries from the Wagner Group passes through the town of Bria, April 2021

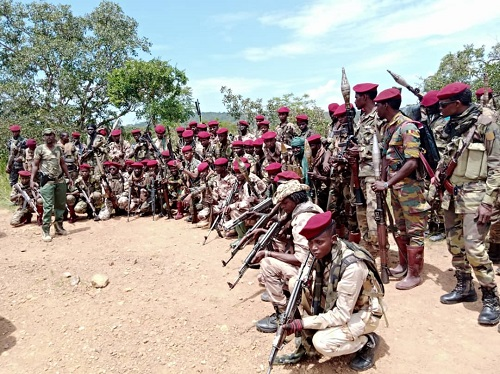
3R rebels, members of Coalition of Patriots for Change

Many of the Anti-balaka groups began fighting alongside the government against the Ex-Séléka and other Muslim majority rebel groups. Black Russians was the term used to describe mostly former Anti-balaka fighting for Wagner. In December 2021, Anti-balaka fighters fought alongside the government and Wagner against UPC and Muslim civilians in the Boyo killings. In April 2022 a series of intercommunal clashes involving 3R rebels and pro-government faction of Anti-balaka led to dozens of deaths and displacement of more than 1,000 people in Gadzi. Another government aligned group is Azande Ani Kpi Gbe (AAKG) which formed in 2023 from Zande self-defense groups. They pushed the UPC out of Bambouti. AAKG received training from Wagner and became known as “Wagner Zandé”. They viewed the government signing a peace deal with UPC in 2025 as a betrayal by the government and AAKG’s integration into the army was suspended. In January 2026, they clashed with government forces in Haut-Mbomou.

On 25 March 2021, 3R rebel leader Sidiki Abass, whose group is accused of war crimes, succumbed to his injuries in the northern part of the country. In April 2021, the UPC, then the biggest of the armed rebel groups, withdrew from the CPC and asked to talk with the government. On 4 December 2022 leader of four armed groups (MLCJ, RPRC, UFR and UFR-R) signed in Bangui an agreement announcing their dissolution. On 11 July 2025, The UPC and 3R signed disarmament agreements with the government of President Touadéra. The deal was precipitated by a ceasefire agreement and negotiations mediated by and ensured by Chad. Under the terms agreed to by the government and the two groups, they will totally disarm, dissolve, and reintegrate with normal society.

== Atrocities ==
=== Religious cleansing ===
It is argued that the focus of the initial disarmament efforts exclusively on the Séléka inadvertently handed the anti-Balaka the upper hand, leading to the forced displacement of Muslim civilians by anti-Balaka in Bangui and western CAR. While comparisons were often posed as the "next Rwanda", others suggested that the Bosnian Genocide may be a more apt comparison, as people were moving into religiously cleansed neighbourhoods. Even as Séléka was closing in on the capital, clashes began in Bangui's PK5 neighborhood, where members of ethnic groups with ties to Séléka were attacked, such as the Gula. After the withdrawal of Séléka leaders from Bangui, there was a wave of attacks against Muslims with anti-Muslim pogroms and looting of Muslim neighborhoods, including the lynching of the Muslim former Health Minister Joseph Kalite by Christian self-defence groups. Accounts state of lynch mobs, including that of uniformed soldiers, stoning or hacking Muslims then dismembering and burning their bodies in the streets. In 2014, Amnesty International blamed the Anti-balaka militia of causing a "Muslim exodus of historic proportions and reported several massacres against Muslim civilians, forcing thousands of Muslims to flee the country.

Other sources report incidents of Muslims being cannibalized. On 10 April, MISCA troops escorted over 1,000 Muslims fleeing to Chad with a police source saying "not a single Muslim remains in Bossangoa." The Muslim population of Bangui dropped 99% from 138,000 to 900. In 2015, Samantha Power, the U.S. ambassador to the United Nations, said 417 of the country's 436 mosques had been destroyed, and Muslim women were so scared of going out in public they were giving birth in their homes instead of going to the hospital. UN Secretary-General Ban Ki-moon warned of a de facto partition of the country into Muslim and Christian areas as a result of the sectarian fighting. Some Muslims of the country were also wary of the French presence in MISCA, with the French accused of not doing enough to stop attacks by Christian militias. One of the cited reasons for the difficulty in stopping attacks by Anti-balaka militias was the mob nature of these attacks.

=== Ethnic violence ===
Much of the tension is also over historical antagonism between agriculturalists, who largely comprise Anti-balaka and nomadic groups, who largely comprise Séléka fighters. There was ethnic violence during fighting between the Ex-Séléka militias FPRC and UPC, with the FPRC targeting Fulani people who largely make up the UPC and the UPC targeting the Gula and Runga people, who largely make up FPRC, as being sympathetic to FPRC. In November 2016 fighting in Bria that killed 85 civilians, FPRC was reported targeting Fulani people in house-to-house searches, lootings, abductions and killings.

Within the FPRC, the Gula wing attacked the Runga wing in Ndele in April 2020, with at least 25 people being killed.

It is also reported that in 2019, violence broke out in the northeastern region, where the killing of an ethnic Kara man sparked heavy fighting between the mainly Kara MLCJ and largely Runga FPRC.

=== Prosecutions and trials ===
By March 2014, the UNSC had authorised a probe into possible genocide, which in turn followed International Criminal Court Chief Prosecutor Fatou Bensouda initiating a preliminary investigation into the "extreme brutality" and whether it falls into the court's remit. The UNSC mandate probe would be led by Cameroonian lawyer Bernard Acho Muna, who was the deputy chief prosecutor for the International Criminal Tribunal for Rwanda, former Mexican Secretary of Foreign Affairs Jorge Castañeda and Mauritanian lawyer Fatimata M'Baye. The ICC began prosecutions and Alfred Yekatom of the Anti-Balaka who was involved in the 'Battle of Bangui' and Patrice Edouard Ngaïssona of the Anti-Balaka were arrested in 2018, although no one from the Ex-Séléka was arrested. Eric Danboy Bagale, head of former president François Bozizé's guard and head of the mostly Christian anti-Balaka militias, was arrested in Paris on 19 September 2020 for war crimes in relation to revenge killings.

=== Violence against aid workers and crime ===
In 2015, humanitarian aid workers in the CAR were involved in more than 365 security incidents, more than Syria, Afghanistan, Iraq and Somalia. By 2017, more than two-thirds of all health facilities have been damaged or destroyed. The crimes are often committed by individuals not associated with any armed rebel groups. There have been jail breaks with more than 500 inmates escaping from Nagaragba Central Prison, including fighters of both Christian and Muslim militias. By 2017, only eight of 35 prisons function and few courts operate outside the capital. The international press freedom organization Reporters Without Borders said it was concerned that the rebel attacks were taking their toll on the ability of radio stations to operate in the CAR, with condemnation of the killing of journalist Elisabeth Blanche Olofio, who worked for Radio Bé-Oko which is part of a network of apolitical radio stations known as L'Association des Radios Communautaires de Centrafrique.

=== Economic impact ===
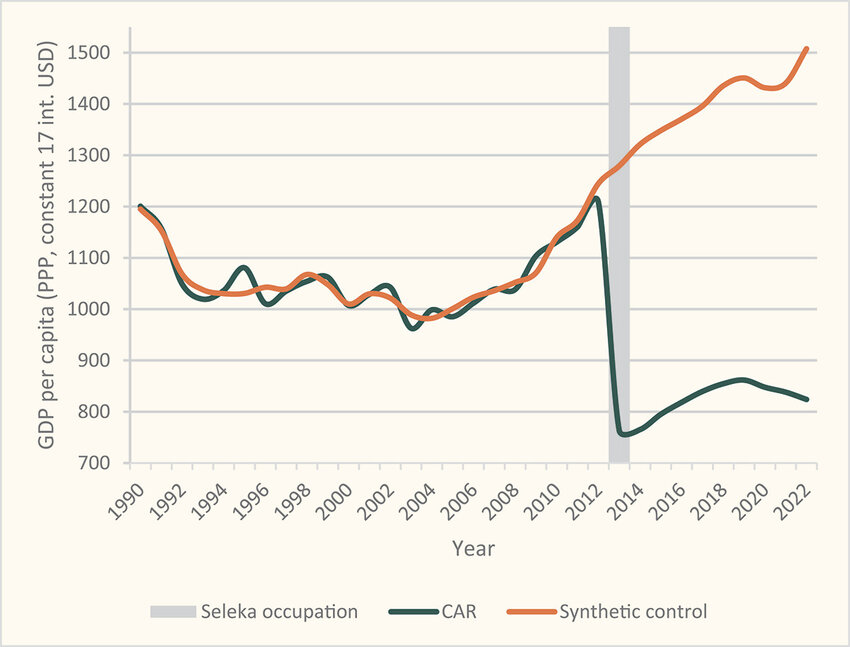
Income level in Central African Republic and its synthetic control, 1990–2022

The civil war has inflicted a severe economic toll on the country. Research employing the synthetic control method (SCM)—a statistical technique that constructs a counterfactual scenario using data from comparable countries—estimates that the conflict caused a national GDP per capita decline of 45.3 percent to 47.8 percent over the decade from 2013 to 2022. This translates to a cumulative GDP loss ranging from US$29.7 billion to US$32.4 billion in purchasing power parity (PPP) terms. Even under the most conservative estimates, a minimum decline of 35.3 percent in GDP per capita is observed over the same period. These findings are reinforced by remote sensed GDP data derived from nighttime lights and population data, which provide an alternative measure of economic activity in areas with limited official statistics.

In comparison to other conflicts analyzed using similar methods, the economic cost of the CAR civil war ranks among the highest in terms of relative GDP per capita decline. Moreover, the estimates surpass the economic costs of the Rwandan genocide—derived from another statistical methodology—which were estimated to reach between 25 and 30 percent of per capita GDP one decade after, which seems striking given the humanitarian cost of this event.

One potential explanation for the significant economic impact of the conflict is the disruption of the two main trade corridors: the road axis from Douala to Bangui and the river axis from Pointe-Noire-Brazzaville up to the port of Bangui, especially during the initial years of the war, particularly during the Séléka occupation of the capital city. Another contributing factor could be the direct and indirect destruction of capital stock, resulting from fiscal inability to maintain existing infrastructure, and the long-term impact of the war on technical capacities for both the private sector and the administration.

== Fatalities ==
=== 2013 ===
Total fatalities were 2,286 – at least 2,396.

March to April — around 130 people killed in Bangui. 78 bodies in Bangui a week after captured by rebels.
12 June — villagers killed.
21 August — killed during the month.
9 September — Bouca violence – 73-153 killed.
6 October — 14 killed.
9 October — 30-60 killed in clashes.
12 October — 6 killed.
December — 600+ killed in "Battle of Bangui", as antibalaka militias unsuccessfully attempt to overthrow Djotodia. Two children were beheaded with a total of 16 children killed in Bangui in late December.

=== 2014 ===
22 January — people were killed after gunmen in Bouar attacked a convoy in an attempt to halt Muslim refugees trying to flee the violence.
February — 75 people were killed in the town of Boda, in Lobaye province, according to a local priest. Anti-balaka militants attacked Guen resulting in the deaths of 60 people. As a result, hundreds of Muslim refugees sought shelter at a church in Carnot.
29 March — Chadian peacekeepers not a part of MISCA entered Bangui's PK12 district market and allegedly indiscriminately opened fire resulting in 30 deaths and over 300 injuries.
30 March — A Muslim throws a grenade at a group of Christian mourners resulting in 11 deaths.
May — Séléka rebels kill at least 30 at a Catholic church compound.
23 June — Anti-balaka forces killed 18 at Bambari. Several Séléka then killed 10 anti-balaka.
8 July — 17 people were killed when Séléka forces attacked a Catholic church in Bambari.
August — 34 people were reported killed by Séléka fighters around Mbrès.

=== 2015 ===
September — At least 42 people were reported killed.

=== 2016 ===
25 October — people were reported killed in Bambari.

=== 2017 ===
Anti-balaka attacked Bangassou, slaughtering dozens of Muslim civilians as well as 12 UN peacekeepers.

=== 2019 ===
May — 3R massacres more than 50 people in several villages in the northwest.

=== 2020 ===
February — Members of the Popular Front for the Rebirth of Central Africa (FPRC) attacked MINUSCA forces in Birao, leading to 12 FPRC forces being killed.
April — At least 25 people killed in Ndele when the Gula faction of the FPRC attacked the Runga faction.
December — 3 UN peacekeepers from Burundi were killed in Dekoa

=== 2021 ===
January — One UN peacekeeper killed when CPC launched an attack on Bangui.

October — 34 civilians were killed by alleged UPC rebels in the village of Matchika near Bambari.

=== 2022 ===
April — 6 soldiers were killed when CPC militants attacked a military camp at the outskirts of Bakouma.

=== 2023 ===
November — 5 civilians were killed when CPC launched an attack on Moyenne Sido.

== Displaced people ==
In May 2014, it was reported that around 600,000 people in CAR were internally displaced with 160,000 of these in the capital Bangui. By May 2014, 100,000 people had fled to neighbouring Cameroon, the Democratic Republic of Congo and Chad. As of 2017, there are more than 1.1 million displaced people in a country of about 5 million people, the highest ever recorded in the country, with about half a million refugees outside CAR and about 600,000 internally displaced. Cameroon hosted the most refugees, more than 135,000, about 90% of whom are Fulani, even though they constituted 6% of CAR's population.

In December 2020, after a contested election, rebels known as the Coalition of Patriots for Change or the CPC seized main roadways and prevented the flow of goods into Bouar. These and other similar efforts have caused an estimated 100,000 to leave their homes. A month later, January 2021, the number had doubled to 200,000, including 92,000 refugees in the Democratic Republic of the Congo and 13,000 in Chad, the Republic of the Congo, and Cameroon.

== International response ==
=== Organizations ===
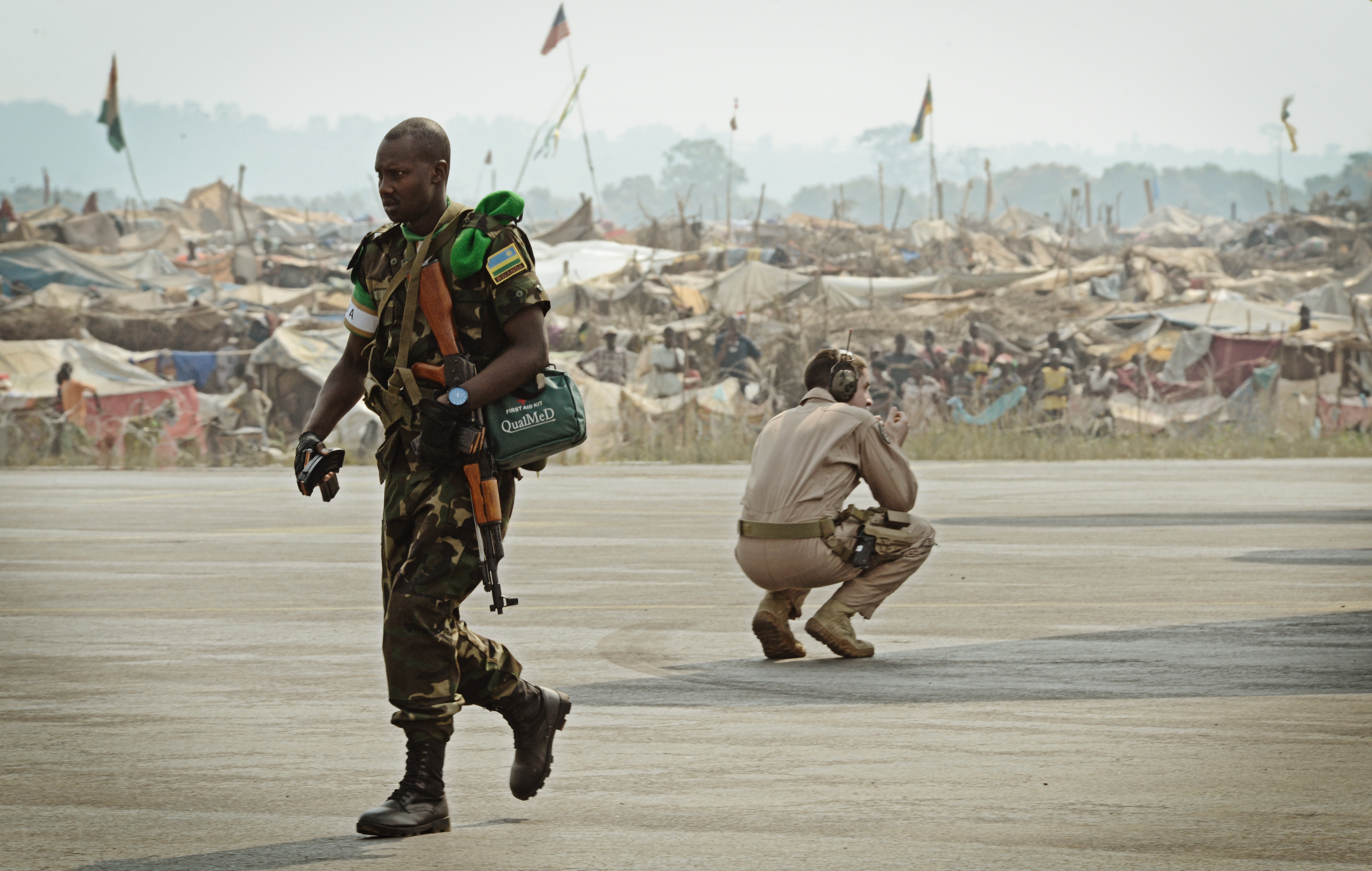
A Rwandan soldier near a refugee camp full of displaced residents

- African Union – Yayi Boni, then-chairman of the African Union, held a press conference in Bangui, stating, "I beg my rebellious brothers, I ask them to cease hostilities, to make peace with President Bozizé and the Central African people ... If you stop fighting, you are helping to consolidate peace in Africa. African people do not deserve all this suffering. The African continent needs peace and not war." Boni went on to call for dialogue between the current government and the rebels. The African Union suspended the Central African Republic from its membership on 25 March 2013.
- European Union – On 21 December 2012 the High Representative for Foreign Affairs Catherine Ashton called on the armed rebel groups to "cease all hostilities and to respect the Libreville Comprehensive Peace Agreement." European Commissioner for Humanitarian Aid Kristalina Georgieva added that she was deeply worried over the situation in the country and that she strongly urged "all armed groups to respect international humanitarian law and the activities of humanitarians". On 1 January Ashton once again expressed concern over the violence and urged all parties involved to "take all necessary measures to end, without delay, all exactions against populations in Bangui neighbourhoods that undermine chances of a peaceful dialogue."
  - On 10 February 2014, the European Union established a military operation entitled EUFOR RCA, with the aim "to provide temporary support in achieving a safe and secure environment in the Bangui area, with a view to handing over to African partners." The French Major General Philippe Pontiès was appointed as a commander of this force.
- United Nations – On 26 December 2012 the U.N. announced it was pulling all non-essential personnel out of the country due to the worsening security situation. In a statement, U.N. Secretary-General Ban Ki-moon condemned the rebels' advance and warned that it had the potential to "gravely undermine the peace agreements in place." He also called on the government "to ensure the safety and security of U.N. personnel and its premises." On 31 January 2020, the United Nations Security Council approved an extension of an arms embargo against the Central African Republic until 31 July 2020.

=== Countries ===
Regional

- Gabon/Chad/Cameroon/Congo/Equatorial Guinea sent troops in 2013 to make up an African Union Multinational Force for Central Africa (FOMAC) peacekeeping force in CAR.

Others

- Brazil – On 25 December 2012, the Ministry of Foreign Affairs of Brazil issued a statement "urging the parties to observe an immediate cessation of hostilities and any acts of violence against the civilian population" and called for "the restoration of institutional legality in the Central African Republic". The Brazilian government stated that it had been in contact with the small number of Brazilian nationals residing in the country.
- Estonia – On 9 May 2014, sent 55 troops to join the EU's EUFOR RCA mission.
- Georgia – 140 troops joined EU's military mission in the Central African Republic.
- France – On 27 December 2012, CAR President Francois Bozizé requested international assistance to help with the rebellion, in particular from France and the United States. French President François Hollande rejected the plea, saying that the 250 French troops stationed at Bangui M'Poko International Airport are there "in no way to intervene in the internal affairs". Separately, a Foreign Ministry statement condemned "the continued hostility by the rebel groups", adding that the only solution to the crisis was dialogue.
- South Africa – South Africa had numerous troops in the CAR since 2007. A Special Forces unit protected President Bozizé under Operation Morero and a second group trained FACA under Operation Vimbezela. Defence Minister Nosiviwe Mapisa-Nqakula traveled to Bangui on 31 December 2012 to assess the situation. On 8 January 2013 the South African National Defence Force deployed 200 additional troops to the CAR, half of the force authorized by President Jacob Zuma. On 21 March President Bozizé traveled to Pretoria to meet with Zuma, allegedly to discuss the 72-hour ultimatum that the rebels had given him. The South African troops from the 1 Parachute Battalion suffered 13 killed and 27 wounded while defending against the advancing Séléka. On 24 March 2013 SANDF soldiers began withdrawing to Entebbe air base, with the reported intention to return to the CAR to retake control from Séléka.
- United States of America – On 17 December 2012 the State Department's Overseas Security Advisory Council published an emergency message warning US citizens about armed groups active in Mbrès and advising them to avoid travel outside Bangui. US Embassy personnel were prohibited from traveling by road outside the capital. On 24 December the State Department issued another warning. All non-essential personnel were evacuated, and the embassy switched to limited emergency consular services. On 28 December, the United States Embassy in Bangui suspended operations due to the ongoing rebel attacks; with Ambassador Laurence D. Wohlers and his diplomatic staff evacuating the country.
- Serbia – In accordance with Security Council's Resolution 2149, Government of Serbia approved engagement of Serbian Armed Forces. On 20 September 2014 two military observers and two staff officers are deployed. Later, on 11 December 2014, 68 more personnel have been deployed in this mission. On 15 December 2016, Serbia deployed team for emergency medical assistance and level 1 medical team, as part of the EUTM RCA (European Union Training Mission).

== See also ==
- List of conflicts in Africa
- Cahier Africain, a documentary which provides one viewpoint on the conflict
