= Mahamat Said Abdel Kani =

Central African warlord

- Born: 25 February 1970 (age 56); Bria, Central African Republic
- Military career
- Allegiance: Séléka (CPJP); FPRC; CPC
- Years: 2008–2021
- Conflict: Central African Republic Civil War
- Criminal information
- Conviction: Crimes against humanity (4 counts)
- Criminal charges: War crimes Crimes against humanity
- Capture status: ICC custody

Mahamat Said Abdel Kani (born 25 February 1970) is a former general of the Popular Front for the Rebirth of Central African Republic and commander of Séléka who was arrested in 2021 on suspicion of war crimes and crimes against humanity in the Central African Republic. Said is the first Séléka commander to face charges at the International Criminal Court (ICC). Said was convicted on four crimes against humanity in September 2026.

== Biography ==
=== Early life ===
Born into a family of diamond collectors on 25 February 1970 in Bria, Said joined the Convention of Patriots for Justice and Peace (CPJP) rebel group in 2008 to avenge his nephew's death. He participated in a rebel attack 20 kilometres (12 mi) from Bria in 2008.

=== Séléka ===
Said participated in the Battle of Bangui. After the victory of Séléka in March 2013, the Minister of Public Security, Noureddine Adam, appointed Said as the director of the Central African Bureau for the Repression of Organised Crime (OCRB) on 12 April 2013.

As director of OCRB, Said was responsible for torture, imprisonment, persecution, and enforced disappearances. He resigned as the director of OCRB in January 2014.

=== Post-Séléka ===
After the dissolution of Séléka, Said joined the FPRC. As a member of FPRC, he was a diamond dealer who heavily contributed to the FPRC budget. He owned several diamond mines in the Bria and Nzacko regions.

In mid-December 2020, Said joined the anti-government rebel coalition, CPC. As a member of CPC, he was one of the orchestrators of CPC attacks in Nzacko and Bakouma.

=== Arrest and trial ===
On 7 January 2019 the ICC issued an arrest warrant for Said for war crimes and crimes against humanity. He was arrested by MINUSCA on 20 January 2021 in Bria. He was brought to Camp de Roux, Bangui and transferred to the ICC headquarters in Den Haag on 24 January 2021. The Office of the Prosecutor alleged that in 2013 he had ordered and participated in the illegal imprisonment and torture of those he suspected of supporting former President François Bozizé, in his capacity as director of OCRB.

Said's trial began on 26 September 2022. He pleaded not guilty. On 23 September 2026 he was convicted on four counts of crimes against humanity but acquitted of the charges of war crimes.

== Personal life ==
He can speak Sango, French, and Arabic. His brother, Kousko Abdel Kani, was a former FPRC general and was arrested in November 2021 by the Wagner Group in Bria.
