= Abdoulaye Hissène =

Central African politician (born 1967)

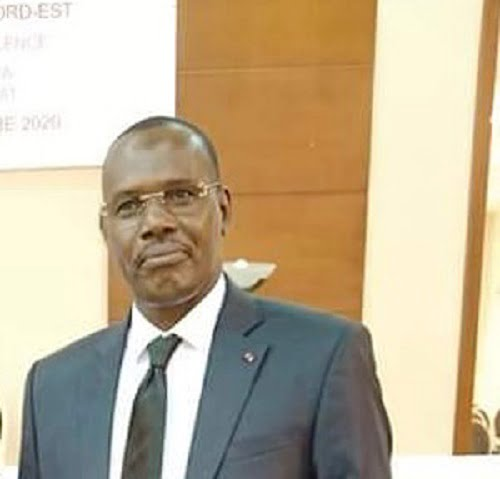

FPRC general
- In office 2014–2023

Minister of Youth and Sports
- In office 31 March 2013 – 10 January 2014
- President: Michel Djotodia
- Prime Minister: Nicolas Tiangaye
- Preceded by: Patrice-Edouard Ngaïssona
- Succeeded by: Armel Ningatoloum Sayo

Personal details
- Born: 1 January 1967 (age 59) Akourousoulba, Bamingui-Bangoran

Abdoulaye Hissène (born 1 January 1967 in Akourousoulba) is a former Central African warlord, general in the Popular Front for the Rebirth of Central African Republic (FPRC), minister of youth, sanctioned by international institutions for committing multiple war crimes.

== Life ==
He was born on 1 January 1967 in Akourousoulba village near the border with Chad. He is a Muslim and belongs to the Runga ethnic group. His father was an environmental guard responsible for supervising protected areas in the region. When he was young, Hissène's father taught him and his siblings hunting and use of weapons. According to other sources, his father was Abba Adoum Kette, an influential diamond collector from Bria. Another son was reportedly the warlord Mahamet Saleh. In the 1990s and 2000s, Hissène pursued a career in the mineral trade like his uncle. He worked as a trader of diamonds and gold for the Central African company SODIAM. After accumulating multiple debts he fled to Chad in 2009 to avoid paying them back. In his 40s, he started selling luxury cars, during which he formed business connections with the entourage of President of Chad Idriss Déby and influential businessmen. Using fake Chadian IDs, he opened two bank accounts that he used between 2009 and 2010, one in Société Générale and the other in the United Bank of Africa (UBA) in the capital of Chad, N'Djamena.

=== Civil war ===
In 2009 he joined Central African rebel group Convention of Patriots for Justice and Peace (CPJP). He declared himself president of CPJP in 2011. From 2009 to 2012 he obtained a fortune from diamond trade, with his fighters responsible for multiple war crimes. In August 2012 he received ministerial post as a part of peace deal with the government. From March 2013 to January 2014 he served as a youth and sports minister under the Djotodia presidency. From February to August 2014 he served as a minister and presidential adviser for youth under the Samba-Panza presidency. In June 2014 he was nominated first counselor to the Popular Front for the Rebirth of Central African Republic (FPRC), new ex-Seleka group.

In September 2015 he ordered his fighters to kill a 17-year old Muslim boy in Bangui and spread rumors that anti-balaka did it to instigate violence in the capital. He ordered his fighters to shoot at people participating in referendum on 17 December 2015, killing at least five of them. On 15 March 2016 he was arrested by police before his fighters forced his release. On 19 June 2016 fighters led by him and Gaye kidnapped five police officers in Bangui.

On 12 August 2016 he decided to escape PK5 district. Together with Haroun Gaye and Hamit Tidjani they painted seven vehicles white in order to resemble UN vehicles. 35 heavily armed ex-Seleka fighter left in total. While passing through the PK12 checkpoint a soldier fired at them killing one fighter. In Damara they again clashed with soldiers. One fighter who fell off vehicle was killed by Anti-balaka. They were stopped by MINUSCA in Sibut. They abandoned their vehicles. MINUSCA arrested 11 fighters, but Gaye and Hissène managed to escape on foot. In early September 2016 he arrived N'Délé together with Gaye. From there the group supposedly travelled to Sikikede in Vakaga prefecture where they met with Noureddine Adam, before going to Bria to attend ex-Séléka General Assembly. In November 2016 during clashes in Bria he ordered groups of militiamen to kill Fula civilians. He stoked ethnic tensions, encouraging Anti-balaka fighters to attack the UPC armed group. In 2019 he married daughter of sultan of Birao.

In 2020 he refused to join the Coalition of Patriots for Change. In February 2021 he blocked a weapon shipment designated for CPC fighters. On 28 April 2023 he announced dissolution of his faction of the FPRC.

On 5 September 2023 he was arrested in Bangui. He was accused of war crimes and crimes against humanity and was brought before the Special Criminal Court.
