= Logone =

Logone may refer to:

- Logone River;
- Republic of Logone;
- Logone Oriental (disambiguation), or
- Logone Occidental (disambiguation)
