= Aïfa =

- Location in Central African Republic
- Coordinates: 9°49′16″N 21°38′30″E
- Country: Central African Republic
- Prefecture: Vakaga
- Sub-prefecture: Birao
- Commune: Ouandja

Population (2016)
  - Total: 13,747
- Time zone: UTC + 1

Aïfa (also known as Haïfa) is a village located near Sikkikede in Vakaga Prefecture, Central African Republic.

== History ==
A Sudanese nomad militia attacked Aïfa on 27 August 2002 due to the tension between the locals and Sudanese nomads following the death of Yaya Ramadhan three months before. This led to the clash between joint ECOFAC-village self-defense forces and the militia. More than 150 militias and around 25 villagers were killed.

In February 2023, CPC rebels retreated to Aïfa after they attacked Sikkikede.

== Demographics ==
Runga makes up the majority of Aïfa population and Aiki is commonly spoken in the village.

== Education ==
Aïfa has two schools.

== Healthcare ==
There is one health post in the village.
