= Sikkikede =

Sikkikede Ndah
- Location in the Central African Republic
- Coordinates: 9°46′41″N 21°36′41″E
- Country: Central African Republic
- Prefecture: Vakaga
- Sub-prefecture: Birao
- Commune: Ouandja

Population (2016)
  - Total: 37,920
- Time zone: UTC + 1

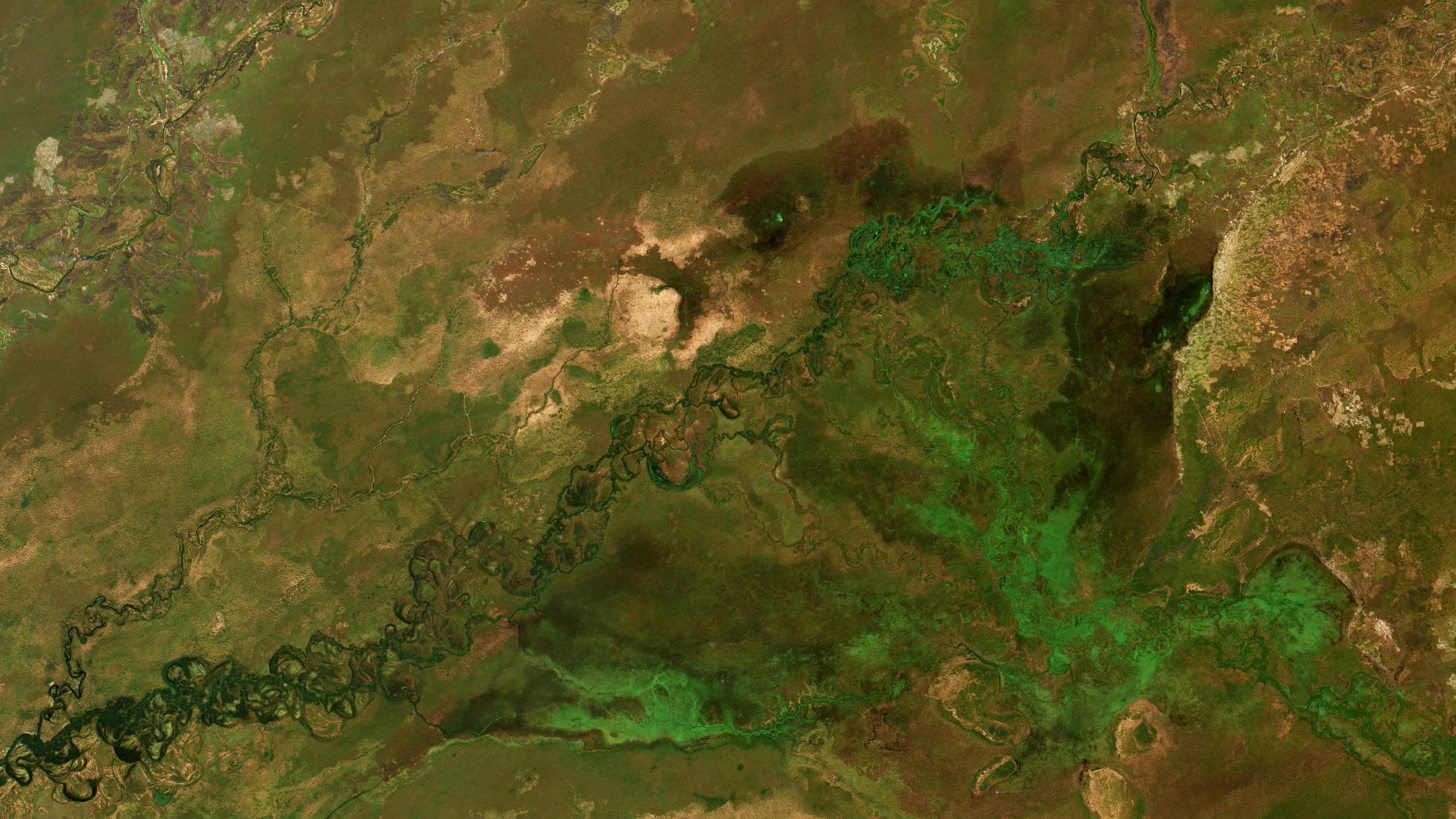
Satellite view of the Sikkikede area

Sikkikede (also known as Ndah), also spelled Sikikédé and Sikikede, is a town in Vakaga Prefecture, Central African Republic. It is the largest settlement in Vakaga, with a population of around 20.000 people. CPJP established the headquarter in Sikkikede.

== History ==
In 1962, Sikkikede had a population of 522 people, making it the largest settlement in Vakaga.

Together with Mélé, a clash took place in Sikkikede between UFDR and CPJP on 10 April 2011. Responding to this clash, the villagers fled to Chad and Tiringoulou.

In 2012, Sikkikede faced a food crisis. Of 1332 children that were screened by International Medical Corps’ nutrition, 21% of the children suffered from global acute malnutrition and 7% had severe acute malnutrition.

=== Central African Republic Civil War (2012-present) ===
Sikkikede was reportedly controlled by FPRC group led by Tidjani Karan in 2015.

In March 2022, there was a clash between FPRC, RPRC and MLCJ and Wagner Group in Sikkikede. The clash led to the death of 20 people, and some shops and houses were burned.

On 28 January 2023, the rebel withdrew from Sikkide and FACA and Wagner Group captured the town after a clash in Gounda. They carried out door-to-door searches to find the rebels. They did not find them. On 14 February 2023, CPC rebels attacked Sikkikede. Clash happened for two hours, and CPC captured the town. The government lost about 15 soldiers and the rebels captured 20. Responding to the CPC's attack, most of the residents fled to the bush while others, mostly women and children, went to Mélé.

On 23 February 2023, the government forces recaptured Sikkikede from CPC rebels with assistance from the Wagner Group.

Due to logistic issues, FACA and Wagner withdrew from Sikkikede on 24 May 2023. Two days later, a clash between the town's defense group and CPC occurred in Sikkikede. Armed with homemade weapons, the self-defense group repulsed the CPC attack and killed ten rebels. Women and children fled to the bush because of the attack.

CPC rebels attacked FACA positions in Sikkikede on 7 March 2024 and briefly occupied the town. They then retreated from the town after the arrival of reinforcement forces and air attacks. Four soldiers and twenty rebels were killed. Due to the attack, hundreds of families sought refuge in the bush, and some of them returned after the government forces and Wagner recaptured the town.

== Demographics ==
Runga makes up the majority of the Sikkikede population. Baggara Arabs can also be found in the town where they engage in herding activity.

== Economy ==
There is one market in the town. The town also becomes the major trade hub in Vakaga due to the presence of pastoralists. Near the town, there are artisanal gold mining sites named Mandjan.

== Education ==
There are three schools in the town.

== Healthcare ==
Sikkikede has one public health post.

== Bibliography ==
- Concordis (2022). PROMOTING PEACEFUL TRANSHUMANCE IN NORTHERN CENTRAL AFRICAN REPUBLIC (PDF) (Report).
