= Akourousoulba =

- Location in the Central African Republic
- Coordinates: 8°58′N 20°46′E
- Country: Central African Republic
- Prefecture: Bamingui-Bangoran
- Sub-prefecture: N'Délé
- Time zone: UTC + 1

Akourousoulba or Akoursoulbak is a village in the Bamingui-Bangoran Prefecture in the northern Central African Republic.

== History ==
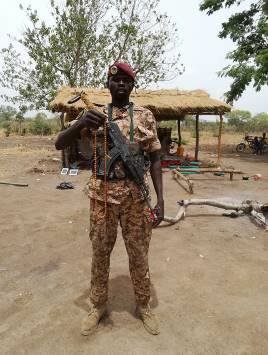
FPRC fighter in Akourousoulba, April 2018

Akourousoulba used to be a stronghold of Popular Front for the Rebirth of Central African Republic armed group. Abdoulaye Hissène, one of leaders of FPRC was born there. On 22 August 2022 Russian mercenaries from Wagner Group arrived in Akourousoulba, looting shops, before withdrawing the next day. On 2 September CPC rebels attacked the town. After day of heavy fighting rebels managed to expel armed forces from Akourousoulba before withdrawing on 4 September.

== Education ==
Akourousoulba has one school.

== Healthcare ==
There is one health center in the village.
