= 2022 Gadzi clashes =

Mass killings in Central African Republic

- Part of the Central African Republic Civil War
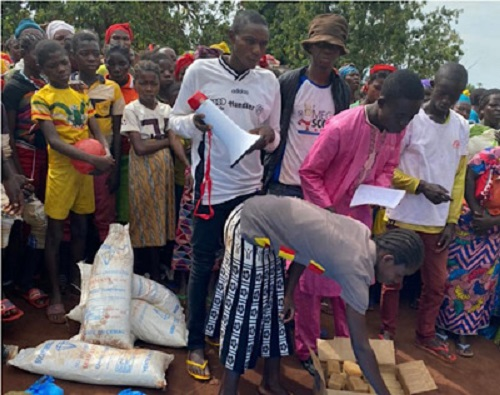
- Representative Janssen Wandoui Si-Ingkossi visits displaced people in Yaloké following clashes in nearby Gadzi
Date	27 March – 11 April 2022
Location	Gadzi and Yaloke, Central African Republic 5°12′N 16°54′E

Belligerents
Anti-balaka (pro-government faction); Local population	Return, Reclamation, Rehabilitation; Armed Fulani population

Commanders and leaders
Severin Ndoguia	General Bobbo

Strength
150+	

Casualties and losses
- Dozens killed, 2,300+ displaced
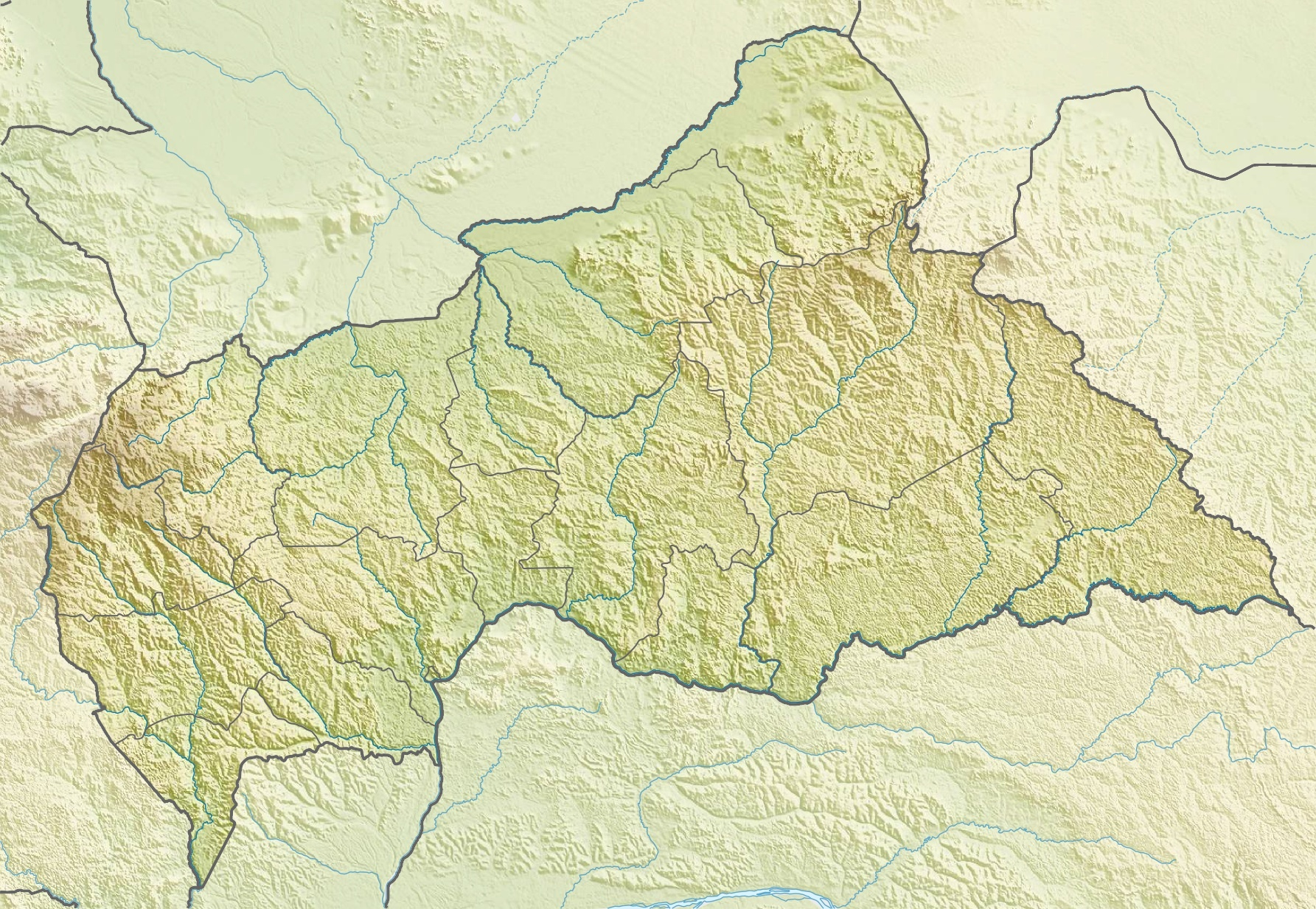
- Location within Central African Republic 2022 Gadzi clashes (Africa)

Map of places mentioned
Blue = 3R attack, yellow = Anti-balaka attack, red = presence of armed forces

In late March and April 2022 series of intercommunal clashes between in Gadzi and neighboring Yaloke subprefectures in the Central African Republic resulted in dozens of deaths and more than two thousand displaced people.

== Attacks ==
On 27 March around 150–200 Fulani and Return, Reclamation, Rehabilitation (3R) rebels attacked Gontikiri village near Gadzi with light and heavy weapons. Since the end of March, a series of attacks in the region have killed ten civilians and injured one person severely.

On 3 April group of 12 merchants on board of seven motorcycles was caught by 3R rebels in Zawélé village while travelling towards weekly market in Guen village. They stripped them of all their belongings and burned down all the motorcycles. Victims, severely beaten were hospitalized in serious condition. Local population in response carried out a reprisal attack on a camp of Fulani Mbororo herders, causing several deaths and injuries. In response Fulani asked 3R rebels to come to support them. The rebels attacked local population in the villages of Gontikiri, Zawélé, Mayaka, Moinam, Gbon, Zokombo, and Zaoro-Yanga. Yassimbéré and Boibalé villages were attacked on 8 April with seven people being shot dead by armed Fulani. Their motorcycles were burnt. On the same day alleged 3R rebels attacked convoy of seven motorcycles in Gontikiri village killing three people, looting stuff and burning motorcycles. Attackers in total killed dozens of people and vandalized and looted people's houses and belongings as well as causing massive population displacement. Local youths reportedly tried to repel the invaders however without weapons attackers managed to overran the region with the town of Gadzi being reportedly emptied of its population.

On 8 April between 15:00 and 17:00 Anti-balaka fighters attacked Fulani camp located in the bush near the village of Zawa. At least a dozen people were killed, thirty oxen slaughtered and houses burnt. The Anti-balaka fighters belonged to pro-government faction led by general Severin Ndoguia alias "Le Bleu". On 11 April around 15:00 Anti-balaka fighters attacked Fulani camp in Bekadili village. Around 13 people were killed in total and 100 oxen were stolen by the attackers.

=== Population displacement ===
Fighting caused massive population displacement with 2,000 people fleeing to Zawa and 300 to Yaloke. with some people reportedly in the bush without food. Displaced people found refuge with host families and in a school. Some of them were without shelter having to sleep in the open. Humanitarian partners were reported to be mobilizing. It was also reported that refugees were lacking medical care, food and drinking water. Local deputy, Janssen Wandoui So-Ingkossi went to Yaloke and Gadzi where he distributed food to the people. He called on government and international organizations to help displaced people as well for armed forces to be deployed in Gadzi. They mayor of commune of Mbali, Fidèle Zoranga, also called for deployment of armed forces in the area which he described as abandoned.
