= Josué Binoua =

Central African politician

Minister of Public Security, Immigration and Emigration, and Public Order
- In office 22 August 2013 – 2014
- President: Michel Djotodia
- Prime Minister: Nicolas Tiangaye
- Preceded by: Noureddine Adam
- Succeeded by: Wangao Kizimalé
- In office 13 February 2013 – 31 March 2013
- President: François Bozizé
- Prime Minister: Nicolas Tiangaye
- Preceded by: Claude Richard Gouandja
- Succeeded by: Noureddine Adam

Minister of Territorial Administration and Decentralization
- In office 22 April 2011 – 3 February 2013
- Prime Minister: Faustin-Archange Touadéra
- Preceded by: Élie Wefio
- Succeeded by: Léon Diberet

Reverend Josué Binoua is a Central African politician and religious figure who served in the government of the Central African Republic as Minister of Territorial Administration from 2011 to 2013 and as Minister of Security in 2013.

== Life and career ==
Binoua ran as an independent candidate for President in the 2005 general election, finishing in eighth place with 1.52% of the vote. Although a member of the Union of the Active Forces of the Nation opposition coalition, Binoua did not endorse a candidate in the May 2005 run-off between François Bozizé and Martin Ziguélé; Bozizé eventually won.

Binoua was appointed to the government as Minister of Territorial Administration and Decentralization in April 2011. Following a rebellion in December 2012, a national unity government was appointed on 3 February 2013, composed of Bozizé supporters, the opposition, and rebels; Binoua was retained in the government but moved to the post of Minister of Public Security, Immigration and Emigration, and Public Order.

Bozizé was ousted by the rebels, led by Michel Djotodia, in March 2013. Although Binoua had been loyal to Bozizé, he cooperated with the new government headed by Djotodia; he received the post of Adviser for Religious Affairs, with the rank of minister. Later, on 22 August 2013, he was appointed to his former post as Minister of Security, replacing Noureddine Adam.
