= Mélé =

- Location in the Central African Republic
- Coordinates: 9°43′9″N 21°35′24″E
- Country: Central African Republic
- Prefecture: Vakaga
- Sub-prefecture: Birao
- Commune: Ouandja
- Time zone: UTC + 1

Mélé is a village located in Vakaga Prefecture, Central African Republic.

== History ==
In 1962, Mélé had a population of 249 people.

During Central African Republic Bush War, Mélé was under control of UFDR.

Around 2009, 40-48 Janjaweed militias besieged Mélé to demand the villagers pay compensation of about 14 million CFA for unfair killing. The villagers agreed to pay the compensation of 10 million CFA and Janjaweed lifted the siege.

On 10 April 2011, a clash broke out in Mélé between UFDR and CPJP. As a result, the villagers sought refuge in Chad and Tiringoulou.

== Education ==
There is one school in the village.

== Healthcare ==
Mélé has one public health post.
