= Noureddine Adam =

Central African warlord (born 1970)

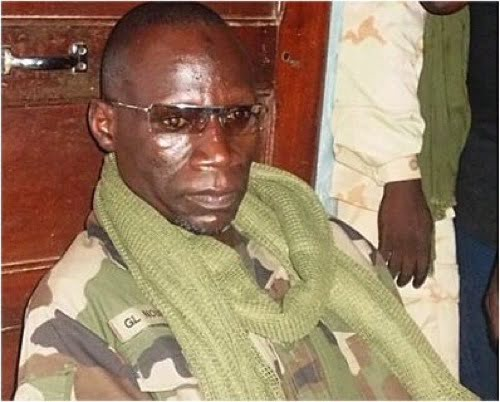
- Nourredine Adam in April 2018
- Born: January 1, 1970 (age 56); N'Délé, Central African Republic
- Military career
- Allegiance: Popular Front for the Rebirth of Central African Republic
- Service years: 2014–present
- Conflicts: Central African Republic Civil War; Sudanese civil war (2023-present): Battle of Nyala (WIA)

Signature
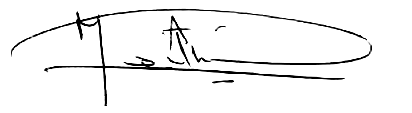

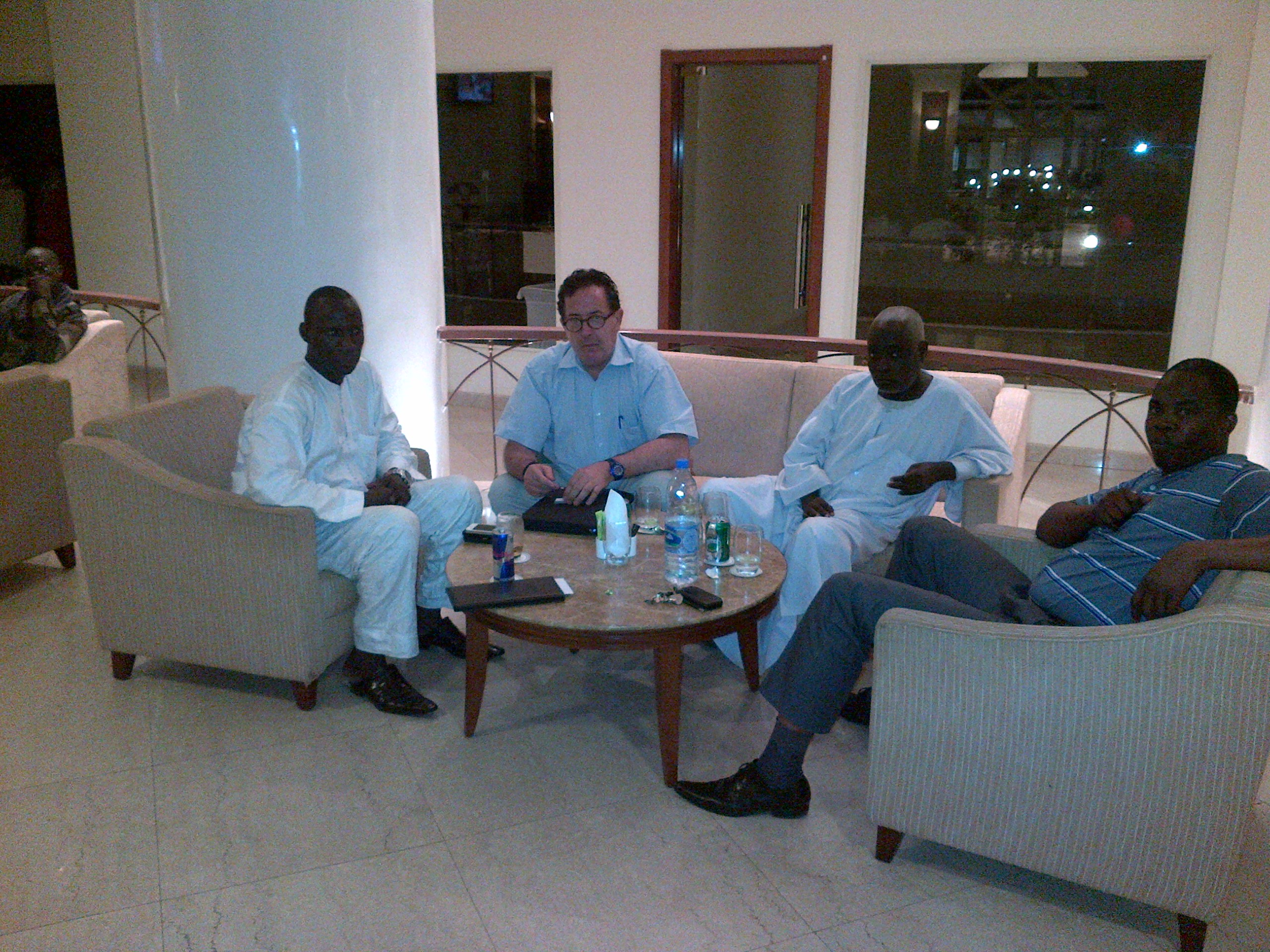
Nourredine Adam with Ambassador Bernard Leclerc in Bangui

Noureddine Adam (born 1970) is a Central African rebel leader and warlord who is the leader of the Popular Front for the Rebirth of Central African Republic (FPRC) rebel group in the Central African Republic Civil War. He was sanctioned by the United Nations Security Council in May 2014, and was indicted by the International Criminal Court in July 2022 as a suspect of crimes against humanity and war crimes.

== Early career ==
An ethnic Runga, he was born in 1970 in N'Délé. His father was an imam who served as the leader of the Muslim community in Miskine neighborhood of Bangui. His mother was a Chadian national. After completing secondary school, Adam was trained in Sudan and then in Egypt, where he graduated from the police academy in Cairo in the 1990s after spending 10 years in Egypt. After that, he was trained by the Israeli Special Forces for six months and then settled for a year in Bangui where he was assigned to the Central Office for the Suppression of Banditism (OCRB). During the early 2000s, he was hired as a bodyguard for dignitaries in various Persian Gulf countries. From 2003 to 2009, he stayed in the UAE and was a bodyguard of President Zayed bin Sultan Al Nahyan. In 2009, he returned to Central African Republic and joined the CPJP rebel group. Following the disappearance of Charles Massi in 2010, he became the leader of CPJP.

== Military career ==
He was second in command to Michel Djotodia of the Séléka coalition of rebels. In March 2013, he played a decisive role in the final offensive in Bangui, which overthrew then incumbent President François Bozizé. After seizing power, President Djotodia appointed him as Minister of Public Security on 31 March 2013 but he was dismissed on 22 August 2013 and appointed national security adviser. After Séléka was officially disbanded in September 2013, Ex-Séléka fighters formed new militias with the largest being FPRC, which was formed in May 2014 and initially led by Djotodia. He was sanctioned by the United Nations Security Council resolution 2134 on 9 May 2014 for: engaging in or providing support for acts that undermine the peace, stability or security of CAR and involving in diamond trafficking between CAR and Chad. As leader of FPRC, Noureddine Adam declared the autonomous Republic of Logone or Dar El Kuti on 14 December 2015 and intended Bambari as the capital, with the transitional government denouncing the declaration and the UN peacekeeping mission MINUSCA stating it will use force against any separatist attempt. By late 2016, the civil war was largely fighting between FPRC and a rival ex-Séléka faction called the Union for Peace in the Central African Republic (UPC) led by Ali Darassa.

On 17 December 2020, an FPRC faction led by Noureddine Adam joined the Coalition of Patriots for Change, while the faction led by Abdoulaye Hissène remained committed to the 2019 peace agreement.

On 28 July 2022, the International Criminal Court (ICC) made public an arrest warrant against Adam as a suspect of crimes against humanity and war crimes. In August 2023 he was injured during the Battle of Nyala while fighting on the side of Rapid Support Forces.
