= Logone Occidental =

Logone Occidental may refer to:

- Logone Occidental Prefecture
- Logone Occidental Region
