= Elisabeth Blanche Olofio =

Elizabeth Blanche Olofio
- Born: Elizabeth Blanche Olofio
- Citizenship: Central African Republic
- Occupation: Radio journalist
- Employer: Radio Be Oko

Elizabeth Blanche Olofio was a Central African Republic radio journalist who was injured on January 8, 2013 when rebels stormed a radio station in Bambari during the Central African Republic conflict.

== Biography ==
Journalist Elisabeth Blanche Olofio, employed by Radio Be Oko in the Central African Republic.

== Death and legacy ==
Elisabeth Blanche Olofio’s death was initially misreported; however, she later succumbed to injuries sustained during the original attack.

Sparked by this event, Reporters Without Borders signed an open letter appealing to the government and the international community to comply with and enforce the right to information and to protect journalists.
