= Guen =

- Location in the Central African Republic
- Coordinates: 4.7934°N 16.6165°E
- Country: Central African Republic
- Prefecture: Mambéré
- Sub-prefecture: Gadzi
- Commune: Topia

Guen is a village in the Mambéré Prefecture, Central African Republic.

== History ==
Anti-balaka entered a Muslim neighborhood in the village and shot the people who fled, including children, on 1 February 2014. They also looted Muslims' properties. Twenty-seven people were killed on the 1 February attack. Anti-balaka controlled Guen on 5 February 2014.

Torrential rain fell in Guen on 27 January 2023, resulting in 400 houses collapsing.

== Economy ==
There is a weekly market in the village.
