= Logone Oriental =

Logone Oriental may refer to the following divisions of Chad:

- Logone Oriental (prefecture)
- Logone Oriental (region)
