= Zande =

Zande may refer to:

- Zande people, of north central Africa
- Zande language, the language of the Azande people
- Zande, Belgium
- Xande, Zande in the NES fan translation, a major antagonist of Final Fantasy III
