= Hassan Al Habib =

Hassan Al Habib, also known by the aliases Wata and HA, was a spokesman for a faction of the Convention of Patriots for Justice and Peace (French: Convention des Patriotes pour la Justice et la Paix, CPJP), a rebel militia in the Central African Republic. He was killed by the CAR government on 19 September 2012.

Al Habib had also once been the second lieutenant of Jean Paul Ngoupandé, head of the CAR's National Unity Party (French: Parti de l’Unité Nationale PUN).
