= Gadzi =

Coordinates: 4°47′N 16°42′E

- sub-prefectures
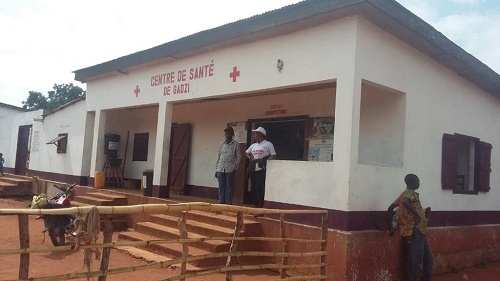
- Health center in Gadzi, 2022

- Location in Central African Republic
- Country: Central African Republic
- Prefecture: Mambéré

Government
  - Sub-Prefect: Lucien Yika

Gadzi is a sub-prefecture in the Central African Republic.

== History ==
In 2002, the locality becomes chief town of one of the seven sub-prefectures of Mambéré-Kadéï, resulting from a division of the sub-prefecture of Carnot. In April 2022 series of intercommunal clashes involving 3R rebels and pro-government faction of Anti-balaka led to dozens of deaths and displacement of more than 1,000 people in Gadzi.

== Administration ==
The sub-prefecture is made up of the two communes of Topia and Mbali. The town of Gadzi has 6,500 inhabitants in 2014 and depends on the municipality of Topia.
