= Nicolas Tiangaye =

Central African politician and lawyer (1956–2026)

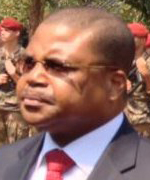

Prime Minister of the Central African Republic
- In office 17 January 2013 – 10 January 2014
- President: François Bozizé; Michel Djotodia (Transitional from 18 August 2013)
- Preceded by: Faustin-Archange Touadéra
- Succeeded by: André Nzapayeké

Personal details
- Born: 13 September 1956 Bocaranga, Ubangi-Shari (now Central African Republic)
- Died: 16 November 2026 (aged 70) Bangui, Central African Republic
- Party: Independent

Nicolas Tiangaye (13 September 1956 – 16 November 2026) was a Central African politician and lawyer who was Prime Minister of the Central African Republic from 17 January 2013 until his resignation on 10 January 2014. He was President of the National Transitional Council from 2003 to 2005.

Following a peace agreement between the government and rebels, Tiangaye was designated by the opposition and the rebels as their choice for the post of Prime Minister in January 2013. He stepped down (alongside President Michel Djotodia) on 10 January 2014.

== Early life and career ==
Tiangaye was born at Bocaranga on 13 September 1956. He became a lawyer. In 1986, Tiangaye was one of three Central African lawyers selected by the deposed emperor Jean-Bedél Bokassa to defend him at his trial. He was also a defense lawyer for François Bozizé in 1989 when Bozizé was accused of plotting against the government. Bozizé was acquitted. Years later, after Tiangaye and Bozizé had become political opponents, Tiangaye said about the case that he "was doing [his] duty as a lawyer" and that he did not regret defending Bozizé.

He served as President of the Central African Human Rights League (LCDH) from its foundation in 1991 until 2004. He was a defense lawyer for the Rwandan politician Jean-Paul Akayesu at the International Criminal Tribunal for Rwanda in 1996; Akayesu was convicted of genocide. Tiangaye was also a defense lawyer for Jean-Jacques Demafouth, a former Central African defense minister when the latter was put on trial for allegedly plotting a coup against President Ange-Félix Patassé in 2001; Demafouth was acquitted in October 2002. During Patassé's presidency, Tiangaye was at one point offered the post of Prime Minister, but he declined.

After François Bozizé seized power in March 2003, Tiangaye was designated as one of the 98 members of the National Transitional Council (CNT), which was established to act as a transitional legislative body; he was included on the council as a representative of a human rights organization, due to his role as President of the LCDH. He was then elected as President of the CNT on 14 June 2003. In that post, he helped draft the 2004 constitution; according to Tiangaye, Bozizé was displeased by the constitution's limit of two presidential terms and was consequently unhappy with Tiangaye.

== Political career ==
The CNT remained in place for two years, during the transitional period leading up to the March–May 2005 presidential and parliamentary election. Tiangaye stood as a parliamentary candidate, but following the second round of voting in May 2005, the electoral commission announced that Tiangaye had been narrowly defeated in his constituency by a pro-Bozizé Kwa Na Kwa candidate, and rioting erupted among Tiangaye's supporters in Bangui. Tiangaye called for calm "to avoid a bloodbath." Later, he claimed that the vote in his constituency was rigged against him on Bozizé's orders. Others who were hostile to Tiangaye argued that he lacked genuine popularity and was better suited to the courtroom.

In 2010, Tiangaye was Spokesman of the Forces of Change Collective, which was composed of opposition parties as well as former rebels, at a time when the government was attempting to organize a presidential and parliamentary election. The Collective wanted the vote to be delayed beyond the date decreed by President Bozizé. Speaking on 9 April 2010, Tiangaye declared that the opposition would boycott the election in the absence of a postponement, saying that if the vote was held as planned in May 2010, it would not be credible due to inadequate conditions. Later in the month, on 29 April 2010, Bozizé accepted the need to delay the election until a time when "all the parties involved in these elections, including the international community, will be ready."

=== Prime minister ===
In December 2012, a coalition of rebel groups called Séléka mounted an offensive against the army and quickly seized control of a large portion of the Central African Republic, threatening Bangui, the capital, and putting the government of President Bozizé in a desperate situation. At peace talks held in Libreville in January 2013, Tiangaye headed the political opposition's delegation; the government and the rebels also sent delegations. An agreement was reached on 11 January 2013, allowing Bozizé to finish his term as president but also requiring him to accept a prime minister chosen by his opponents, along with a government that would include the political opposition and rebels; Bozizé would not be allowed to dismiss the new prime minister from his post.

On 13 January 2013, Tiangaye announced that he had been unanimously selected by opposition leaders as their choice for the post of prime minister. However, Bozizé hesitated to appoint Tiangaye without the approval of the Séléka rebels, causing a short delay. The Séléka rebels announced on 15 January 2013 that they endorsed the opposition's choice.

President Bozizé appointed Tiangaye as Prime Minister in a ceremony held in Bangui on 17 January 2013. Tiangaye declared that there was "hard work" ahead, but also "peace on the horizon"; he said that "the government must address urgently ... the pacification of the country and the restructuring of the army". He stressed the importance of cooperation and said that he had "no personal problem with the president." For his part, Bozizé wished Tiangaye good luck.

According to the terms of the peace agreement, a new parliamentary election was intended to be held after one year, while the next presidential election would be held as originally scheduled in 2016; both Bozizé and Tiangaye would be barred from standing as presidential candidates at that time.

Negotiations regarding the composition of the national unity government followed Tiangaye's appointment. Eventually, the government's composition was announced on 3 February 2013. Ministerial portfolios were divided between Bozizé supporters, the rebels, and the political opposition; notably, rebel leader Michel Djotodia was appointed First Deputy Prime Minister for National Defense. Tiangaye himself was assigned the finance portfolio.

The peace agreement unraveled in March 2013, as Séléka resumed seizing towns, accusing Bozizé of failing to keep his promises. After days of fighting, the rebels captured Bangui on 24 March 2013, forcing Bozizé to flee the country, and Djotodia was declared President. Djotodia said that there would be a three-year transitional period and that Tiangaye would continue to serve as Prime Minister.

Djotodia promptly suspended the constitution and dissolved the government, as well as the National Asssembly. He then reappointed Tiangaye as Prime Minister on 27 March 2013. Tiangaye commanded substantial respect among those who opposed Bozizé, political parties and rebels alike, as well as international observers.

A new government headed by Tiangaye, with 34 members, was appointed on 31 March 2013; Djotodia retained the defense portfolio. There were nine members of Séléka in the government, along with eight representatives of the parties that had opposed Bozizé, while only one member of the government was associated with Bozizé. 16 positions were given to representatives of civil society. The former opposition parties were unhappy with the composition of the government; on 1 April 2013, they declared that they would boycott the government to protest its domination by Séléka. They argued that the 16 positions given to representatives of civil society were in fact "handed over to Séléka allies disguised as civil society activists".

Sectarian violence escalated in the months after Séléka took power, and by late 2013 Djotodia faced severe pressure from regional leaders and the international community due to his apparent inability to control the situation. By that point, the relationship between Tiangaye and Djotodia was characterized as "notoriously bad". Under pressure from regional leaders who felt the situation was untenable, Tiangaye and Djotodia both resigned at a summit held in N'Djamena on 10 January 2014.

=== Post–prime ministerial career ===
After his resignation as prime minister, Tiangaye became dean of the Central African Bar and continued his legal career. He defended Crépin M'Boli-Goumba and Joseph Martin Figueira. In 2020, He ran as the presidential candidate at the 2020–21 Central African general election from the Republican Convention for Social Progress and received 2,163 votes. He then joined the opposition bloc (COD2020) in 2022 and became its spokesperson. Later, he became the member of The Republican Bloc for the Defense of the Constitution. As an opposition, he was against the 2023 Central African constitutional referendum because it would pave the way for Faustin-Archange Touadéra to run for a third term as president. On 13 November 2026, he organized the protests over economic issues and high living costs.

== Death ==
Tiangaye died in Bangui on 16 November 2026, at the age of 70. According to the Corbeau News Centrafrique, Tiangaye was alone at this office and then collapsed and lost consciousness. His secretary discovered him in critical condition and soon called an ambulance to take him to a hospital, where he died after arriving.

Political offices
Preceded by Faustin-Archange Touadéra	Prime Minister of the Central African Republic; 2013–2014	Succeeded by André Nzapayeké
