= Damara, Central African Republic =

Damara
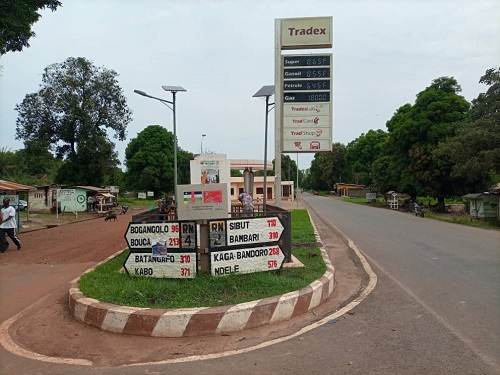
- Damara town entrance

- Location in Central African Republic
- Coordinates: 4°58′N 18°42′E
- Country: Central African Republic
- Prefecture: Ombella-M'Poko

Government
  - Sub-Prefect: Eugénie Bally
  - Mayor: Germaine Mandazou

Damara is a town located in the Central African Republic prefecture of Ombella-M'Poko. It is located about an hour from the national capital, Bangui.

== History ==
In March 2013, rebels from the Séléka Coalition (Séléka means "alliance" in the Sango language) overtook a checkpoint in Damara. Part of the 2012-2013 Central African Republic conflict, the rebels claimed that President of the Central African Republic François Bozizé had violated the terms of a January cease-fire agreement. After storming the Damara checkpoint, however, the rebels were prevented from taking Bangui by a helicopter attack. "The helicopter opened fire on the column, forcing it to disperse... The rebels have not reached Bangui," said a senior military analyst quoted by Reuters.
