= Runga people =

Ethnic group in Central Africa

Runga
Total population
- 96,000

Regions with significant populations
- Chad: 66,000
- Central African Republic: 30,000

Languages
- Runga, Chadian Arabic, French, Sango

Religion
- Islam (mainly Sunni)

The Runga are an ethnic group in Chad as well as the Central African Republic, where they are found in the north and northeast of the country. The majority of the Runga are Muslim.

== Organization ==
The Runga are distinguished between the Runga who speak Chadian Arabic and the Runga-Aiki who speak Aiki (and often also Arabic). Despite this linguistic distinction, there is a great cultural homogeneity.

== Notable people ==
- Mahamat Kamoun, former prime minister of Central African Republic
- Noureddine Adam, Central African warlord and ICC fugitive
- Abdoulaye Hissène, Central African warlord
