= Convention of Patriots for Justice and Peace =

Rebel group in the Central African Republic

The Convention of Patriots for Justice and Peace (CPJP) is a rebel group in the Central African Republic (CAR), which was involved in fighting in the Central African Republic Bush War starting in 2004. On June 12, 2011, the CPJP signed a ceasefire agreement with the government of CAR.

Later, however, the CPJP joined the Séléka alliance which overthrew president François Bozizé in March 2013.

== 2012 peace agreement ==
On August 25, 2012, the CPJP, represented by Abdoulaye Hissène, signed a peace agreement with the government following up on the 2011 ceasefire.

== Fundamental CPJP ==
A faction of the CPJP rejected the peace agreement and split off under the leadership of Hassan Al Habib. It goes by the name of "Fundamental CPJP". On September 15, 2012, the group attacked the towns of Sibut, Damara and Dekoa, which was the beginning of the 2012 Central African Republic rebellion.
