= Popular Front for the Rebirth of Central African Republic =

Rebel group

- Front populaire pour la renaissance de la Centrafrique
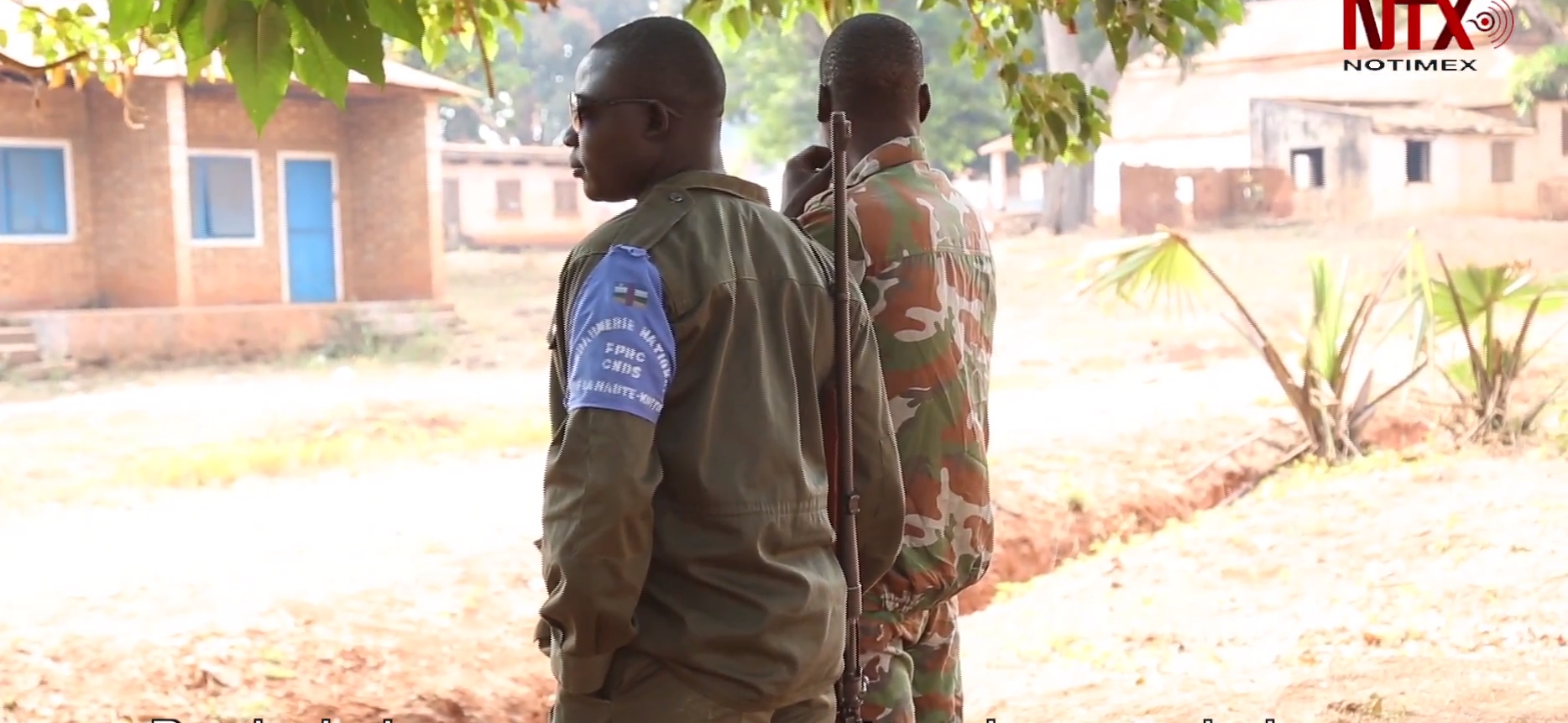
- FPRC fighters in Bria in 2018
- Leaders: Noureddine Adam (pro-CPC faction); Abdoulaye Hissène (pro-government faction)
- Dates active: 10 July 2014–
- Split from: Séléka
- Headquarters: N'Délé
- Active regions: Northern part of Central African Republic
- Size: 12,000 (2018 self-claim)
- Part of: Coalition of Patriots for Change (since December 2020)
- Wars: Central African Republic Civil War (2012–present)

Territories under control of FPRC

Popular Front for the Rebirth of the Central African Republic (FPRC, French: Front populaire pour la renaissance de la Centrafrique) is a rebel group in the Central African Republic which controls areas of the northern part of the country, until 2021 based in N'Délé.

The FPRC operates a parallel state in the northern part of the Central African Republic named the Republic of Logone. They have their own police, gendarmes, prisons, and military bases. They also collect taxes and levies. They profit from gold and diamond mines in the areas they control, including the Ndassima mine, which they jointly control with the Union for Peace in the Central African Republic.

== History ==
The FPRC was formed on 10 July 2014 in Birao, consolidating the member forces' control over the northern prefectures. They were one of the parties of the February 2019 peace deal. In September 2019, they lost control of Birao. On 17 February 2020 FPRC fighters tried to recapture Birao by attacking local MINUSCA forces. Their attack was repelled and 12 fighters were killed.

On 17 December 2020, an FPRC faction led by Noureddine Adam joined the Coalition of Patriots for Change, while the faction led by Abdoulaye Hissene remained committed to the 2019 peace agreement. Pro-CPC forces of general Mahamat Salleh took control of Bakouma on 31 December 2020 and then Bangassou on 3 January 2021.

== Republic of Logone ==
Republic of Logone: République de Logone (French)
- 2015–2021
- Flag

- Territories claimed by Logone
- Status: Unrecognized proto-state
- Capital: Kaga-Bandoro
- Largest city: Bria
- Common languages: French · Arabic · Sango
- Government: Republic
- Leader
  - 2015–2021: Noureddine Adam
- Spokesman
  - 2015–2021: Maouloud Moussa
- History
  - Independence declaration from the Central African Republic: 14 December 2015
  - Kaga-Bandoro was recaptured by government forces: 10 April 2021

Area
  - Total: 217,101 km^{2} (83,823 sq mi)

Population
  - 2003 census: 297,861
- Currency: Central African CFA franc
- Time zone: UTC+1 (WAT)

Territories under control of FPRC in 2017, before government forces made major advances

The Republic of Logone (French: République de Logone), also known as Dar El-Kuti (French: Dar el-Kouti), is a partially realized, self-declared autonomous region and proto-state internationally recognised as part of the Central African Republic. It was formed by the Muslim rebel movement Popular Front for the Rebirth of Central African Republic (FPRC) with support of other armed groups on 14 December 2015. The states of Republic of Logone are Bamingui-Bangoran, Vakaga and Haute-Kotto.

In March 2013, during the Central African Republic Civil War which began a year earlier, the Muslim Séléka rebels forced the Christian president of the Central African Republic François Bozizé from his office, resulting in violence from the Christian anti-balaka militias. The UN sent in MINUSCA troops and scheduled a constitutional referendum for 13 December 2015 and national elections on 27 December in order to stabilize the country. However, Noureddine Adam, the leader of the Popular Front for the Rebirth of Central African Republic (FPRC), one of the four Muslim Séléka militias, abstained from the scheduled elections. In his view, Muslims and Christians could no longer live together in one country.

On 14 December 2015, Adam's spokesman, Maouloud Moussa, declared the autonomous Republic of Logone in the northeast of the country. He explained that they wanted first to achieve autonomy within the Central African Republic and eventually absolute independence. Louisa Lombard, a professor of anthropology at the Yale University, explained that it is possible that declaration of a new republic was a negotiating tactic for upcoming elections or a method for increasing influence, and that the rebels did not really believe that it is feasible to create a new state. Besides FPRC the independence of Republic of Logone has been supported by MPC, RPRC and MLCJ armed groups.

On 10 April 2021, Kaga-Bandoro was recaptured by government forces.

=== Flag ===
The flag of the Republic of Logone consists of three horizontal stripes of yellow (for the gold of the North), black (that the north was abandoned by the government in Bangui) and green (for the fertility of the land). In the centre of the black strip is a black star that stands for the struggle of the people in the north for their self-determination.
