= United Nations Security Council Resolution 1230 =

UN Security Council Resolution 1230
- Date: 26 February 1999
- Meeting no.: 3,984
- Code: S/RES/1230 (Document)
- Subject: The situation in Central African Republic
- Voting summary: 15 voted for; None voted against; None abstained
- Result: Adopted

Security Council composition
- Permanent members: China; France; Russia; United Kingdom; United States
- Non-permanent members: Argentina; Bahrain; Brazil; Canada; Gabon; Gambia; Malaysia; Namibia; Netherlands; Slovenia

United Nations Security Council resolution 1230, adopted unanimously on 26 February 1999, after reaffirming resolutions 1125 (1997), 1136 (1997), 1152 (1998), 1155 (1998), 1159 (1998), 1182 (1998) and 1201 (1998) regarding the situation in the Central African Republic, the Council extended the mandate of the United Nations Mission in the Central African Republic (MINURCA) until 15 November 1999, expressing its intention to fully terminate it by that date.

Legislative elections were held in the Central African Republic on 22 November and 18 December 1998. The Council stressed the need for the restructuring of the Central African armed forces (FACA) and the necessity of a secure and stable environment conducive to the holding of elections and economic recovery. In this regard, it urged the Government of the Central African Republic to set a date for presidential elections as soon as possible.

After extending MINURCA's mandate, the Council expressed its intention to commence the reduction of the operation 15 days after the holding of the presidential elections with a view to terminating the mission by 15 November 1999. It would conduct reviews every 45 days on the mandate of MINURCA. All parties in the country were urged to take measures to resolve the current political impasse and the government in particular was requested to establish an electoral commission for the presidential elections. MINURCA's support was necessary for this process and it was asked to recognise the role of the United Nations Development Programme (UNDP) in the co-ordination of the elections. It was also asked to supervise the destruction of confiscated weapons and ammunition.

The Central African authorities were urged to implement the following policies:

(a) adopt draft laws and decrees regarding national defence and the structure of defence forces by 15 April 1999;
(b) limit the mission of FORSDIR to the protection of those Institutions and of high-level authorities;
(c) continue to support the demilitarisation and reintegration programme of the UNDP;
(d) to establish an implementation programme to restructure the FACA, including geographical and multi-ethnic recruitment and improved working conditions, by 1 April 1999.

The authorities were also asked to refrain from intervening in foreign conflicts, and that economic recovery and reconstruction were its main priorities. Finally, the Secretary-General Kofi Annan was requested to examine the role of the United Nations in the country after the MINURCA peacekeeping mission had left.

== See also ==
- History of the Central African Republic
- List of United Nations Security Council Resolutions 1201 to 1300 (1998–2000)
