= Bangui Agreements =

1997 peace accord in the Central African Republic

The Bangui Agreements (also Bangui Accords, Accords de Bangui, and Bangui Peace Accords) are a 1997 negotiated peace accord in the Central African Republic (CAR). The accord was drawn up in Bangui to bring an end to the 1990s conflict between government and rebel forces. It was signed by the Patassé government, opposition parties and religious groups. The agreement envisaged several steps to sort out the views of various political factions, reorganize the defense establishment, and implement reforms in the country to improve its economy.

== Prelude ==
In 1995, several opposition movements (FPP, MDD PSD, FC and ADP) joined together and formed the Conseil Démocratique des Partis de l'Opposition CODEPO. CODEPO staged a rally against the government demanding that unpaid salaries for public servants and army personnel be paid in arrears. Three successive mutinies occurred in 1996 against the Ange-Félix Patassé's Government by some of the members of the country's armed forces, due to non payment of salaries, labour issues and ethnic differences resulting in a crisis. One of the mutinies involved approximately 200 soldiers who demanded salary increases and the abdication of Ange-Félix Patassé. The aftermath led the French troops stationed in the country to suppress the rebellion and restore order. In December, at the 19th Summit Meeting of Heads of State and Government of France and Africa, Patassé asked the Presidents of Gabon, Burkina Faso, Chad and Mali to mediate a truce between government and rebel forces.

== Signing ==
In January 1997, the Bangui Agreements were signed by the Patasse government, opposition parties and religious groups. An international committee composed of a member of each from the concerned state was formed to monitor the implementation of the Bangui Agreements.

== Aftermath ==
Michel Gbezera-Bria was appointed prime minister, and a new government was formed after signing of the Bangui Agreements. However, this did not bring about an end to the political unrest. The UN Resolution 1125 was adopted in August 1997 due to concern with the situation in CAR; it authorised the MISAB to be deployed for three months. In October, the French Government withdrew its army from Bangui and also closed the military base in Bouar. Resolution 1136 was adopted in November 1997, which included a recall of Resolution 1125 and an authorization of MISAB's continuation for three more months. Resolution 1152 was adopted in February 1998 with reaffirmation of Resolutions 1125 and 1136, as well as authorization to continue MISAB until 16 March 1998. Resolution 1155 was adopted in March 1998, with a re-affirmation of Resolutions 1125, 1136, and 1152, as well as authorization to continue MISAB until 27 March 1998. In April 1998, the UN intervened with Resolution 1159 which established the United Nations Mission to the Central African Republic mission (MINURCA) with a 1,350 strong peace keeping force, aiming to bring about peace among the various warring groups and also facilitating free elections to the legislature. Resolution 1182 was adopted in July 1998; it reaffirmed Resolutions 1125, 1136, 1152, 1155, and 1159, and extended MINURCA through 25 October 1998. Resolution 1201 was adopted in October 1998; it reaffirmed Resolutions 1125, 1136, 1152, 1155, 1159, and 1182 regarding the situation in the Central African Republic, and extended the MINURCA mandate until 28 February 1999. Elections were held during November-December 1998 under the auspices of the United Nations peacekeeping force, hoping that the Bangui Agreements would become effective. But the opposition boycotted the Assembly after one of their members defected to presidential camp. Resolution 1230 was adopted in February 1999; it reaffirmed Resolutions 1125, 1136, 1152, 1155, 1159, 1182, and 1201, extended the MINURCA mandate through 15 November 1999, which would be its termination date. Elections were held again in September 1999 with Patassé returned to power as president. Resolution 1271 was adopted in October 1999; it reaffirmed Resolutions 1159, 1201, and 1231, extended the MINURCA mandate until 15 February 2000, and described a transition from a peacekeeping operation to a post-conflict peace-building presence. A semblance of peace returned and the UN peace keeping force withdrew from CAR in February 2000.

=== United Nations Resolutions ===
Number	Adopted	Remarks
1125	6 August 1997	Expressing concern at the situation in CAR, the resolution extended the period of MISAB initially for three months. The cost of the operations would be borne by the participating states (Burkina Faso, Chad, Gabon], Mali, Senegal and Tago)
1136	6 November 1997	Authorises continuation of MISAB. The Secretary-General Kofi Annan was asked to establish a fund in which Member States could financially contribute to MISAB.
1152	5 February 1998	Extended till 16 March 1998. Secretary-General intended to appoint a Special Representative to assist the parties in implementing the agreements.
1155	16 March 1998	Extends MISAB mandate until 27 March 1998. On that date, the Security Council was to take decision regarding the establishment of a peacekeeping mission in the country.
1159	27 March 1998	Established the United Nations Mission in the Central African Republic (MINURCA). Extended mandate till 15 July 1988. CAR was asked to conclude a Status of Forces Agreement with Secretary General before 25 April 1988.
1182	14 July 1998	Extends MINURCA mandate by 3 months and asked CAR to adopt plans to restructure its army and organise elections.
1201	15 October 1998	Extends MINURCA mandate to 28 February 1999 with intent to terminate MINURCA with a reduction of its size no later than 15 January 1999.
1230	26 February 1999	Extends MINURCA mandate up to 15 November 1999and expresses its intention to fully terminate it by that date
1271	22 October 1999	Extended the mandate to 15 February 2000 with a view to examine its transition from a peacekeeping operation to a post-conflict peace-building presence. A small delegation was to be dispatched by the Secretary-General to the capital Bangui to determine the modalities of a continuation of the United Nations presence in the CAR after 15 February 2000.
