= United Nations Security Council Resolution 1201 =

UN Security Council Resolution 1201
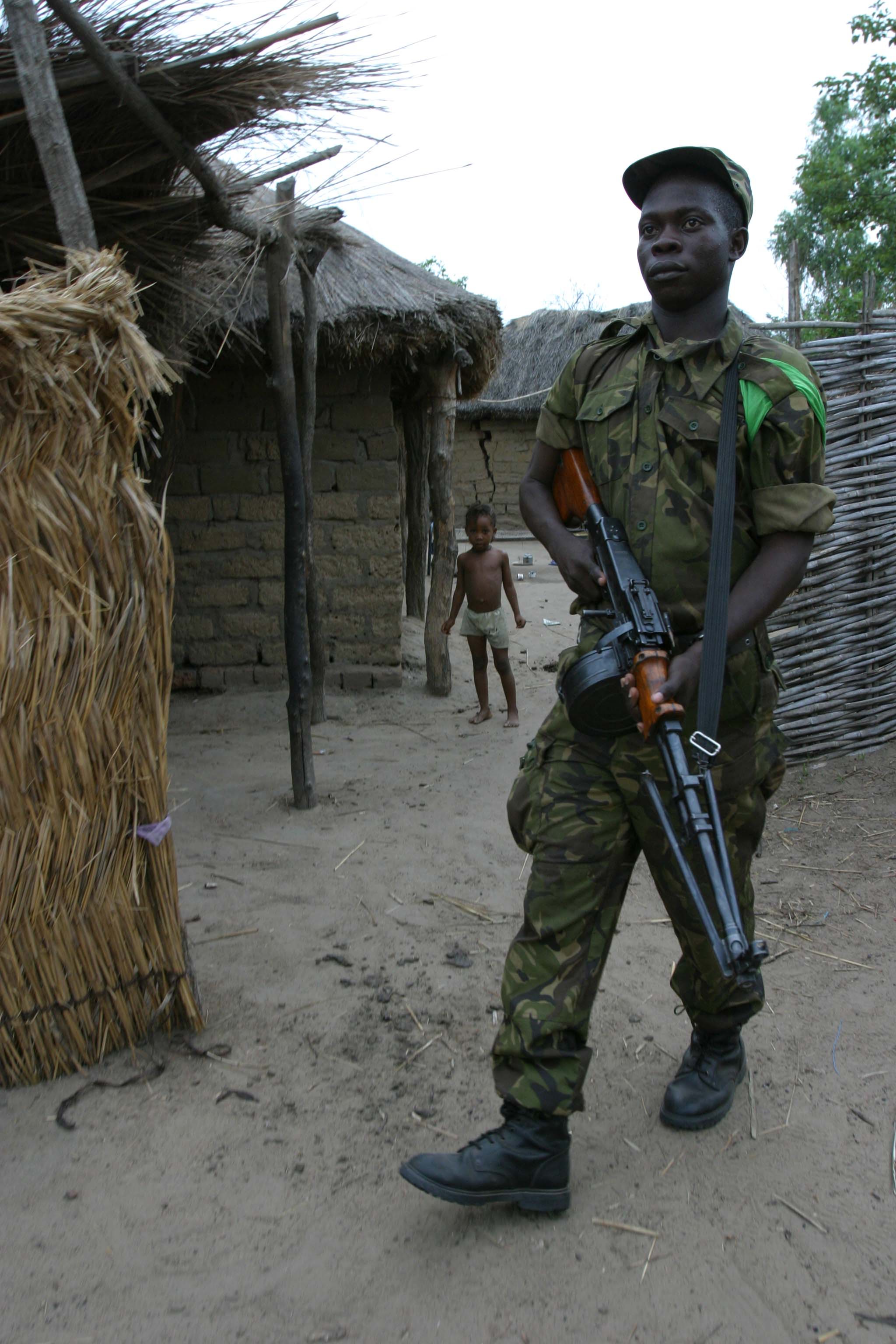
- Soldier from the Central African Republic in Birao
- Date: 15 October 1998
- Meeting no.: 3,935
- Code: S/RES/1201 (Document)
- Subject: The situation in Central African Republic
- Voting summary: 15 voted for; None voted against; None abstained
- Result: Adopted

Security Council composition
- Permanent members: China; France; Russia; United Kingdom; United States
- Non-permanent members: Bahrain; Brazil; Costa Rica; Gabon; Gambia; Japan; Kenya; Portugal; Slovenia; Sweden

United Nations Security Council resolution 1201, adopted unanimously on 15 October 1998, after reaffirming resolutions 1125 (1997), 1136 (1997), 1152 (1998), 1155 (1998), 1159 (1998) and 1182 (1998) regarding the situation in the Central African Republic, the Council extended the mandate of the United Nations Mission in the Central African Republic (MINURCA) until 28 February 1999.

The Central African Republic had made considerable progress in implementing the Bangui Agreements and major political and economic reforms. There was also an operational plan for the organisation of elections, which were to be supported by the MINURCA mission. The Council welcomed the decision of the authorities in the country to hold elections on 22 November and 13 December 1998 and the mandate of MINURCA was extended to support these accordingly. The mission could transport electoral materials, equipment and observers to and from electoral sites and conduct limited observations of the first and second round of the elections.

The Secretary-General Kofi Annan had recommended in his report to provide security during the election process. 150 personnel from the Central African Armed Forces were deployed and operating under rules applicable to MINURCA. Meanwhile, Member States were urged to provide technical, financial and logistical support to help assist the organisation of the elections.

Finally, the secretary-general was instructed to report to the council by 20 December 1998 concerning the mandate of MINURCA, the implementation of various agreements and developments in the Central African Republic. It expressed its intention to terminate MINURCA by 28 February 1999 with a reduction of its size no later than 15 January 1999.

== See also ==
- History of the Central African Republic
- List of United Nations Security Council Resolutions 1201 to 1300 (1998–2000)
