= United Nations Security Council Resolution 1182 =

UN Security Council Resolution 1182
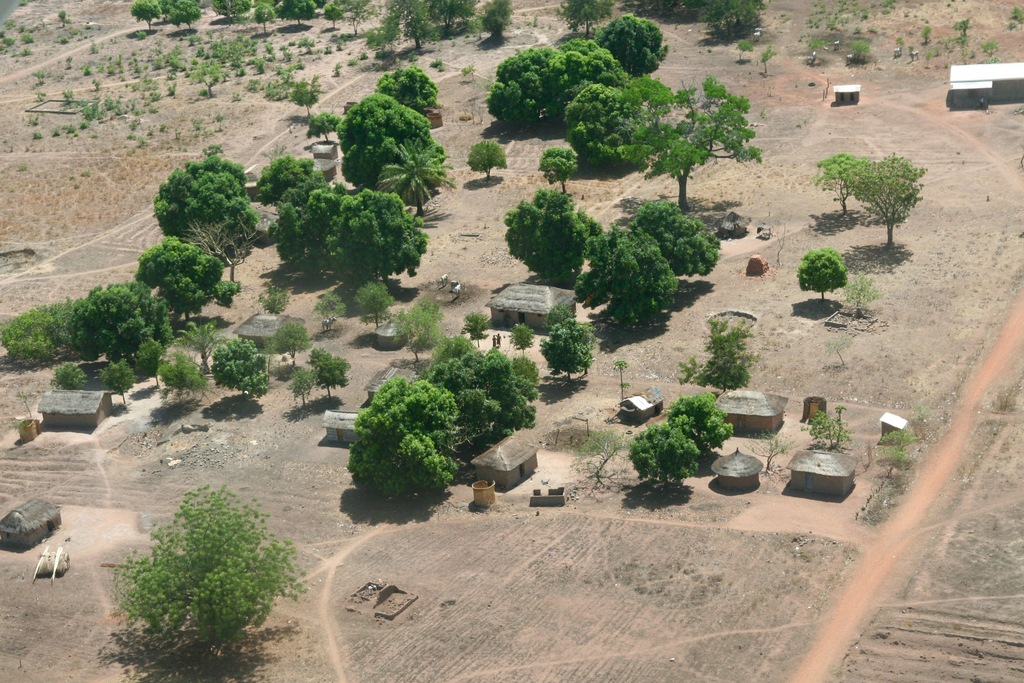
- Village in the Central African Republic viewed from above
- Date: 14 July 1998
- Meeting no.: 3,905
- Code: S/RES/1182 (Document)
- Subject: The situation in Central African Republic
- Voting summary: 15 voted for; None voted against; None abstained
- Result: Adopted

Security Council composition
- Permanent members: China; France; Russia; United Kingdom; United States
- Non-permanent members: Bahrain; Brazil; Costa Rica; Gabon; Gambia; Japan; Kenya; Portugal; Slovenia; Sweden

United Nations Security Council resolution 1182, adopted unanimously on 14 July 1998, after reaffirming resolutions 1125 (1997), 1136 (1997), 1152 (1998), 1155 (1998) and 1159 (1998) regarding the situation in the Central African Republic, the Council extended the mandate of the United Nations Mission in the Central African Republic (MINURCA) until 25 October 1998.

The Security Council noted that MINURCA was fully deployed in the Central African Republic. It stressed the importance of creating a stable and secure environment in order to hold free and fair elections, and welcomed the establishment of the Electoral Commission. The authorities in the country had to take steps towards implementing political, economic, social and security reforms which included co-operation with international financial institutions.

The resolution called upon the Government of the Central African Republic to adopt plans to restructure its army and organise elections. The support of the international community was essential in this process. It was recognised that MINURCA could conduct reconnaissance missions outside the capital Bangui and other tasks involving the security of United Nations personnel.

Finally, the Secretary-General Kofi Annan was asked to submit a report by 25 September 1998 on the implementation of the mandate of MINURCA and on the implementation of the Bangui Agreements.

== See also ==
- History of the Central African Republic
- List of United Nations Security Council Resolutions 1101 to 1200 (1997–1998)
