= United Nations Security Council Resolution 1271 =

UN Security Council Resolution 1271
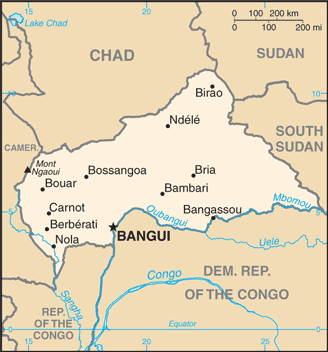
- The Central African Republic
- Date: 22 October 1999
- Meeting no.: 4,056
- Code: S/RES/1271 (Document)
- Subject: The situation in Central African Republic
- Voting summary: 15 voted for; None voted against; None abstained
- Result: Adopted

Security Council composition
- Permanent members: China; France; Russia; United Kingdom; United States
- Non-permanent members: Argentina; Bahrain; Brazil; Canada; Gabon; Gambia; Malaysia; Namibia; Netherlands; Slovenia

United Nations Security Council resolution 1271 was adopted unanimously on 22 October 1999, after reaffirming all resolutions on the situation in the Central African Republic, including resolutions 1159 (1998), 1201 (1998) and 1230 (1999). The Council extended the mandate of the United Nations Mission in the Central African Republic (MINURCA) until 15 February 2000 with a view to its transition from a peacekeeping operation to a post-conflict peace-building presence.

The Security Council was satisfied that presidential elections had taken place in the Central African Republic on 19 September 1999 and commended the support of MINURCA during this process. It recalled the importance of the political groups in the country working together for national reconciliation. Though MINURCA was due to terminate on 15 November 1999, the Central African government had requested that it extend its presence beyond that date.

The resolution extended MINURCA's mandate with a view to transforming its peacekeeping force to a post-conflict peace-building force and the Secretary-General Kofi Annan had recommended the military and civilian reduction be conducted in three stages. The government of the Central African Republic was urged to implement political, economic, social and security reforms; transfer the functions of MINURCA to its security and police forces; and complete with the restructuring of its military.

A small delegation dispatched by the Secretary-General to the capital Bangui would determine the modalities of a continuation of the United Nations presence in the Central African Republic after 15 February 2000. Finally, Kofi Annan was required to report by 15 January 2000 on the implementation of all aspects of the current resolution.

== See also ==
- History of the Central African Republic
- List of United Nations Security Council Resolutions 1201 to 1300 (1998–2000)
