= 2020 in the Central African Republic =

- Decades: 2000s; 2010s; 2020s
- See also: Other events of 2020; History of the Central African Republic

The following is a list of events of the year 2020 in the Central African Republic.

== Incumbents ==
- President: Faustin-Archange Touadéra
- Prime Minister: Firmin Ngrébada

== Events ==
Ongoing – COVID-19 pandemic in the Central African Republic

=== January ===
- January 24 – The Ministry of Health declared a national measles epidemic. Between February 2019 and January 2020, 3,600 people were infected while 53 others died.

=== February ===
- February 7 – Twenty-eight people were sentenced to 10 to 15 years of hard labor and five Christian militiamen to life terms for war crimes and crimes against humanity.

=== March ===
- March 14 – The first case of COVID-19 in the country was confirmed.
- March 15 – In a historic first, all Peace Corps volunteers in the country and worldwide were withdrawn.

=== April ===
- April 30 – At least 25 people were killed and 51 others wounded in clashes in the northeast of the country.

=== July ===
- July 13 – A U.N. Peacekeeper from Rwanda was killed in an ambush in Nana-Mambéré. The attack was allegedly carried out by the Return, Reclamation and Rehabilitation (3R) militia.
- July 25 – Former Central African Republic president François Bozizé announces his candidacy in the 2020 Central African general election.

=== December ===
- December 15 – Former president Francois Bozize accepts the court ruling that says he is not eligible for election and calls for unity among the opposition. There are 17 presidential candidates in the December 27 election.
- December 21 – Rwanda bolsters its security forces in CAR.
- December 22 – Rebels seize the city of Bambari, Ouaka.
- December 23 – Abdoulaziz Fall of the United Nations says the situation in Bambari is under control.
- December 26 – Three UN peacekeepers from Burundi are killed in Dekoa and Bakouma.
- December 27 – 2020 Central African general election
- December 30 – A coalition including five presidential candidates demands annulment of the election due to violence.

=== November ===
- November 1 – All Saints' Day, public holiday.

=== December ===
- December 1 – Republic Day, public holiday.
- December 25 – Christmas, public holiday.
- December 27 – 2020 Central African general election.

== See also ==
- 2020 in Middle Africa
- List of years in the Central African Republic
- 2020 in the Central African Republic
