= 2025 in the Central African Republic =

- Decades: 2000s; 2010s; 2020s
- See also: Other events of 2025; History of the Central African Republic

The following is a list of events of the year 2025 in the Central African Republic.

== Incumbents ==
- President: Faustin-Archange Touadéra
- Prime Minister: Félix Moloua

== Events ==
=== February ===
- 3 February – Five soldiers are killed in an attack by rebels in Kouki, Ouham.
- 25 February – Nine people are killed in an attack by members of the 3R militia in Nzoroh.

=== March ===
- 29 March – A UN peacekeeper from Kenya is killed in an ambush by the Azande Ani Kpi Gbe militia near Tabane.

=== June ===
- 20 June – A UN peacekeeper from Zambia is killed in an ambush by gunmen in Am-Sissia 1, near the border with Sudan.
- 26 June – At least 29 people are killed in an crowd crush caused by an exploding electricity transformer that triggers a panic at an examination centre for high school students in Bangui.

=== July ===
- 10 July – The Union for Peace in the Central African Republic formally dissolves itself in a ceremony in Bangui as part of a peace agreement, ending its rebellion against the central government.
- 16 July – Eleven people are killed in a shooting at the Ndassima gold mine controlled by the Wagner Group.
- 24 July – The International Criminal Court convicts Anti-balaka leaders Patrice-Edouard Ngaïssona and Alfred Yekatom of war crimes and crimes against humanity targeting Muslims during the Central African Republic Civil War and sentences them to 12 and 15 years' imprisonment respectively.

=== September ===
- 16 September – An armored personnel carrier falls into the Ombella M’poko River outside Bangui, killing five UN police officers from the Republic of the Congo.

=== November ===
- 14 November – The United Nations Security Council approves a one-year extension of the mandate of the United Nations Mission in the Central African Republic.

=== December ===
- 28 December – 2025 Central African general election: Faustin-Archange Touadéra is reelected to a third term as president with around 76% of the vote.

== Holidays ==
- 1 January – New Year's Day
- 29 March – Barthelemy Boganda Day
- 30 March – Korité
- 18 April – Easter Monday
- 1 May – Labour Day
- 9 May – Ascension Day
- 20 May – Whit Monday
- 6 June – Tabaski
- 30 June – General Prayer Day
- 13 August – Independence Day
- 15 August – Assumption Day
- 1 November – All Saints' Day
- 1 December – National Day
- 25 December – Christmas Day

== Deaths ==
- January 5: Joseph Bendounga, 70, lawyer and politician, mayor of Bangui (1997–2000).

== See also ==
- African Continental Free Trade Area
- Community of Sahel–Saharan States
