= Tsuruya =

Tsuruya (鶴屋) can refer to:

- Haruhi Suzumiya series character, see Tsuruya
- Tsuruya Golf, see Tsuruya Open
- Kōkei Tsuruya (* 1946), Japanese woodblock print artist
- Matsuya (department store), originally named Tsuruya
