= 2022 in the Central African Republic =

- Decades: 2000s; 2010s; 2020s
- See also: Other events of 2022; History of the Central African Republic

The following is a list of events of the year 2022 in the Central African Republic.

== Incumbents ==
- President: Faustin-Archange Touadéra
- Prime Minister: Félix Moloua

== Monthly events ==
Ongoing – COVID-19 pandemic in the Central African Republic, Central African Republic Civil War

- April 27 – The Central African Republic adopts bitcoin as legal tender, after its legislature unanimously approved the law.
- April 29 – Six soldiers and four Coalition of Patriots for Change rebels are killed during a shootout at a military outpost in Bakouma, Central African Republic.
- October 31 – A special court in the Central African Republic sentences three 3R militiamen to 20 years to life in prison for crimes against humanity, in what is considered a historic and first trial regarding the civil war.

== See also ==
- COVID-19 pandemic in Africa
- African Continental Free Trade Area
- Community of Sahel–Saharan States
