= 2021 in the Central African Republic =

- Decades: 2000s; 2010s; 2020s
- See also: Other events of 2021; History of the Central African Republic

The following is a list of events of the year 2021 in the Central African Republic.

== Incumbents ==
- President: Faustin-Archange Touadéra
- Prime Minister: Firmin Ngrébada (until 15 June), Henri-Marie Dondra (starting 15 June)

== Monthly events ==
- Ongoing – COVID-19 pandemic in the Central African Republic, Central African Republic Civil War

=== January ===
Situation in Central African Republic on 3 January 2021 at height of CPC control

- January 3 – Rebels seize Bangassou and now control two-thirds of the country.
- January 4 – 2020–21 Central African general election: Preliminary results show that President Touadera has won reelection with 53% of the vote. Turnout was 76.3% of registered voters.
- January 7 – Pope Francis calls for dialogue after the conflicted election. "I ask all parties to join a brotherly and respectful dialogue, to reject hatred and avoid all forms of violence," said Francis. Ten opposition parties have called for cancellation of the election.
- January 9 – French jets fly over CAR as tensions rise. Rebels attack Bouar.
- January 10 – The Russian army begins withdrawing its 300 military instructors.
- January 13 – A U.N. peacekeeper from Rwandan is killed in fighting near Bangui. Rebels attacked a police station in the PK12 district before being repelled.
- January 18 – The Constitutional Court confirmed President Touadera's victory in the January election.
- January 22 – The government declares a state of emergency as rebels surround Bangui.
- January 24 – Mahamat Said Abdel Kani is handed over to the International Criminal Court on charges of war crimes.
- January 26 – The army kills 44 rebels in fighting in Boali, Ombella-M'Poko.
- January 30 – The International Conference on the Great Lakes Region warns about regional stability as the Central African Republic Civil War intensifies. 93,000 refugees have seek protection in the Democratic Republic of the Congo and 13,000 in Chad, the Republic of the Congo, and Cameroon; another 100,000 are internally displaced. Travel between Cameroon and Bangui is nearly impossible.

=== February ===
- February 8 – Fourteen trucks break through a blockade, bringing food to Bangui for the first time in fifty days.
- February 13 – President Touadera announces a second round of elections in some areas and a first round in areas that were controlled by rebels during the December 2020 elections.
- A clash occurs in Bambari, with Russian mercenaries and the Central African Armed Forces launching an attack hunting for Séléka militia. Indiscriminate firing by FACA and Russian mercenaries on the al Taqwa mosque lead to over a dozen civilian casualties.
- February 24 – Government forces take Bossangoa, Ouham, considered a stronghold of former president Francois Bozize.

=== March and April ===
- March 14 – 2020–21 Central African general election, second round in some areas, first round in others
- March 21 – Former president François Bozizé takes over the rebel alliance trying to overthrow the government.
- March 31 – The UN expresses concern over reports of "grave human rights abuses" by Russian mercenaries.

== See also ==
- COVID-19 pandemic in Africa
- African Continental Free Trade Area
- Community of Sahel–Saharan States
