= 2019 in the Central African Republic =

- Decades: 1990s; 2000s; 2010s; 2020s
- See also: Other events of 2019; History of the Central African Republic

The following is a list of events of the year 2019 in the Central African Republic.

== Incumbents ==
- President: Faustin-Archange Touadéra
- Prime Minister: Simplice Sarandji (until February 27); Firmin Ngrébada onwards

== Events ==
Ongoing: Battle of Bakouma

- Diamville, the Russian owned, diamond and gold trading company, affiliated with the Russian private military company Wagner Group is established.
- January – January 2019 Bambari clashes
- January 24 – The Ministry of Health declared a national measles epidemic. Between February 2019 and January 2020, 3,600 people were infected while 53 others died.
- May 21 – 2019 Ouham-Pendé killings

== Deaths ==
- February 17 – Joseph Akouissone, 76, filmmaker and journalist.

== See also ==
- List of years in the Central African Republic
- 2019 in the Central African Republic
