= Kouki =

Kouki is both a surname and a given name. Notable people with the name include:

- Eemeli Kouki (born 1991), Finnish volleyball player
- Hadeel Kouki (born 1992), Syrian former human rights activist
- Manel Kouki (born 1988), Tunisian handball player
- Mikko Kouki (born 1967), Finnish actor
- Mohamed Kouki (born 1975), Tunisian soccer manager
- Nabil Kouki (born 1970), Tunisian soccer manager
- Kouki Arai (born 1993), Japanese rugby union player
- Kouki Iwasaki (born 1991), Japanese professional wrestler
- Kouki Takahashi (1987–2011), Japanese motorcycle racer

There is a town called Kouki in the Central African Republic

== See also ==
- Kokei (disambiguation)
- Koki (disambiguation)
- Kuki (disambiguation)
