= 2015 in the Central African Republic =

- Decades: 1990s; 2000s; 2010s; 2020s
- See also: Other events of 2015; History of the Central African Republic

The following is a list of events of the year 2015 in the Central African Republic.

== Incumbents ==
- President: Catherine Samba-Panza (acting)
- Prime Minister: Mahamat Kamoun (acting)

== Events ==
=== January–June ===
- January 6 - A man claiming to be the Lord's Resistance Army top commander Ugandan Dominic Ongwen turns himself in to United States forces in the Central African Republic.

=== July–December ===
- September 25-October 1 - Sectarian violence as a part of the Central African Republic Civil War kill 31.
- November 29, 2015 - Pope Francis visits the Republic, pleading to not give into “the temptation of fear of others, of the unfamiliar, of what is not part of our ethnic group, our political views or our religious confession”.
- December 30, 2015 - The first elections take place after the Seleka seized power in 2013.
