= COVID-19 vaccination in the Central African Republic =

Plan to immunize against COVID-19

- Date: May 20, 2021 - present
- Location: Central African Republic
- Cause: COVID-19 pandemic

COVID-19 vaccination in the Central African Republic is an ongoing immunisation campaign against severe acute respiratory syndrome coronavirus 2 (SARS-CoV-2), the virus that causes coronavirus disease 2019 (COVID-19), in response to the ongoing pandemic in the country.

The Central African Republic began its vaccination program on 20 May 2021, initially using the 60,000 doses of the Covishield vaccine delivered through the COVAX facility. As of 15 June 2021, 42,644 doses have been administered, 41,095 people with one dose and 1,549 people fully vaccinated.

== History ==
=== Timeline ===
==== May 2021 ====
By the end of the month 19,290 vaccine doses had been administered.

==== June 2021 ====
By the end of the month 77,543 doses had been administered.

==== July 2021 ====
By the end of the month 94,600 doses had been administered.

==== August 2021 ====
By the end of the month 103,771 doses had been administered.

==== September 2021 ====
By the end of the month 187,160 doses had been administered.

==== October 2021 ====
By the end of the month 421,696 doses had been administered. 16% of the target population had been fully vaccinated.

==== November 2021 ====
By the end of the month 422,496 doses had been administered. 17% of the target population had been fully vaccinated.

==== December 2021 ====
By the end of the month 518,577 doses had been administered. 22% of the target population had been fully vaccinated.

==== January 2022 ====
By the end of the month 652,134 doses had been administered. 26% of the target population had been fully vaccinated.

==== February 2022 ====
By the end of the month 855,735 doses had been administered and 738,466 persons had been fully vaccinated.

==== March 2022 ====
By the end of the month 1,012,846 doses had been administered and 897,945 persons had been fully vaccinated.

==== April 2022 ====
By the end of the month 1,037,580 doses had been administered and 988,591 persons had been fully vaccinated.

== Progress ==
Cumulative vaccinations in the Central African Republic

View source data.
