= 2006 in the Central African Republic =

- Decades: 1980s; 1990s; 2000s; 2010s; 2020s
- See also: Other events of 2006; History of the Central African Republic

The following is a list of events of the year 2006 in the Central African Republic.

== Incumbents ==
- President: François Bozizé
- Prime Minister: Élie Doté

== Events ==
=== June ===
- June 27 - Chadian rebels attack the neighboring Central African Republic. They have reportedly formed an alliance with CAR rebels. Large areas of both countries have descended into violence.

=== July ===
- July 3 - United Nations Secretary General Kofi Annan issues a report warning that ongoing fighting in Chad, Sudan, the Central African Republic, and Cameroon are increasingly destabilized and that borders are loosely enforced.

=== November ===
- November 10 - Rebels claim to have captured a second town in the Central African Republic during a two-week-long offensive.
- November 17 - Chad has offered to send troops to the Central African Republic to help fight rebels it claims are backed by Sudan.
- November 28 - French forces have clashed with rebels in the Central African Republic during a government offensive to regain control of the northern town of Birao.
- November 30 - French fighter planes have fired at rebels in northern Central African Republic where thousands have fled fighting in recent weeks.
