= 2012 in the Central African Republic =

- Decades: 1990s; 2000s; 2010s; 2020s
- See also: Other events of 2012; History of the Central African Republic

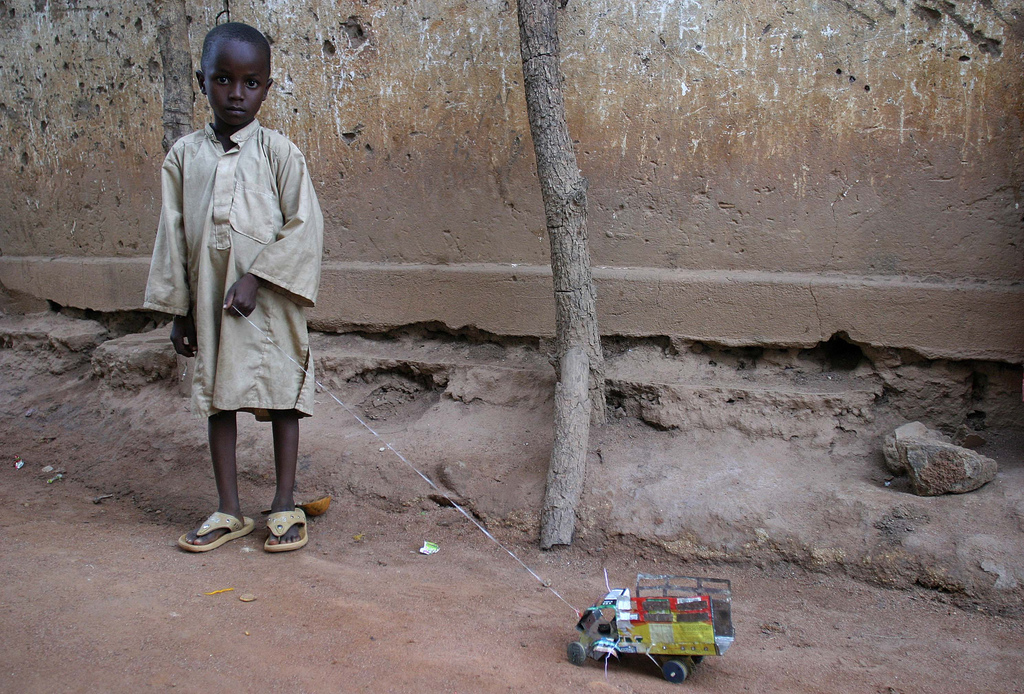

The following is a list of events of the year 2012 in the Central African Republic.

== Incumbents ==
- President: François Bozizé

== Events ==
=== February ===
- 19 February - Chadian rebels rob 40 people including a local government official.

=== December ===
- 19 December - Chad deploys troops into Bria to help Central African forces defend it from the Séléka rebels.
- 23 December - The Séléka take over Bambari after a string of small military successes.
- 27 December - President Bozizé asks for international help after rebels begin advancing on the capital of Bangui. The United States suspends its embassy operations in the country.
- 28 December - After weeks of unrest, the government and Séléka rebels agree to have talks.
- 29 December - Despite talks, Séléka rebels advance more and gain territory in the city of Bangui.
- 30 December - While rebels advance, Bozizé promises a national unity government to be formed.
- 31 December - The rebels reject Bozizé's national unity government proposal.
