= 2013 in the Central African Republic =

- Decades: 1990s; 2000s; 2010s; 2020s
- See also: Other events of 2013; History of the Central African Republic

The following is a list of events of the year 2013 in the Central African Republic.

== Incumbents ==
- President: François Bozizé (until 24 March), Michel Djotodia (starting 25 March)
- Prime minister: Faustin-Archange Touadéra (until 17 January), Nicolas Tiangaye (starting 17 January)

== Events ==
=== January ===
- 2 January - Séléka rebels halt their advance on the capital of Bangui and agreed to peace talks. However, President Bozizé fires his army chief of staff and son as defence minister to take the ministry administration himself.
- 6 January - South Africa announces plans to deploy 400 more soldiers into the Central African Republic to assist President Bozizé against the Séléka rebels.
- 11 January - The government signs a ceasefire with the rebels ending the conflict and establish a coalition government.

=== March ===
- 23 March - All UN personnel are withdrawn from the Central African Republic as Séléka rebels move in to capture Bangui.
- 24 March - The Séléka rebels take the presidential palace. Bozizé flees to the neighboring Democratic Republic of the Congo.
- 25 March - Michel Djotodia declares himself as President of the Central African Republic and promises to keep to the agreement of power-sharing and end looting. South African President Jacob Zuma claims 13 of his country's soldiers were killed in the conflict.
- 26 March - President Djotodia suspends the constitution and dissolves the parliament.

=== April ===
- 4 April - South Africa announces the full withdrawal of troops from the Central African Republic.

=== September ===
- 9 September - 60 people are killed during clashes between Séléka forces and supporters of former president Bozizé.

=== October ===
- 9 October - 60 people are killed in clashes between former Séléka forces and local militias.

=== November ===
- 26 November - France announces plans to intervene in the conflict ongoing in the Central African Republic.

=== December ===
- 5 December - The United Nations approves a peacekeeping mission to be sent to the country led by the African Union and France due to recent clashes seeing more than 100 people killed.
- 6 December - The Red Cross claims that over 300 people have been killed in two days of fighting in the capital of Bangui.
- 7 December - France extends its role in the conflict by deploying 1600 troops to aid the peacekeepers.
- 10 December - Two French troops are killed in clashes in Bangui, the first French casualties since the deployment of 1600 troops.
- 26 December - 40 people including six Chadian peacekeepers are killed in clashes in the country.
