= 2024 in the Central African Republic =

- Decades: 2000s; 2010s; 2020s
- See also: Other events of 2024; History of the Central African Republic

The following is a list of events of the year 2024 in the Central African Republic.

== Incumbents ==
- President: Faustin-Archange Touadéra
- Prime Minister: Félix Moloua

== Events ==
=== January ===
- 15 January – A Cameroonian peacekeeper in MINUSCA is killed and five others are injured in an explosion in Mbindale, Lim-Pendé.

=== April ===
- 19 April – Fifty-eight people are killed after an overcrowded ferry carrying 300 people capsizes in the Mpoko River near Bangui.

=== May ===
- 12 May – At least four people are killed in an attack by the Coalition of Patriots for Change in the gold-mining town of Gaga, Ombella-M'Poko.

=== June ===
- 8 June – The government orders the suspension of operations by the Chinese mining firm Daqing SARL in Mingala, citing cooperation with rebels and other offences.

=== July ===
- 29 July – Authorities declare an outbreak of mpox in Bangui.
- 30 July – The United Nations Security Council unanimously votes to lift the weapons embargo it had placed on the CAR due to the country's civil war.

=== November ===
- 7 November – The International Criminal Court unseals an arrest warrant for Edmond Beina, an anti-Balaka commander wanted for committing a massacre against Muslims during the Central African Republic Civil War in 2014.
- 22 November – A strike is held by Cameroonian truck drivers servicing the Central African Republic in protest over the killing of one of their colleagues by suspected members of the Wagner Group in Bogoin.
- 26 November – Ten people are killed by unidentified gunmen near Bria.

== Holidays ==
- 1 January - New Year's Day
- 29 March - Barthelemy Boganda Day
- 1 April - Easter Monday
- 10 April – Korité
- 1 May – Labour Day
- 9 May - Ascension Day
- 20 May - Whit Monday
- 16 June – Tabaski
- 30 June – General Prayer Day
- 13 August - Independence Day
- 15 August - Assumption Day
- 1 November - All Saints' Day
- 1 December - National Day
- 25 December - Christmas Day

== See also ==
- African Continental Free Trade Area
- Community of Sahel–Saharan States
