= 2016 in the Central African Republic =

- Decades: 1990s; 2000s; 2010s; 2020s
- See also: Other events of 2016; History of the Central African Republic

The following events occurred in the Central African Republic in the year 2016.

== Incumbents ==
- Catherine Samba-Panza, Acting President, 23 January 2014-current
- Mahamat Kamoun, Acting Prime Minister, 10 August 2014-current

== Events ==
- Many of the candidates in the 2015 general election call on election authorities to stop counting votes, alleging voter fraud.
- United Nations troops operating under MINUSCA were hit with a new round of sexual abuse accusations.
- The Lord's Resistance Army conducts multiple attacks the eastern CAR, killing one and kidnapping several civilians
