= Kokei =

Kokei may refer to:

== People ==
- Kōkei (monk) (皇慶; 977?–1049), Japanese Buddhist monk
- Kōkei (sculptor) (康慶; 1175–1200), Japanese sculptor of the Kamakura period
- Kokei Kobayashi (小林 古径; 1883–1957), Japanese Nihonga painter
- Kōkei Tsuruya (弦屋 光渓; born 1946), Japanese contemporary woodblock print artist
