= United Nations Security Council Resolution 1159 =

UN Security Council Resolution 1159
- MINURCA medal bar
- Date: 27 March 1998
- Meeting no.: 3,867
- Code: S/RES/1159 (Document)
- Subject: The situation in Central African Republic
- Voting summary: 15 voted for; None voted against; None abstained
- Result: Adopted

Security Council composition
- Permanent members: China; France; Russia; United Kingdom; United States
- Non-permanent members: Bahrain; Brazil; Costa Rica; Gabon; Gambia; Japan; Kenya; Portugal; Slovenia; Sweden

United Nations Security Council resolution 1159, adopted unanimously on 27 March 1998, after reaffirming resolutions 1125 (1997), 1136 (1997), 1152 (1998) and 1155 (1998), regarding the situation in the Central African Republic, the council established the United Nations Mission in the Central African Republic (MINURCA).

The MISAB monitoring mission of African countries was commended by the Security Council for its contributions towards stabilising the Central African Republic, including the surrender of weapons. It also stressed for the need of all the parties to the Bangui Agreements to implement them fully and to prepare for elections scheduled for August or September 1998.

The council welcomed the progress made by the Central African authorities towards national reconciliation, and called for further implementation the agreements. Countries participating in MISAB were authorised under Chapter VII of the United Nations Charter to continue ensuring the security and freedom of movement of their personnel. Additionally, all countries, international organisations and financial institutions were asked to assist in the development of the Central African Republic after the conflict.

MINURCA was then established with a mandate beginning from 15 April 1998 and a military component of up to 1,350 personnel. It was instructed to:

(a) ensure the security and stability in and around the capital, Bangui;
(b) assist the national security forces with law enforcement;
(c) monitor disarmament;
(d) ensure the safety and freedom of movement of United Nations personnel;
(e) assist in the training and restructuring of the national police;
(f) provide advice and technical assistance during the electoral process.

The initial mandate of MINURCA was to last for three months until 15 July 1998, and was headed by a Special Representative of the Secretary-General. The Secretary-General Kofi Annan, who had established a trust fund in order to finance the operation, was directed to keep the Council informed and to submit a report by 20 June 1998 on the mandate of MINURCA and the implementation of the current resolution. Finally, the Central African Republic was asked to conclude a Status of Forces Agreement with Secretary-General before 25 April 1998.

== See also ==
- History of the Central African Republic
- List of United Nations Security Council Resolutions 1101 to 1200 (1997–1998)
