= 2018 in the Central African Republic =

- Decades: 1990s; 2000s; 2010s; 2020s
- See also: Other events of 2018; History of the Central African Republic

The following is a list of events of the year 2018 in the Central African Republic.

== Incumbents ==
- President: Faustin-Archange Touadéra
- Prime Minister: Simplice Sarandji

== Events ==
- Ongoing – Central African Republic Civil War
- 31 October to 17 November – 2018 Batangafo clashes

== Deaths ==
- 18 March – Michel Adama-Tamboux, politician (b. 1928).
