= 1966 in the Central African Republic =

- Decades: 1950s; 1960s; 1970s; 1980s
- See also: Other events of 1966; History of the Central African Republic

The following is a list of events of the year 1966 in the Central African Republic.

== Incumbents ==
- President: David Dacko (until January 1), Jean-Bédel Bokassa (starting January 1)

== Events ==
=== January ===
- January 1 - A coup brings Colonel Jean-Bédel Bokassa into power in the Central African Republic, ousting President David Dacko.
