= 2014 in the Central African Republic =

- Decades: 1990s; 2000s; 2010s; 2020s
- See also: Other events of 2014; History of the Central African Republic

The following is a list of events of the year 2014 in the Central African Republic.

== Incumbents ==
- President: Michel Djotodia (until 23 January), Catherine Samba-Panza (acting) (starting 23 January)
- Prime Minister:
  - until 10 January: Nicolas Tiangaye
  - 25 January-10 August: André Nzapayeké (acting)
  - starting 10 August: Mahamat Kamoun (acting)

== Events ==
Map of situation in C.A.R. in 2014

=== January ===
- January 10 - Amidst pressure for failing to resolve ongoing conflict, President of the Central African Republic Michel Djotodia resigns nine months after Séléka toppled François Bozizé. Alexandre-Ferdinand Nguendet becomes acting president.
- January 11 - African migrants are to be evacuated as violence continues in the Central African Republic.
- January 20 - The transitional National Assembly of the Central African Republic chooses Catherine Samba-Panza as the interim President, making her the country's first female head of state.
- January 23 - Catherine Samba-Panza assumed office as the Head of State of the Transition of the Central African Republic.
- January 25 - André Nzapayeké assumed office as Acting Prime Minister.

=== February ===
- February 14 - Several massacres were committed by Anti-balaka against Muslim civilians. This forced thousands of Muslims to flee the country.

=== April ===
- Militia attacked a convoy of Chadian troops and Muslims. Around 700 people were displaced.

== See also ==
- History of the Central African Republic

== Notes ==
- Central African Republic was under conflict with the Djotodia administration from April 2013 to January 10, 2014.
