= 2017 in the Central African Republic =

- Decades: 1990s; 2000s; 2010s; 2020s
- See also: Other events of 2017; History of the Central African Republic

The following is a list of events of the year 2017 in the Central African Republic.

== Incumbents ==
- President: Faustin-Archange Touadéra
- Prime Minister: Simplice Sarandji

== Events ==
Map of situation in C.A.R. in 2017

- Central African Republic Civil War (2012–present), ongoing

== Deaths ==
- 28 April – Edouard Mathos, Roman Catholic bishop (b. 1948).
