= United Nations Security Council Resolution 1155 =

UN Security Council Resolution 1155
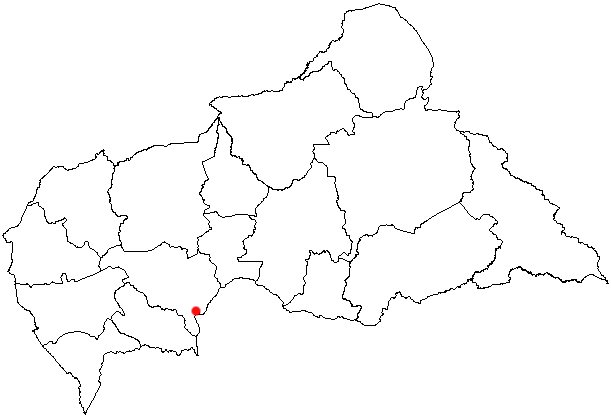
- Location of Bangui in the Central African Republic
- Date: 16 March 1998
- Meeting no.: 3,860
- Code: S/RES/1155 (Document)
- Subject: The situation in Central African Republic
- Voting summary: 15 voted for; None voted against; None abstained
- Result: Adopted

Security Council composition
- Permanent members: China; France; Russia; United Kingdom; United States
- Non-permanent members: Bahrain; Brazil; Costa Rica; Gabon; Gambia; Japan; Kenya; Portugal; Slovenia; Sweden

United Nations Security Council Resolution 1155, adopted unanimously on 16 March 1998, after reaffirming resolutions 1125 (1997), 1136 (1997) and 1152 (1998) regarding the situation in the Central African Republic, the Council authorised the continuation of the Inter-African Mission to Monitor the Implementation of the Bangui Agreements (MISAB) mission in the country until 27 March 1998.

The MISAB monitoring mission of African countries was commended by the Security Council for its contributions towards stabilising the Central African Republic, including the surrender of weapons. The countries participating in the mission had extended its mandate until 15 April 1998, in order to ensure a smooth transition to a United Nations peacekeeping mission in the country. It also stressed for the need of all the parties to the Bangui Agreements to implement them fully.

Acting under Chapter VII of the United Nations Charter, countries participating in MISAB were authorised to ensure the security and freedom of movement of their personnel until 27 March 1998. On that date, the Security Council would make a decision regarding the establishment of a peacekeeping mission in the country.

== See also ==
- History of the Central African Republic
- List of United Nations Security Council Resolutions 1101 to 1200 (1997–1998)
