= Kuki =

Kuki may refer to:

== Places ==
- Kuki, Isfahan, Iran, a village
- Kuki, Saitama, a city in Japan

== People ==
=== India ===
- Kuki people an ethnic migrant group in Northeast India.
  - Thadou-Kuki people, often rereferred to as "Kuki people"
- Kuki language, an alternative term for the Thadou language

=== Members of the Kuki clan of Japan ===
- Kuki Moritaka (1573–1632), Japanese general, admiral and daimyo
- Ryuhei Kuki (born 1998), Japanese professional baseball catcher
- Kuki Ryūichi (1852–1931), Japanese government official, politician and nobility
- Shūzō Kuki (1888–1941), Japanese art critic and philosopher
- Kuki Yoshitaka (1542–1600), Japanese general, admiral and daimyo

=== Others ===
- Kuki (footballer, born 1971), Brazilian football head coach and former forward Sílvio Luiz Borba da Silva
- Kuki (footballer, born 1994), Spanish football forward Míriam Rodríguez González
- Kuki people, an ethnic group of northeastern India and Myanmar
  - Thadou Kuki people, often referred to as Kuki people

== Fictional characters ==
- Kuki Sanban or Numbuh 3, in the animated series Codename: Kids Next Door
- Kuki Shinobu, in the 2020 video game Genshin Impact

== KUKI ==
- KUKI (AM), a radio station (1400 AM) licensed to Ukiah, California, United States
- KUKI-FM, a radio station (103.3 FM) licensed to Ukiah, California
- KUKI, the ICAO code for Ukiah Municipal Airport, California

== Other uses ==
- Thadou language, also called the Kuki language, spoken in northest India
- Kuki (pie), a staple in Kurdish cuisine
- Kuki, an ancient samurai family of fighting style called Kukishin ryu
- Kuki AI, an embodied bot designed to befriend humans in the metaverse
- Kuki Inc., a Japanese adult video company
- KuKi, the shortened name for Kuparikiekko, an ice hockey team located in Harjavalta, Finland

== See also ==
- Kuki-Chin languages spoken by the Kuki and related peoples
- Kooki (film), a 2024 Indian Hindi-language film
