= Kōkei Tsuruya =

Japanese printmaker, painter

Kōkei Tsuruya (弦屋 光渓, Tsuruya Kōkei, born July 1946 in Chigasaki, Kanagawa Prefecture) is a contemporary Japanese woodblock print artist, best known for his Kabuki actor portraits. In 1985, art dealer Robert Sawers referred to him as a modern-day Sharaku because of the expressive quality of his actor prints.

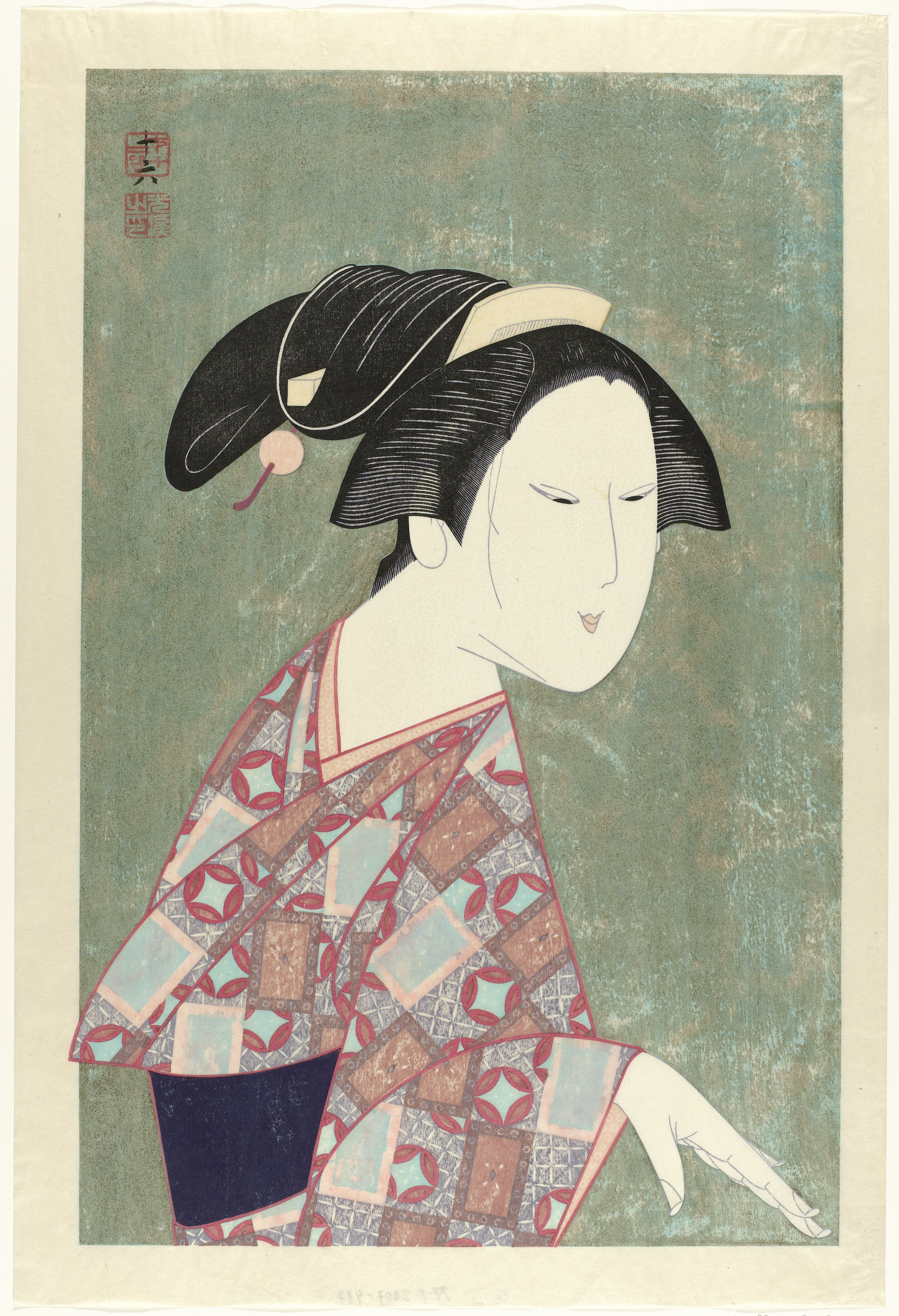
Tsuruya Kōkei, The Old Woman of "Toshima" (「年増」の年増), 1990

== Life ==
Kōkei Tsuruya, whose real name is Gen Mitsui (三井 弦, Mitsui Gen), was born in 1946 in Chigasaki, Kanagawa, Japan. He grew up in Shinjuku, Tokyo. His father was a painter, and his grandfather was the Western-style painter and printmaker Hiromitsu Nakazawa (中澤 弘光), known for landscape series. Although born into a family of artists, Kōkei had no formal art training, nor did he initially intend to follow the path of his father and grandfather, both professional painters, to become an artist himself; it was his elder brother, who carved wood at an arts and crafts school, whose work influenced the direction Kōkei's own research would eventually take.

Kōkei studied at Waseda University and began working as a clerical employee until 1978, when, at the age of thirty-two, inspired by a Kabuki performance, he created his first artistic print. With the clear intent of producing yakusha-e recalling the style of Sharaku, Kōkei began making his first prints of famous contemporary actors with great energy and enthusiasm, but was strongly disheartened by the absence of any public response, as audiences showed no interest in buying or even looking closely at his prints. Frustrated by this first experience, he nonetheless decided to make a further attempt to become a print artist, this time on a different subject: a series of eight prints titled Hachi Dai-jigoku Zu, which proved to be his own personal hell, and another failure. That same year, he exhibited his works at the Kabuki-za Theatre Gallery, launching his career in woodblock printing. Kōkei would sketch scenes during rehearsals and early performances at Kabuki-za, then produce woodblock prints within 10–15 days so they could be sold during the second half of the 25-day performances. The audience would purchase the prints on-site. He continued this practice until 2000, creating over 200 works during that period.

Kōkei's perseverance won him the admiration of Takeomi Nagayama, president of Shōchiku, the company that runs the Kabuki-za, who not only praised the young artist but gradually introduced his work to other figures in the Kabuki world, and proposed selling his prints at the theatre's box office; sales were not spectacular at first, but grew steadily until, after seventy-two editions, demand for Kōkei's prints became so overwhelming that a subscription programme had to be introduced. Kōkei would typically offer ten prints for sale at the Kabuki-za starting on the tenth day of the month, presenting another ten every five days until the final day of the run: some thirty or forty prints sold at the theatre in total, with further impressions going to subscription customers. He would first sketch the actors' faces from photographs before performances, then attend rehearsals for the productions featuring his selected actors and the opening performances themselves, concentrating solely on the actor he intended to depict, before devoting about three days to design, four days to carving the blocks, and three more days to printing the edition.

He gained international recognition and participated in numerous exhibitions, including at the British Museum (UK), the USC Pacific Asia Museum (USA), and the Redfern Gallery (London). Many of his prints are held in major collections.

From 2003 onward, Kōkei lived in Atami in Shizuoka Prefecture, where he began a series of self-portraits known as Loneliness, marking a departure from his Kabuki actor prints. In the later years of his career, he created the series Five Styles of Banzai Ukiyo-e, in which he portrayed classic Ukiyo-e artists such as Hokusai, Hiroshige, Kuniyoshi, Kunisada, and Yoshitoshi. This series, referred to in Japanese as Banzai Ukiyo-e Wagō Sugata, was modelled on Kuniyoshi's own Tsūzoku Suikoden Gōketsu Hyakuhachinin no Hitori. Its second print is dedicated to Kuniyoshi himself, his face modelled on one of Kuniyoshi's own compositions, depicting him with a cat on his shoulder and wearing a yukata decorated with a goldfish motif; in the background, the surface of the water can be seen covering a monster with a human face, wrapped in mosquito netting.

== Style and works ==
Kōkei Tsuruya is known for his expressive Kabuki prints that capture the drama and emotion of the performers. Among his early works were also kachōga (bird-and-flower prints), but Kōkei fundamentally went on to produce around twelve theatrical print projects a year from 1978 to 2000; his early series were issued in editions of thirty-six or forty-five, though he did not always complete them, sometimes defacing the blocks even before the announced number of prints had actually been produced.

His yakusha-e are generally okubi-e (bust portraits) that, following Sharaku, his clear artistic inspiration, capture the tension and emotion of the actors through exaggerated facial expressions and hand gestures; compared with his predecessor, Kōkei places even greater emphasis on the expressive aspect of the print, deliberately distorting parts of the actor's body to highlight its salient features.

His artistic breakthrough came with Genkurō (October 1983), a portrait of Ichikawa Ennosuke III as the fox Genkurō in Yoshitsune Senbon Zakura, the artist's sixty-second design and the first to reveal a clearly personal style, its delicate flowing lines and determined facial expression, together with its otherworldly colours set against a silver mica background, capturing the essence of a fox assuming human form. Less than a year later, in July 1984, Kōkei published another masterwork, a portrait of Ichikawa Ennosuke III as Kiyohime no Jatai in the play Kinnozai Sarushima Dairi at the Kabuki-za; from his fourth okubi-e series, the design again dramatizes a Kabuki supernatural tale, rendering the fury of a scorned woman through her facial expression and an enormous, seemingly melting hand.

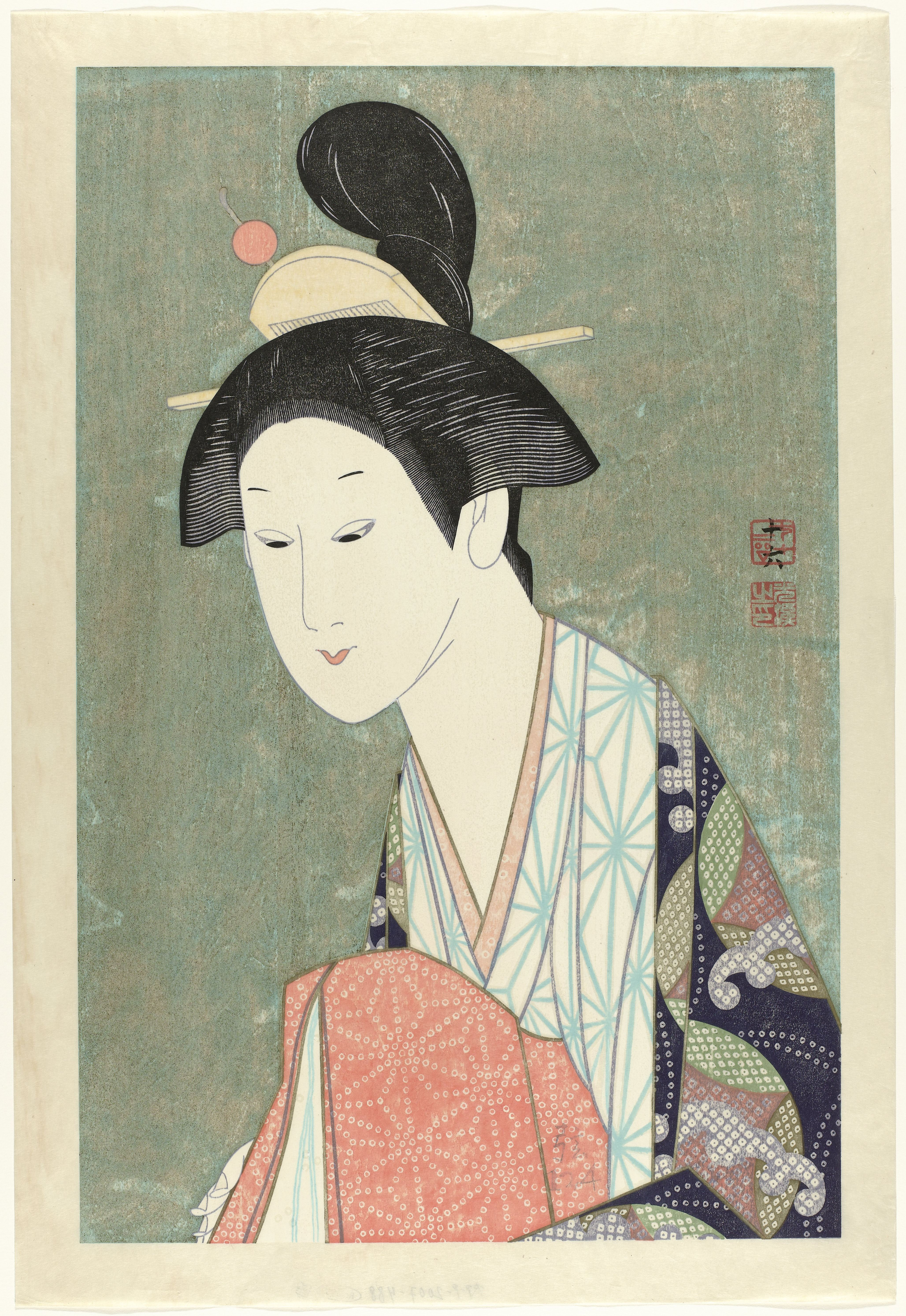
Tsuruya Kōkei, The Tayū from "Futari Wakikyū" (「二人椀久」の太夫), 1990

Kōkei's admirers regard his colours as subtle and expressive; his deep respect for Kabuki traditions, and for their specific meanings and symbolism, is clearly expressed in prints that remain faithful to what is actually performed at the Kabuki-za. In 1992 he changed his style from vivid colours to a semi-monochromatic palette, explaining that although it had been enjoyable to experiment with colours or with the order in which they were applied to the blocks, once a colour scheme was decided, repeating the same colours over and over across an entire edition had become an almost emotionally painful task. This proved to be only a temporary phase, which ended the following year, in 1993, with some subsequent, likewise temporary, experiments toward monochromatic ink; Kōkei's creativity is expressed above all in his choice of background colours.

Kōkei's perceptive, sometimes grotesque studies of contemporary actors have made him the most important Kabuki print artist since Shunsen, and his 1988 exhibition at the Pacific Asia Museum in Pasadena won him great appreciation among Western collectors as well. Kōkei has thereby marked the revival of a genre long considered by critics to be essentially dead within contemporary Japanese woodblock printing, since his work reveals a desire to create psychological portraits of theatre actors rather than mere reproductions of reality.

A complete list of works with illustrations is available on the artist's website.

== Materials and technique ==
With the exception of his early Kabuki subjects and a few non-theatrical designs, Kōkei's prints are distinguished by his use of very thin paper, difficult to print but underscoring the ephemeral nature of the work; on ganpi paper, which he favoured both for its light brown tone and for the effect it has on the ageing of his colours, he applied a range of lavish and elaborate techniques, such as gofun and mica, that demand the highest level of skill but transform an ordinary print into a deluxe edition.

For his smaller editions he often used hō (silver magnolia), a wood Kōkei described as "neither too hard nor too soft," and therefore easier to carve than the cherry wood (sakura) common in ukiyo-e, from which thousands of impressions were often taken. His paper editions are also characteristically small in scale, which allowed him to complete an edition of around seventy-two prints in forty days, from design through carving to printing; his prints are further rare because Kōkei regularly destroyed the woodblocks once he had finished a print, an unusual practice for an artist producing limited editions.

== Exhibitions ==
Notable exhibitions include:

- 1990: Japanese Art to celebrate the opening of the Japanese Gallery, British Museum
- 1994: Modern Japanese Prints, 1912-1989: Woodblocks and Stencils at the British Museum
- 2000: Collection of the Actor Prints by Tsuruya Kōkei: The Complete Woodblock Prints at the Hiraki Ukiyo-e Museum, Yokohama
- 2011: Tsuruya Kōkei: Actor Woodblock Prints at the Bunkamura Gallery, Tokyo
- 2013: Exhibition of Tsuruya Kōkei at the Citizens Gallery, Sakura City Museum of Art, Chiba Prefecture
- 2019: Tsuruya Kōkei: Modern Kabuki Prints Revised & Revisited, USC Pacific Asia Museum

== Bibliography ==
- Hiraki Ukiyo-e Foundation. Tsuruya Kokei: The Complete Woodblock Prints (2000)
- Kabuki-za (Theatre), Tokyo (ed.), Tsuruya Kokei: Kabuki Actor Prints (1988) Shochiku Co.
- Smith, Lawrence; Harris, Victor; Clark, Timothy. Japanese Art: Masterpieces in the British Museum (1990), British Museum Press
- Smith, Lawrence. Modern Japanese Prints 1912–1989: Woodblocks and Stencils (1994), British Museum Press, p. 37 and nos 139-40.
