= United Nations Mission in the Central African Republic =

1998–2000 peacekeeping force

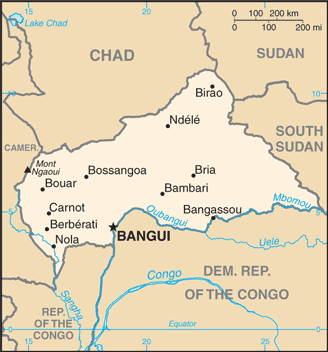
- Central African Republic
- Abbreviation: MINURCA
- Type: Peacekeeping Mission
- Legal status: Accomplished
- Leader: Oluyemi Adeniji
- Parent organization: United Nations Security Council

The United Nations Mission in the Central African Republic, more commonly known as MINURCA (which is formed from the initials of its French name Mission des Nations Unies en République Centrafricaine) was a United Nations peacekeeping force in the Central African Republic. The 1350-troop mission was established by the United Nations Security Council Resolution 1159 in March 1998. It was replaced in 2000 after the Central African Republic conducted two peaceful elections, with the entirely civilian composed UN Peace-Building Support Office in the Central African Republic (BONUCA).

== History ==
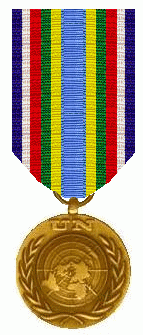
The medal awarded to peacekeepers for 90 days of consecutive service in MINURCA

Ange-Félix Patassé came to power in October 1993 following national elections; he was the first democratically elected president of the Central African Republic. He inherited a nearly bankrupt government and there was civil unrest by unpaid civil servants. Military officers were also unpaid, and some of them accused him of unequal treatment of officers from different ethnic groups. The disgruntled military officers attempted three coups in 1996. There was also widespread looting in Bangui and other provinces and the police created the Squad for the Repression of Banditry, which had the power to execute criminals the day after their apprehension.

French troops who were present in the country since its independence attempted to restore order on the President's request. In December 1996, Patassé asked the Presidents of Gabon, Burkina Faso, Chad and Mali to mediate a truce between the government and rebel forces. Following this mediation process, the Bangui Agreements were signed in January 1997 by the government, opposition forces and religious groups. A peacekeeping force called Mission Interafricaine de Surveillance des Accords de Bangui (MISAB) was established to supervise the accord. It consisted of around 800 troops from Burkina Faso, Chad, Gabon, Mali, Senegal and Togo, besides logistic and financial support from France. The efforts were welcomed by the United Nations Security Council with Resolution 1125 in August 1997, which authorised the presence of the force for a period of three months.

French troops temporarily supported the peacekeeping force after escalation of violence in June 1997. They however withdrew from the country in October 1997, closing their long standing military base in Bouar as well. Security Council Resolution 1136, adopted in November 1997, authorised MISAB for another three months. The French troop withdrawal and their plans for stopping logistic support by April 1998 prompted the Security Council to adopt the Security Council Resolution 1159 in March 1998 which agreed to establish the United Nations Mission in the Central African Republic by 15 April 1998 to take over from MISAB.

== Activities ==
The peacekeeping force, which had a strength of 1350, was assembled by 15 April 1998 and comprised soldiers from Benin, Burkina Faso, Cameroon, Canada, Chad, Côte d'Ivoire, Egypt, France, Gabon, Mali, Portugal, Senegal, Togo and Tunisia. In addition to the military personnel, the force had 24 civilian police personnel and civil staff. The peacekeeping force were instrumental in conducting the legislative elections in late 1998 and the presidential elections in September 1999. Even though disarmament was not explicitly mentioned in its mandate, MINURCA continued MISAB's policy of storing and disposing of weapons collected from dissidents. Security Council Resolution 1271, adopted in October 1999, extended the mandate of MINURCA till 15 February 2000.

A civilian mission headed by the Representative of the Secretary-General, called the UN Peace-Building Support Office in the Central African Republic (BONUCA formed from the initials of its French name Bureau des Nations Unies pour la consolidation de la paix en République centrafricaine). took over from MINURCA on 15 February 2000. The total expenditures incurred by MINURCA amounted to $101.3 million.

== Controversies ==
On 9 June, the UN announced that a unit of 60 Tanzanian UN peacekeepers is to be sent home after eleven members of the unit were accused of sexual abuse and exploitation. Some of the victims are believed to have been minors at the time the abuse occurred. Since 2013, more than 100 accusations of sexual abuse against women and children perpetrated by peacekeepers in the Central African Republic have been voiced.
