= COVID-19 pandemic in the Central African Republic =

Ongoing COVID-19 viral pandemic in the Central African Republic

- Disease: COVID-19
- Pathogen: SARS-CoV-2
- Location: Central African Republic
- First outbreak: Wuhan, China
- Index case: Bangui
- Arrival date: 14 March 2020 (6 years, 5 months, 1 week and 1 day)
- Confirmed cases: 15,493 (updated 5 August 2026)
- Deaths: 113 (updated 5 August 2026)

The COVID-19 pandemic in the Central African Republic was a part of the worldwide pandemic of coronavirus disease 2019 (COVID-19) caused by severe acute respiratory syndrome coronavirus 2 (SARS-CoV-2). The COVID-19 pandemic was confirmed to have reached the Central African Republic in March 2020.

== Background ==
On 12 January 2020, the World Health Organization (WHO) confirmed that a novel coronavirus was the cause of a respiratory illness in a cluster of people in Wuhan City, Hubei Province, China, which was reported to the WHO on 31 December 2019.

The case fatality ratio for COVID-19 has been much lower than SARS of 2003, but the transmission has been significantly greater, with a significant total death toll. Model-based simulation for the Central African Republic indicates that the 95% confidence interval for the time-varying reproduction number R_{t} exceeded 1.0 between November 2020 and March 2021.

There are only three ventilators in the entire country.

== Timeline ==
Cases

Deaths

=== March 2020 ===
- The country's first case was announced on 14 March, with the patient being identified as a 74-year-old Italian man who returned to the Central African Republic from Milan, Italy.
- There were six confirmed cases in March, with no recoveries and no deaths.

=== April to December 2020 ===
- In April there were 44 new cases, in May 961, in June 2734, in July 863, in August 103, in September 118, in October 37, in November 52, and in December 45. The total number of cases stood at 50 in April, 1011 in May, 3745 in June, 4608 in July, 4711 in August, 4829 in September, 4866 in October, 4918 in November, and 4963 in December.
- Ten patients recovered in April, leaving 40 active cases at the end of the month. The number of recovered patients increased to 23 in May, 787 in June, 1606 in July, 1914 in September, 1924 in October, and 1929 in November, leaving 40 active cases at the end of April, 986 at the end of May, 2911 at the end of June, 2943 at the end of July, 2859 at the end of August, 2853 at the end of September, 2880 at the end of October, 2926 at the end of November, and 2976 at the end of December.
- The first two deaths occurred in May. The death toll rose to 47 in June, 59 in July, 62 in August, and 63 in November.

=== January to December 2021 ===
- 60,000 doses of the Oxford–AstraZeneca COVID-19 vaccine were delivered through COVAX and the national vaccination campaign started on 20 May.
- There were 7,200 confirmed cases in 2021, bringing the total number of cases to 12,163. 38 persons died in 2021, bringing the total death toll to 101. At the end of 2021 there were 744 active cases.
- Modeling carried out by the WHO's Regional Office for Africa suggests that due to under-reporting, the true cumulative number of infections by the end of 2021 was around 2.1 million while the true number of COVID-19 deaths was around one thousand.

=== January to December 2022 ===
- There were 3,194 confirmed cases in 2022, bringing the total number of cases to 15,357. 12 persons died, bringing the total death toll to 113. At the end of 2022 there were 597 active cases.

=== January to December 2023 ===
- There were 83 confirmed cases in 2023, bringing the total number of cases to 15,440. 585 patients recovered in 2023. The death toll remained unchanged. At the end of 2023 there were 127 active cases.

== See also ==
- COVID-19 pandemic in Africa
- COVID-19 pandemic by country and territory
- COVID-19 vaccination in the Central African Republic
