= United Nations Security Council Resolution 1136 =

UN Security Council Resolution 1136
- Flag of the Central African Republic
- Date: 6 November 1997
- Meeting no.: 3,829
- Code: S/RES/1136 (Document)
- Subject: The situation in Central African Republic
- Voting summary: 15 voted for; None voted against; None abstained
- Result: Adopted

Security Council composition
- Permanent members: China; France; Russia; United Kingdom; United States
- Non-permanent members: Chile; Costa Rica; Egypt; Guinea-Bissau; Japan; Kenya; South Korea; Poland; Portugal; Sweden

United Nations Security Council resolution 1136, adopted unanimously on 6 November 1997, after recalling Resolution 1125 (1997) regarding the situation in the Central African Republic, the Council authorised the continuation of the Inter-African Mission to Monitor the Implementation of the Bangui Agreements (MISAB) mission in the country for a further three months.

The MISAB monitoring mission of African countries was commended by the security council for its contributions towards stabilising the Central African Republic. It stressed for the need of all the parties to the Bangui Agreements to implement them fully.

Under Chapter VII of the United Nations Charter, countries participating in MISAB were authorised to ensure the security and freedom of movement of their personnel for a further three months. The Secretary-General Kofi Annan was asked to establish a fund in which Member States could financially contribute to MISAB. Within three months, he was also instructed to report to the council on the implementation of the current resolution and recommendations for further international assistance to the Central African Republic.

== See also ==
- History of the Central African Republic
- List of United Nations Security Council Resolutions 1101 to 1200 (1997–1998)
