= United Nations Security Council Resolution 1125 =

UN Security Council Resolution 1125
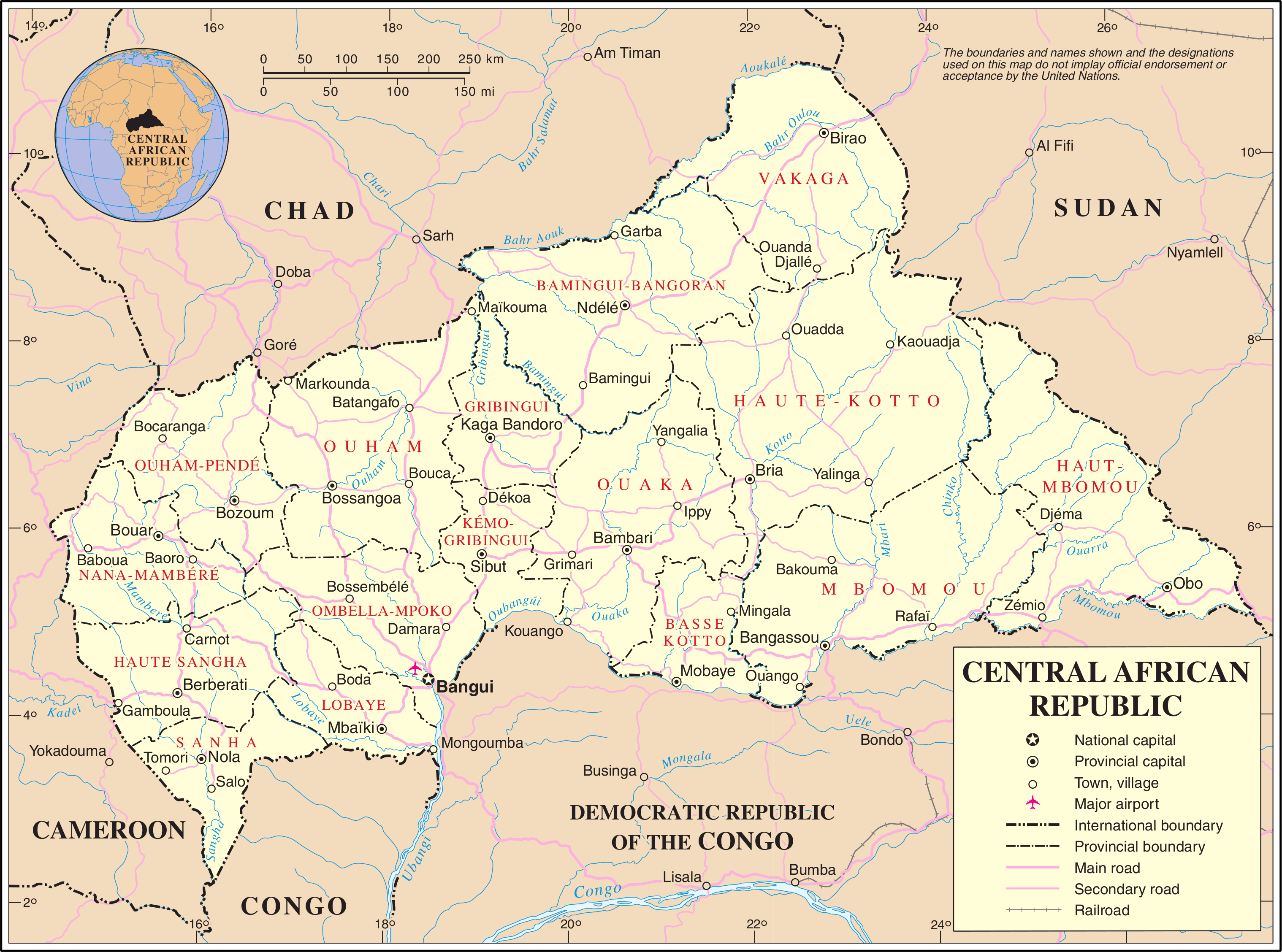
- The Central African Republic
- Date: 6 August 1997
- Meeting no.: 3,808
- Code: S/RES/1125 (Document)
- Subject: The situation in Central African Republic
- Voting summary: 15 voted for; None voted against; None abstained
- Result: Adopted

Security Council composition
- Permanent members: China; France; Russia; United Kingdom; United States
- Non-permanent members: Chile; Costa Rica; Egypt; Guinea-Bissau; Japan; Kenya; South Korea; Poland; Portugal; Sweden

United Nations Security Council resolution 1125, adopted unanimously on 6 August 1997, after expressing concern at the situation facing the Central African Republic, the Council authorised the continuation of the Inter-African Mission to Monitor the Implementation of the Bangui Agreements (MISAB) mission in the country for a further three months.

== Background ==
In 1996, there were three successive mutinies by elements of the armed forces in the Central African Republic which resulted in a political and military crisis. The Bangui Agreements were signed by the President of the Central African Republic Ange-Félix Patassé and rebel forces in the capital Bangui and an inter-African force (MISAB) was established to restore peace and security in the country and to monitor the implementation of the Bangui Agreements.

== Resolution ==
The Security Council determined that the situation in the Central African Republic constituted a threat to international peace and security and welcomed the efforts of states participating in MISAB. It approved the efforts of the operation in securing a stable environment and supervising the surrendering of arms of former mutineers, militias and other persons.

Acting under Chapter VII of the United Nations Charter, countries participating in MISAB – Burkina Faso, Chad, Gabon, Mali, Senegal and Togo – to guarantee the safety and freedom of movement of their personnel for an initial period of three months. The cost of the force would be borne on the participating states. Finally, the participating countries were required to submit reports every two weeks to the Secretary-General Kofi Annan.

== See also ==
- List of United Nations Security Council Resolutions 1101 to 1200 (1997–1998)
