= History of the Central African Republic =

The history of the Central African Republic is roughly composed of four distinct periods. The earliest period of settlement began around 10,000 years ago when nomadic people first began to settle, farm and fish in the region. The next period began around 10,000 years prior.

== Early history ==
Approximately 10,000 years ago, desertification forced hunter-gatherer societies south into the Sahel regions of northern Central Africa, where some groups settled and began farming as part of the Neolithic Revolution. Initial farming of white yam progressed into millet and sorghum, and then later the domestication of African oil palm improved the groups' nutrition and allowed for expansion of the local populations. Bananas arrived in the region and added an important source of carbohydrates to the diet; they were also used in the production of alcohol. This Agricultural Revolution, combined with a "Fish-stew Revolution", in which fishing began to take place, and the use of boats, allowed for the transportation of goods. Products were often moved in ceramic pots, which are the first known examples of artistic expression from the region's inhabitants.

The Bouar Megaliths in the western region of the country indicate an advanced level of habitation dating back to the very late Neolithic era (c. 3500–1700 BC). Ironworking arrived in the region by around 1000 BC, likely from early Bantu cultures in what is today southeast Nigeria and/or Cameroon. The site of Gbabiri (in the Central African Republic) has yielded evidence of iron metallurgy, from a reduction furnace and blacksmith workshop; with earliest dates of 896–173 BC and 907–196 BC respectively. Some earlier iron metallurgy dates of 2,000 BC from the site of Oboui (also in the Central Africa Republic) have also been proposed, but these are disputed by some archaeologists.

During the Bantu Migrations from about 1000 BC to AD 1000, Ubangian-speaking people spread eastward from Cameroon to Sudan, Bantu-speaking people settled in the southwestern regions of the CAR, and Central Sudanic-speaking people settled along the Ubangi River in what is today Central and East CAR.

Production of copper, salt, dried fish, and textiles dominated the economic trade in the Central African region.

The territory of modern Central African Republic is known to have been settled from at least the 7th century on by overlapping empires, including the Kanem-Bornu, Ouaddai, Baguirmi, and Dafour groups based on the Lake Chad region and along the Upper Nile.

== Early modern history ==
During the 16th and 17th centuries Muslim slave traders began to raid the region and their captives were shipped to the Mediterranean coast, Europe, Arabia, the Western Hemisphere, or to the slave ports and factories along the West African coast. During the 18th century Bandia-Nzakara peoples established the Bangassou Kingdom along the Ubangi river.

Population migration in the 18th and 19th centuries brought new migrants into the area, including the Zande, Banda, and Baya-Mandjia. The slave state of Dar al-Kuti was located on the northern extreme of the modern border, it existed this way until they were brought under French colonial rule in the late 19th century.

== Colonial period ==
The European occupation of Central African territory began in the late 19th century during the Scramble for Africa. Count Savorgnan de Brazza established the French Congo and sent expeditions up the Ubangi River from Brazzaville in an effort to expand France's claims to territory in Central Africa. Belgium, Germany, and the United Kingdom also competed to establish their claims to territory in the region. In 1875, the Sudanese sultan Rabih az-Zubayr governed Upper-Oubangui, which included present-day Central African Republic. Europeans, primarily the French, German, and Belgians, arrived in the area in 1885.

The French asserted their legal claim to the area through an 1887 convention with Congo Free State (privately owned by Leopold II of Belgium), which accepted France possession of the right bank of the Oubangui River. In 1889, the French established a trading post on the Ubangi River at Bangui. In 1890–91, de Brazza sent expeditions up the Sangha River, in what is now south-western CAR, up the center of the Ubangi basin toward Lake Chad, and eastward along the Ubangi River toward the Nile, with the intention of expanding the borders of the French Congo to link up the other French territories in Africa. In 1894, the French Congo's borders with Leopold II of Belgium's Congo Free State and German Cameroon were fixed by diplomatic agreements, and France declared Ubangi-Shari to be a French territory.

=== Consolidation ===
In 1899, the French Congo's border with Sudan was fixed along the Congo-Nile divide. This situation left France without her much coveted outlet on the Nile.

In 1900, the French defeated the forces of Rabih az-Zubayr in the 1900 Battle of Kousséri, but they did not consolidate their control over Ubangi-Shari until 1903 when they established colonial administration throughout the territory.

Once European negotiators had agreed upon the borders of the French Congo, France had to decide how to pay for the costly occupation, administration, and development of the territory it had acquired. The reported financial successes of Leopold II's concessionary companies in the Congo Free State convinced the French government to follow suit in Ubangi-Shari. A total of 27 concessionary companies were established in Ubangi-Shari, throughout the Oubangi basin and Ouham basin. In return for the right to exploit these lands by buying local products and selling European goods, the companies promised to pay rent to the colony and to promote the development of their concessions, including the establishment of customs posts, telegraph lines and the plantation of rubber plants. The companies employed European and African agents who frequently used brutal methods to force the natives to labor.

At the same time, the French colonial administration began to force the local population to pay taxes and to provide the state with free labor. The companies and the French administration at times collaborated in forcing the Central Africans to work for them. Some French officials reported abuses committed by private company militias, and their own colonial colleagues and troops, but efforts to hold these people accountable almost invariably failed. When any news of atrocities committed against Central Africans reached France and caused an outcry, investigations were undertaken and some feeble attempts at reform were made, but the situation on the ground in Ubangi-Shari remained virtually unchanged.

In 1906, the Ubangi-Shari territory was united with the Chad colony; in 1910, it became one of the four territories of the Federation of French Equatorial Africa (AEF), along with Chad, Middle Congo, and Gabon.

During the first decade of French colonial rule, from about 1900 to 1910, the rulers of the Ubangi-Shari region increased both their slave-raiding activities and the selling of local produce to Europe. They took advantage of their treaties with the French to procure more weapons, which were used to capture more slaves: much of the eastern half of Ubangi-Shari was depopulated as a result of slave-trading by local rulers during the first decade of colonial rule. After the power of local African rulers was destroyed by the French, slave raiding greatly diminished

In 1911, the Sangha and Lobaye basins were ceded to Germany as part of an agreement which gave France a free hand in Morocco. Western Ubangi-Shari remained under German rule until World War I, after which France again annexed the territory using Central African troops.

The next thirty years were marked by mostly small scale revolts against French rule and the development of a plantation-style economy. From 1920 to 1930, a network of roads was built, cash crops were promoted and mobile health services were formed to combat sleeping sickness. Protestant missions were established in different parts of the country. New forms of forced labor were also introduced, however, as the French conscripted large numbers of Ubangians to work on the Congo-Ocean Railway; many of these recruits died of exhaustion and illness as a result of the poor conditions.

In 1925, the French writer André Gide published Voyage au Congo, in which he described the alarming consequences of conscription for the Congo-Ocean railroad. He exposed the continuing atrocities committed against Central Africans in Western Ubangi-Shari by such employers as the Forestry Company of Sangha-Ubangi. In 1928, a major insurrection, the Kongo-Wara rebellion or 'war of the hoe handle', broke out in Western Ubangi-Shari and continued for several years. The extent of this insurrection, which was perhaps the largest anti-colonial rebellion in Africa during the interwar years, was carefully hidden from the French public because it provided evidence of strong opposition to French colonial rule and forced labor.

=== Resistance ===
Although there were numerous smaller revolts, the largest was the Kongo-Wara rebellion. Peaceful opposition to recruitment for railway construction and rubber tapping, mistreatment by European concessionary companies, began in the mid-1920s, and these opposition descended into violence in 1928, when over 350,000 natives rebelled against the colonial administration. Although the primary opposition leader, Karnou, was killed in December 1928, the rebellion was not fully suppressed until 1931.

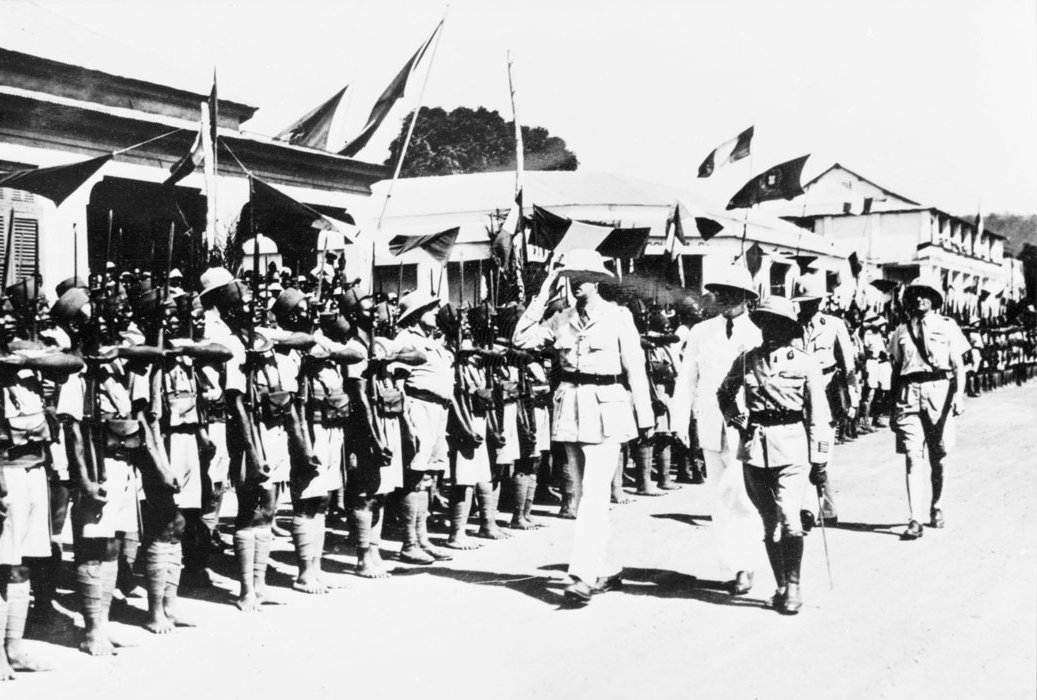
Charles de Gaulle in Bangui, 1940

=== Growing economy and World War II ===
During the 1930s, cotton, tea, and coffee emerged as important cash crops in Ubangi-Shari and the mining of diamonds and gold began in earnest. Several cotton companies were granted purchasing monopolies over large areas of cotton production and were able to fix the prices paid to cultivators, which assured profits for their shareholders.

In September 1940, during the Second World War, pro-Gaullist French officers took control of Ubangi-Shari. In August 1940, the territory responded, with the rest of the AEF, to the call from General Charles de Gaulle to fight for Free France.

=== Post-war transition to independence ===
After World War II, the French Constitution of 1946 inaugurated the first of a series of reforms that led eventually to complete independence for all French territories in western and equatorial Africa. In 1946, all AEF inhabitants were granted French citizenship and allowed to establish local assemblies. The assembly in CAR was led by Barthélemy Boganda, a Catholic priest who also was known for his forthright statements in the French Assembly on the need for African emancipation. In 1956, French legislation eliminated certain voting inequalities and provided for the creation of some organs of self-government in each territory.

The French constitutional referendum of September 1958 dissolved the AEF, and on 1 December of the same year the Assembly declared the birth of the autonomous Central African Republic with Boganda as head of government. Boganda ruled until his death in a plane crash on 29 March 1959. His cousin, David Dacko, replaced him as head of Government. On 12 July 1960 France agreed to the Central African Republic becoming fully independent. On 13 August 1960 the Central African Republic became an independent country and David Dacko became its first president.

== Independence ==
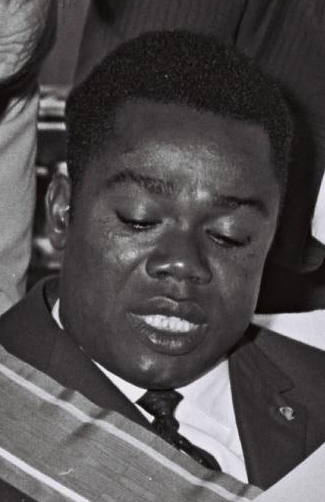
First Central African President David Dacko in 1962

David Dacko began to consolidate his power soon after taking office in 1960. He amended the Constitution to transform his regime into a one-party state with a strong presidency elected for a term of seven years. On 5 January 1964, Dacko was elected in an election in which he ran alone.

During his first term as president, Dacko significantly increased diamond production in the Central African Republic by eliminating the monopoly on mining held by concessionary companies and decreeing that any Central African could dig for diamonds. He also succeeded in having a diamond-cutting factory built in Bangui. Dacko encouraged the rapid "Centralafricanization" of the country's administration, which was accompanied by growing corruption and inefficiency, and he expanded the number of civil servants, which greatly increased the portion of the national budget needed to pay salaries.

Dacko was torn between his need to retain the support of France and his need to show that he was not subservient to France. In order to cultivate alternative sources of support and display his independence in foreign policy, he cultivated closer relations with the People's Republic of China. By 1965, Dacko had lost the support of most Central Africans and may have been planning to resign from the presidency when he was overthrown.

=== Bokassa and the Central African Empire ===
On 1 January 1966, following a swift and almost bloodless overnight coup, Colonel Jean-Bédel Bokassa assumed power as president of the Republic. Bokassa abolished the constitution of 1959, dissolved the National Assembly, and issued a decree that placed all legislative and executive powers in the hands of the president. On 4 March 1972, Bokassa's presidency was extended to a life term. On 4 December 1976, the republic became a monarchy – the Central African Empire – with the promulgation of the imperial constitution and the coronation of the president as Emperor Bokassa I. His authoritarian regime was characterized by numerous human rights violations.

On 20 September 1979, Dacko overthrew Bokassa in a bloodless coup.

=== André Kolingba ===
Dacko's efforts to promote economic and political reforms proved ineffectual, and on 20 September 1981, he in turn was overthrown in a bloodless coup by General André Kolingba. Kolingba suspended the constitution and ruled with a military junta, the Military Committee for National Recovery (CMRN) for four years.

In 1985, the CMRN was dissolved, and André Kolingba named a new cabinet with increased civilian participation, signaling the start of a return to civilian rule. The process of democratization quickened in 1986 with the creation of a new political party, the Rassemblement Démocratique Centrafricain (RDC), and the drafting of a new constitution that subsequently was ratified in a national referendum. General André Kolingba was sworn in as constitutional president on 29 November 1986. The constitution established a National Assembly made up of 52 elected deputies, elected in July 1987. Municipal elections were held in 1988. Kolingba's two major political opponents, Abel Goumba and Ange-Félix Patassé, boycotted these elections because their parties were not allowed to participate.

By 1990, inspired by the fall of the Berlin Wall, a pro-democracy movement became very active. In May 1990, a letter signed by 253 prominent citizens asked for the convocation of a National Conference. André Kolingba refused this request and instead detained several opponents. Pressure from a group of locally represented countries and agencies called GIBAFOR (Groupe informel des bailleurs de fonds et representants residents), the United States, France, Japan, Germany, EU, World Bank and the UN finally led André Kolingba to agree, in principle, to hold free elections in October 1992.

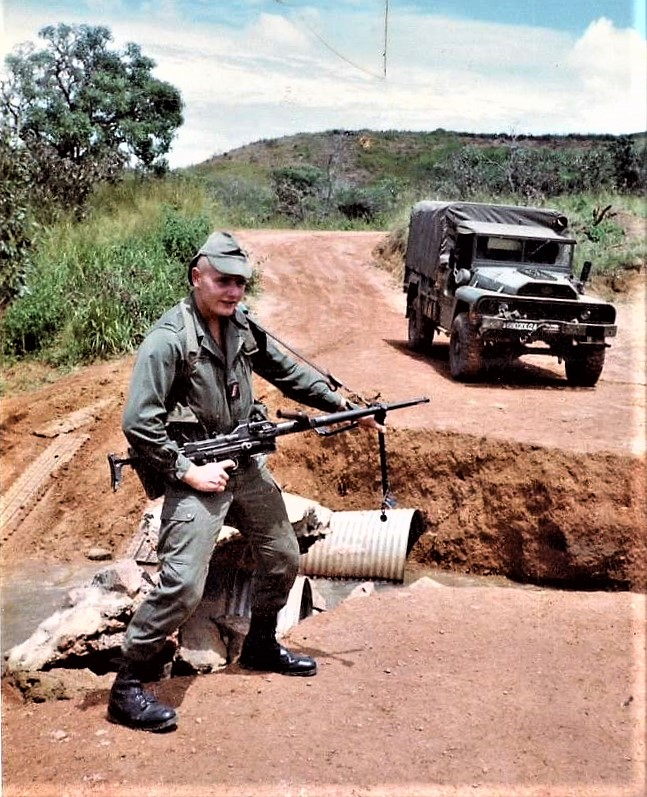
A soldier with France's 11th Marine Artillery Regiment during military exercises in the Central African Republic in 1992

Alleging irregularities, André Kolingba opted to suspend the results of the elections and held on to power. GIBAFOR applied intense pressure on him to establish a Provisional National Political Council (Conseil National Politique Provisoire de la République / CNPPR) and to set up a "Mixed Electoral Commission", which included representatives from all political parties.

=== Ange-Félix Patassé ===
When elections were finally held in 1993, again with the help of the international community and the UN Electoral Assistance Unit, Ange-Félix Patassé led in the first round and Kolingba came in fourth behind Abel Goumba and David Dacko. In the second round, Patassé won 53% of the vote while Goumba won 45.6%. Most of Patassé's support came from Gbaya, Kare, and Kaba voters in seven heavily populated prefectures in the northwest while Goumba's support came largely from ten less populated prefectures in the south and east. Patassé's party, the Mouvement pour la Libération du Peuple Centrafricain (MLPC) or Movement for the Liberation of the Central African People, gained a plurality but not an absolute majority of seats in parliament, which meant it required coalition partners to rule effectively.

Patassé relieved former president Kolingba of his military rank of General in March 1994 and then charged several former ministers with various crimes. Ange-Félix Patassé also removed many Yakoma from important, lucrative posts in the government. Two hundred predominantly Yakoma members of the presidential guard were also dismissed or reassigned to the army. Kolingba's RDC loudly proclaimed that Patassé's government was conducting a "witch hunt" against the Yakoma.

A new constitution was approved on 28 December 1994 and promulgated on 14 January 1995, but this constitution, like those before it, did not have much impact on the country's politics. In 1996–1997, reflecting steadily decreasing public confidence in the government's erratic behaviour, three mutinies against Patassé's administration were accompanied by widespread destruction of property and heightened ethnic tension.

On 25 January 1997, the Bangui Agreements, which provided for the deployment of an inter-African military mission, the Mission Interafricaine de Surveillance des Accords de Bangui (MISAB), were signed. Mali's former president, Amadou Touré, served as chief mediator and brokered the entry of ex-mutineers into the government on 7 April 1997. The MISAB mission was later replaced by a U.N. peacekeeping force, the Mission des Nations Unies en RCA (MINURCA).

In 1998, parliamentary elections resulted in Kolingba's RDC winning 20 out of 109 seats, constituting a significant political comeback. In 1999, however, Patassé won free elections to become president for a second term, despite widespread public anger in urban centres over his rule.

=== François Bozizé ===
On 28 May 2001, rebels stormed strategic buildings in Bangui in an unsuccessful coup attempt. The army chief of staff, Abel Abrou, and General François N'Djadder Bedaya were killed, but Patasse retained power with the assistance of troops from Libya and rebel FLC soldiers from the DRC led by Jean-Pierre Bemba.

In the aftermath of the failed coup, militias loyal to Patassé sought revenge against rebels in many neighborhoods of the capital, Bangui. They incited unrest which resulted in the destruction of homes as well as the torture and murder of opponents.

Patassé came to suspect that General François Bozizé was involved in another coup attempt against him, which led Bozizé to flee with loyal troops to Chad. In March 2003, François Bozizé launched a surprise attack against Patassé, who was out of the country. This time, Libyan troops and some 1,000 soldiers of Bemba's Congolese rebel organization failed to stop the rebels, who took control of the country and thus succeeded in overthrowing Patassé. On 15 March 2003, rebels moved into Bangui and installed their François Bozizé, as president.

Patassé was found guilty of major crimes in Bangui. CAR brought a case against him and Jean-Pierre Bemba to the International Criminal Court, accusing them both of multiple crimes in suppressing one of the mutinies against Patasse.

Bozizé's won the 2005 presidential election, and his coalition was the leader in the 2005 legislative election.

==== 2003–2007: Bush War ====
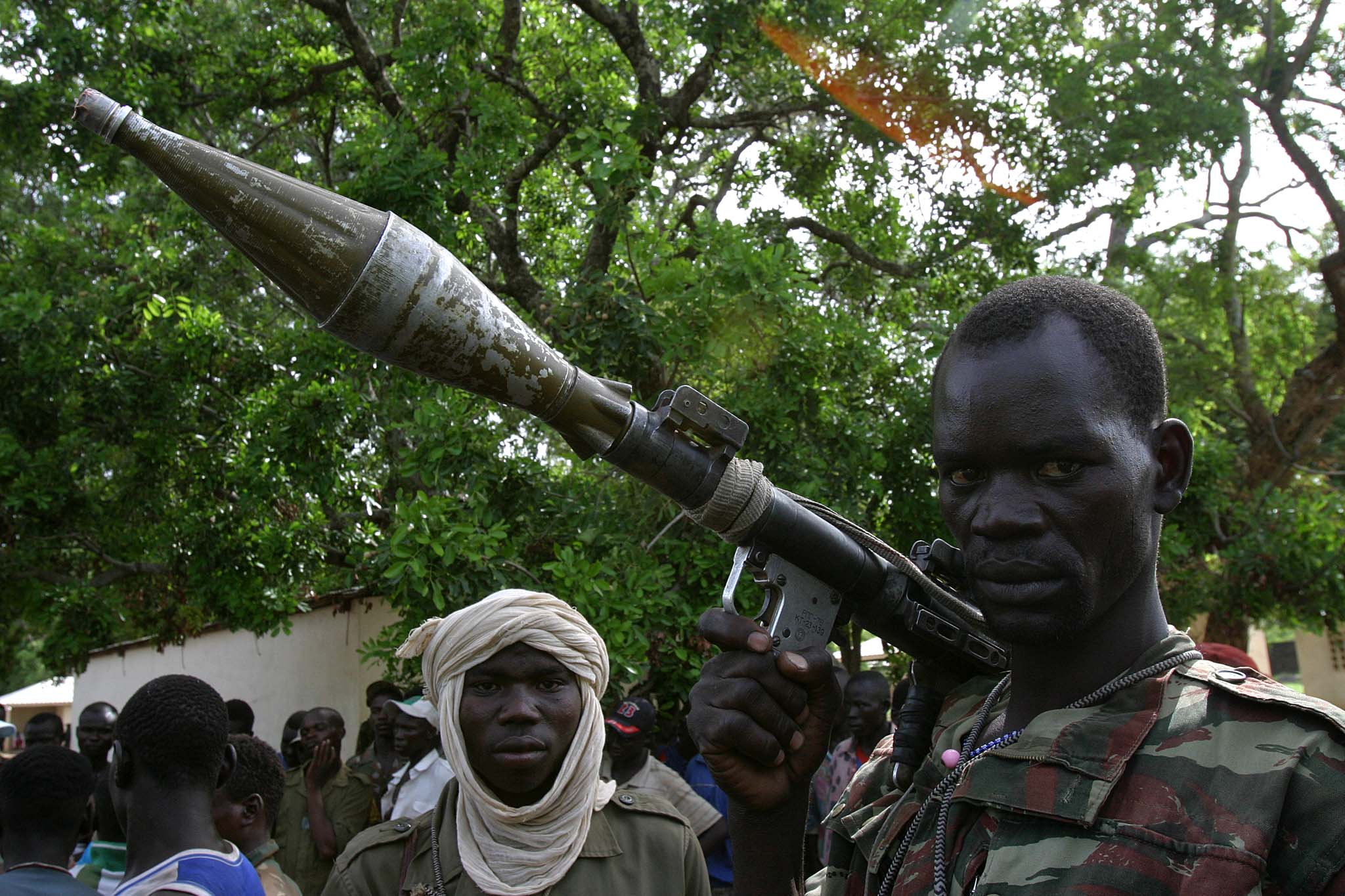
Rebel in northern Central African Republic in 2007.

After François Bozizé seized power in 2003, the Central African Republic Bush War began with the rebellion by the Union of Democratic Forces for Unity (UFDR), led by Michel Djotodia. This quickly escalated into major fighting during 2004. The UFDR rebel forces consisted of three allies, the Groupe d'action patriotique pour la liberation de Centrafrique (GAPLC), the Convention of Patriots for Justice and Peace (CPJP), the People's Army for the Restoration of Democracy (APRD), the Movement of Central African Liberators for Justice (MLCJ), and the Front démocratique Centrafricain (FDC).

In early 2006, Bozizé's government appeared stable.

On 13 April 2007, a peace agreement between the government and the UFDR was signed in Birao. The agreement provided for an amnesty for the UFDR, its recognition as a political party, and the integration of its fighters into the army. Further negotiations resulted in an agreement in 2008 for reconciliation, a unity government, and local elections in 2009 and parliamentary and presidential elections in 2010. The new unity government that resulted was formed in January 2009.

=== 2012–2014: Civil War ===
Séléka advances in C.A.R. (December 2012–March 2013)

In late 2012, a coalition of old rebel groups under new name of Séléka renewed fighting. Two other, previously unknown groups, the Alliance for Revival and Rebuilding (A2R) and the Patriotic Convention for Saving the Country (CPSK) also joined the coalition, as well as the Chadian group FPR.

On 27 December 2012, CAR President François Bozizé requested international assistance to help with the rebellion, in particular from France and the United States. French President François Hollande rejected the plea, saying that the 250 French troops stationed at Bangui M'Poko International Airport are there "in no way to intervene in the internal affairs".

On 11 January 2013, a ceasefire agreement was signed Libreville, Gabon. The rebels dropped their demand for President François Bozizé to resign, but he had to appoint a new prime minister from the opposition party by 18 January 2013. On 13 January, Bozizé signed a decree that removed Prime Minister Faustin-Archange Touadéra from power, as part of the agreement with the rebel coalition. On 17 January, Nicolas Tiangaye was appointed prime minister.

On 24 March 2013, rebel forces heavily attacked the capital Bangui and took control of major structures, including the presidential palace. Bozizé's family fled across the river to the Democratic Republic of the Congo and then to Yaoundé, the capital of Cameroon where he was granted temporary refuge.

==== Djotodia ====
Séléka leader Michel Djotodia declared himself president. Djotodia said that there would be a three-year transitional period and that Tiangaye would continue to serve as prime minister. Djotodia promptly suspended the constitution and dissolved the government, as well as the National Assembly. He then reappointed Tiangaye as prime minister on 27 March 2013. Top military and police officers met with Djotodia and recognized him as president on 28 March 2013. Catherine Samba-Panza assumed the office of interim president on 23 January 2014.

Peacekeeping largely transitioned from the Economic Community of Central African States-led MICOPAX to the African Union-led MISCA, which was deployed in December 2013. In September 2014, MISCA transferred its authority to the UN-led MINUSCA while the French peacekeeping mission was known as Operation Sangaris.

=== 2015 – Present: Civil War ===
By 2015, there was little government control outside of the capital, Bangui. The dissolution of Séléka led to ex-Séléka fighters forming new militias that often fought each other.

Armed entrepreneurs had carved out personal fiefdoms in which they set up checkpoints, collect illegal taxes, and take in millions of dollars from the illicit coffee, mineral, and timber trades. Noureddine Adam, the leader of the rebel group Popular Front for the Rebirth of Central African Republic (FRPC), declared the autonomous Republic of Logone on 14 December 2015. By 2017, more than 14 armed groups vied for territory, and about 60% of the country's territory was controlled by four notable factions led by ex-Séléka leaders, including the FRP led by Adam; the Union Pour la Paix en Centrafrique (UPC), led by Ali Darassa, the Mouvement patriotique pour la Centrafrique (MPC) led by Mahamat Al-Khatim. The factions have been described as ethnic in nature with the FPRC associated with the Gula and Runga people and the UPC associated with the Fulani. With the de facto partition of the country between ex-Séléka militias in the north and east, and Anti-balaka militias in the south and west, hostilities between both sides decreased but sporadic fighting continued.

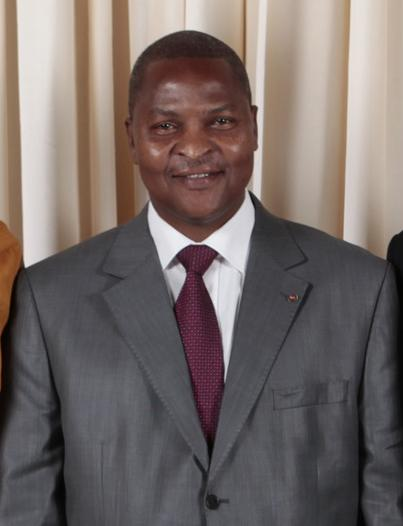
Faustin Touadera succeeded interim head Catherine Samba-Panza to become president following the 2015–16 elections

In February 2016, after a peaceful election, the former prime minister Faustin-Archange Touadéra was elected president. In October 2016, France announced that Operation Sangaris, its peacekeeping mission in the country, was a success and largely withdrew its troops.

Tensions erupted in competition between ex-Séléka militias arising over control of a goldmine in November 2016, where a coalition formed by the MPC and the FPRC (incorporating elements of their former enemy, the Anti-balaka) attacked the UPC.

==== Conflict in Ouaka ====
Most of the fighting was in the centrally located Ouaka prefecture, which has the country's second largest city Bambari, because of its strategic location between the Muslim and Christian regions of the country and its wealth. The fight for Bambari in early 2017 displaced 20,000. MINUSCA made a robust deployment to prevent FPRC taking the city. In February 2017, Joseph Zoundeiko, the chief of staff of FPRC was killed by MINUSCA after crossing one of the red lines. At the same time, MINUSCA negotiated the removal of Darassa from the city. This led to UPC to find new territory, spreading the fighting from urban to rural areas previously spared.

The thinly spread MINUSCA relied on Ugandan as well as American special forces to keep the peace in the southeast as they were part of a campaign to eliminate the Lord's Resistance Army but the mission ended in April 2017. By the latter half of 2017, the fighting largely shifted to the Southeast where the UPC reorganized and were pursued by the FPRC and Anti-balaka with the level of violence only matched by the early stage of the war. About 15,000 people fled from their homes in an attack in May and six U.N. peacekeepers were killed – the deadliest month for the mission yet.

In June 2017, another ceasefire was signed in Rome by the government and 14 armed groups including FPRC but the next day fighting between an FPRC faction and Anti-balaka militias killed more than 100 people. In October 2017, another ceasefire was signed between the UPC, the FPRC, and Anti-balaka groups. The FPRC announced Ali Darassa as coalition vice-president but fighting continued afterward. By July 2018, the FPRC, now headed by Abdoulaye Hissène and based in the northeastern town of Ndélé, had troops threatening to move onto Bangui. Further clashes between the UPC and MINUSCA/government forces occurred early in 2019.

==== Conflicts in Western and Northwestern CAR ====
In Western CAR, a new rebel group called Return, Reclamation, Rehabilitation (3R), with no known links to Séléka or Anti-balaka, formed in 2015. Self-proclaimed General Sidiki Abass claimed 3R would protect Muslim Fulani people from an Antibalaka militia led by Abbas Rafal. 3R are accused of displacing 17,000 people in November 2016 and at least 30,000 people in the Ouham-Pendé prefecture in December 2016.

For some time, Northwestern CAR, around Paoua, was divided between Revolution and Justice (RJ) and Movement for the Liberation of the Central African Republic (MNLC), but fighting erupted after the killing of RJ leader, Clément Bélanga, in November 2017. The conflict displaced 60,000 people since December 2017. The MNLC, founded in October 2017, was led by Ahamat Bahar, a former member and co-founder of FPRC and MRC, and is allegedly backed by Fulani fighters from Chad. The Christian militant group RJ was formed in 2013, mostly by members of the presidential guard of former president Ange Felix Patassé, and were composed mainly of ethnic Sara-Kaba.

==== 2020s ====
In December 2020, President Faustin Archange Touadéra was reelected in the first round of the presidential election. The opposition did not accept the result because of allegations of fraud and irregularities. Russian mercenaries from the Wagner Group have supported President Faustin-Archange Touadéra in the fight against rebels. Russia's Wagner group has been accused of harassing and intimidating civilians.

== See also ==
- Brazzaville Conference
- French Equatorial Africa
- History of Central Africa
- Ubangi-Shari
