= Bokassa (disambiguation) =

Bokassa may refer to:

== People ==
- Jean-Bédel Bokassa (1921–1996), Central African Republic and Central African Empire political and military leader
- Jean-Bédel Bokassa Jr. (born 1973), son of Central African Republican dictator Jean-Bédel Bokassa
- Jean-Barthélémy Bokassa (born 1974), French-Central African socialite, artist and novelist
- Jean-Serge Bokassa (born 1972), Central African politician and minister, son of Jean-Bédel Bokassa
- Kiki Bokassa (born 1975), French-born autodidact conceptual artist, daughter of Jean-Bédel Bokassa

== Others ==
- Bokassa (band), a Norwegian rock band
- House of Bokassa, an African imperial dynasty founded by Jean-Bédel Bokassa
