= Saint-Louis Photography Museum =

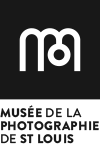
- Established: November 25, 2017; 7 years ago
- Location: Rue Ibrahima Sarr, Île Sud, Saint-Louis, Senegal
- Coordinates: 16.023899°N 16.505380°W
- Type: Photography museum
- Founder: Amadou Diaw
- Website: www.muphost-louis.com

The Saint-Louis Photography Museum (French: Musée de la Photographie de Saint-Louis) is a museum located in Saint-Louis, Senegal. It is the first museum in Senegal dedicated to photography.

== History ==
The museum was founded by Amadou Diaw, who also founded the Saint-Louis Forum and Dakar Management Higher Institute, with the intention of preserving the architectural heritage of the city. One of the reasons the museum was opened was to pay tribute to photographers such as Mama Casset and Meissa Gaye. The museum building is in the typical post-20th century architecture style of the island of Saint-Louis. The museum was opened in November 2017. In a 2018 interview with the museum's director at the time, Salimata Diop, the city of Saint-Louis was chosen to site the museum because of the city's history with photography, in which the first camera sent to Senegal was received by this city in 1863 by the Ministry of Marine and Colonial Affairs.

== Collections ==
The museum has exhibited photographs from Amadou Diaw's personal collection as well as photographs from the early days of Saint-Louis. The museum has a diverse collection of photographs from various African countries. It contains photographs of the 1977 crowning of emperor Jean-Bédel Bokassa and of Senegal's beauty dating back to the 1930s. The museum has a contemporary photography section, with photos by Malika Diagana, Joana Choumali, Fabrice Monteiro, and Omar Victor Diop. The museum contains black-and-white portraits of Senegalese women between the 1930s and 1950s; the exhibition is entitled "Reveries of Yesterday, Dreams of the Present" (French: Rêveries d’Hier, Songes du Présent). The museum has also exhibited photographs by Siaka Soppo Traoré, Malick Welli, Mário Macilau, Laeila Adjovi, and David Uzochukwu. The museum contains a collection of photographs from the golden age of photo studios in Saint-Louis. In 2018, the museum organized an exhibition dedicated to the Ghanaian photographer James Barnor.
