= Operation Caban =

1979 French military operation in the Central African Republic

1979 Central African coup d'état
Date	19–20 September 1979
Location	Bangui, Central African Empire (now Central African Republic)
Result	Coup succeeds.: Bokassa I is exiled.; The Central African Empire is overthrown.; The Central African Republic is restored.

Belligerents
Central African Empire	(Central African Republic) Armed Forces rebels France

Commanders and leaders
(Central African Empire) Bokassa I	(Central African Republic) David Dacko (France) Valéry Giscard d'Estaing

Operation Caban, also known as the 1979 Central African coup d’état, was a bloodless military operation by the French intelligence service SDECE in September 1979 to depose Emperor Bokassa I of the Central African Empire, reinstate the exiled former president David Dacko, and restore the Central African Republic.

== History ==
Throughout most of Bokassa's reign as president and emperor, he had maintained good relations with France. This was exemplified by French president Valéry Giscard d'Estaing receiving diamonds from Bokassa in 1973 (which later turned into a political scandal) as well as substantial material support to Bokassa's lavish coronation ceremony in 1977.

However, a combination of factors created a rift between France and the Central African Empire. Firstly, Bokassa was seeking a closer alliance with Libyan leader Muammar Gaddafi. This led to a fear that French interests in the country could be threatened. Alexandre de Marenches, head of the French intelligence service SDECE, later stated that France aimed to "ensure that the Libyans did not establish a position in the center of Africa", a point that was also brought up by Giscard d'Estaing. The Chadian–Libyan War exacerbated the strategic importance of the Central African Empire to France. In this context, Bokassa was perceived as an increasingly unreliable ally, although up to 1979 the French saw appeasement as the best strategy to protect the stability of their position. However, this changed as internal opposition to the Empire mounted.

By January 1979, Emperor Bokassa had become a widely resented autocrat. His fall was precipitated by a decree that all high school students must buy uniforms from a business owned by one of his wives. This led to protests by students in Bangui and rocks thrown at the Emperor's car. In April 1979, Bokassa called in the Central African Armed Forces to put down the agitation and arrest the teenage students. During the following two days, about 100 students were brutally killed in the Ngaragba Prison massacre, which became known as the "Bangui children's massacre". It was even reported that Bokassa personally participated in beatings and torture.

The widely publicized atrocities made it hard for Giscard to maintain his support to the Central African Empire with respect to the public opinion. The president's counsellor on African affairs, René Journiac, met with Bokassa in July 1979 and tried to convince him to abdicate; however, the emperor angrily refused and "briefly threatened to beat Journiac with his cane". In August 1979 a panel of investigators, selected by other African states, found that Bokassa was complicit in the massacres, which further damaged his international legitimacy. By that time the French were already planning to remove him by force.

Giscard discussed this plan with his prominent African allies Senghor and Bongo, the presidents of respectively Senegal and Gabon. They agreed to launch a coup to overthrow Bokassa and reinstall former president David Dacko, who was then in exile in Europe. As historian Brian Titley pointed out, deposing Bokassa was only part of the coup; equally important was hand-picking a successor who could be trusted to serve French interests in the country. France had vetoed any figures with Marxist or leftist views, such as Abel Goumba, as well as those it deemed untrustworthy, including Ange-Félix Patassé and Sylvestre Bangui. Prime minister Henri Maïdou was considered, but the French eventually favored Dacko due to Maïdou's current connection to the Bokassa government.

France was careful to organize the coup in such a way that it was not perceived as an unprompted French invasion. To ensure this, Dacko had to be transported to Bangui and would "request" assistance in carrying out the overthrow of Bokassa, prior to the actual arrival of foreign troops. After Giscard rejected a proposal to use mercenaries to safely escort Dacko, the French settled on a central role for the SDECE. A commando squad linked to the latter, joined by the 1st Marine Infantry Parachute Regiment, flew Dacko into Bangui on 19 September 1979 through the international airport. At the time, Bokassa was on a state visit to Libya. Prime minister Maïdou had been the one to inform France of Bokassa's landing in Tripoli.

The SDECE commando escorted Dacko from the airport to the radio station. There, shortly before midnight, he broadcast a message denouncing Bokassa and proclaiming the Empire's overthrow. It was only minutes after Dacko proclaimed his message that French troops invaded the country from Gabon and Chad. The operation was completed within a matter of hours without a shot being fired: Central African soldiers across Bangui immediately surrendered, whereas the imperial guards at Berengo left for their villages. Neither the French embassy in Bangui nor the Ministry of Foreign Affairs were aware of it until it was over. As a result of the coup, Dacko successfully reclaimed the presidency after his 13-year absence and the country was again renamed to the Central African Republic (CAR). Operation Caban was followed by Operation Barracuda, its counterpart carried out by the regular military and troupes de marine (instead of the SDECE) to stabilize the new regime over the course of the next two years, although Alexandre de Marenches used the two codenames interchangeably.

The affair did not bring accolades to France: while many in the CAR supported the coup, many in France including Giscard were criticised for their handling of the situation. It also damaged Chadian trust in France in the context of Opération Tacaud, as noted by historian Nathaniel Powell: "If Giscard could overthrow a formerly close friend and ally, how could the Chadians trust French intentions?" Dacko would not remain in power long, being overthrown himself while on state visit to Libya in a 1981 coup by General André Kolingba.

Bokassa initially fled to France, claiming that his French citizenship authorized him to reside there. However, Journiac convinced Félix Houphouët-Boigny to offer the dethroned emperor exile in Côte d'Ivoire instead. Bokassa returned to the CAR in 1987, where he was immediately arrested and sentenced to death. This was commuted to life in prison a year later. As one of his last acts in office in 1993, Kolingba granted a general amnesty for all prisoners, including Bokassa, who died three years later.

== See also ==
- Operation Barracuda
- Françafrique, a term referring to the continuation of French involvement in its former African colonies
