= Sylvestre Bangui =

Central African diplomat, general, and politician

- Born: 15 March 1934
- Died: 4 June 1996 (aged 62)
- Occupations: General; Diplomat; Politician

Sylvestre Bangui (15 March 1934 – 4 June 1996) was a Central African general, diplomat and politician. He rose amongst the ranks of the Central African Armed Forces to become a general, and was away for military training when Jean-Bédel Bokassa carried out his coup d'état in 1965. Bokassa appointed him as an ambassador, first to Canada and then to France. In 1979, he carried out a press conference where he denounced his government for carrying out a massacre of children, resigned and formed an opposition group. After Bokassa's deposition, he served as the Minister of Foreign Affairs in 1979 and 1980. He also served as the Minister of Economy and Finance in 1983 and 1984.

== Early life and military career ==
Of Mbaka ethnicity, Bangui was born in Mbaïki in the prefecture of Lobaye on 15 March 1934. He served in the French Army between 1957 and 1962, subsequently becoming a second lieutenant in the Central African Army. Between 1965 and 1967 he received military training in the École supérieure de l'Intendance in Paris and was thus not present in the Central African Republic (CAR) during the Saint-Sylvestre coup d'état of Jean-Bédel Bokassa in 1965. Upon his return to the CAR in 1967, he was appointed the Director General of Military Logistics (French: Directeur générale d'intendance militaire). He was promoted to the position of the National Defence Commissar in 1973.

== Ambassadorial career and revelations on the children's massacre ==
Bangui was sent away from the CAR by President Bokassa, serving as the Ambassador of the CAR in Canada between 1973 and 1975. He was appointed as the Central African ambassador in Paris in 1975 (Bokassa renamed the country the Central African Empire in 1976). He tendered his resignation in October 1978 but nonetheless stayed in post as he had received no reply from the Central African government.

Beginning in January 1979, discontent amongst high school (lycée) and university students in Bangui, the Central African capital, led to a series of demonstrations and riots. This culminated in what is known as the Bangui children's massacre: on 18–19 April 1979, Central African authorities arrested hundreds of young students from their homes at night and placed them in the Ngaragba Prison. Here, overcrowded conditions led to some suffocating to death, whilst others were tortured. The true number of deaths remains unknown, at least 18 were confirmed but estimates indicate higher figures. The massacre was first reported by Amnesty International on 14 May, leading to international pressure building up on France to withdraw support for Bokassa.

On 22 May, Sylvestre Bangui held a press conference in Paris. He stated that he had carried out a fact-finding trip to Bangui and gathered eyewitness testimonies, and could confirm that the children's massacre had taken place, and that a death toll of 100 "would not be an exaggeration". He also reported that reliable witnesses had told him that Emperor Bokassa had personally participated in the killing of the students. He resigned his ambassadorial post as well as his military rank, claimed asylum in France and announced his formation of the Ubangian Liberation Front (French: Front de liberation des oubanguiens), an anti-Bokassa opposition group.

== Political career ==
On 11 September 1979, Bangui declared the creation of a Republic of Ubangui and the formation of a provisional government-in-exile from a hotel in Paris, thus placing himself as a potential successor to Bokassa. In the declaration, he stated that his government-in-exile would work to constitute a democratic regime in Central Africa, one that was akin to the government of Senegal. The French government of Valéry Giscard d'Estaing, who had by then resolved to depose Bokassa, did not regard Bangui as an appropriate successor, however. Bangui was known to be close to Jacques Chirac, a rival of Giscard. They were also concerned that his being M'Baka, the same ethnicity as Bokassa, would be a disadvantage, but also they saw him personally as not having "the right stuff" for the Presidency. In the end, David Dacko, the former president, was restored, and Bangui agreed to support him and participate in his government. At the end of 1979, he became the Second Vice-Prime Minister and the Minister of Foreign Affairs. He resigned his post in protest after Dacko dismissed Prime Minister Bernard Ayandho, who had been opposing him. Dacko himself was deposed in a coup by André Kolingba in 1981.

Bangui returned to government under Kolingba, and served as the Minister of Economy and Finance between February 1983 and 23 January 1984. He was dismissed from this post and was placed under house arrest, in which Le Monde reported him as being in 1985.

In October 1992, Bangui decided to put himself forward as a candidate for the upcoming presidential election, but as he did not deposit the mandatory application fee of 5 million francs, his candidacy was never registered. Jacques Serre has remarked that he would not have stood a chance of being elected in the field of candidates for that election. During this period, he also established a new political party, the National Union for the Defense of Democracy (French: L'union nationale pour la défense de la Démocratie), which did not have much success.

Bangui died in Paris on 4 June 1996.
