= Jean-Bédel =

Jean-Bédel is a masculine given name. Notable people with the name include:

- Jean-Bédel Bokassa (1921–1996), Central African politician
- Jean-Bédel Bokassa Jr. (born 1973), son of the above
