= Marie-Reine Hassen =

Central Africa Republic economist and politician

Minister Delegate for Regional Development
- In office 2008 - 2009
- President: François Bozizé

Minister Delegate for the Economy, Planning and International Cooperation
- In office 2007 - 2008
- President: François Bozizé

Minister Delegate for Foreign Affairs
- In office 2006 - 2007
- President: François Bozizé

Central African Goodwill Ambassador to Senegal
- In office 2003 - 2006
- President: François Bozizé
- Born: 1954 (age 71–72); Alindaho, Basse-Kotto, Ubangi-Shari, French Equatorial Africa
- Spouse: Bokassa I
- House: Bokassa (by marriage)
- Father: Mr. Hassen

Marie-Reine Hassen (born 1954 in Alindaho), is an economist, diplomat and politician from the Central African Republic. She was one of the 17 wives of Jean-Bédel Bokassa, CAR dictator. She was a goodwill ambassador in Senegal from 2003 to 2006, Minister Delegate for Foreign Affairs from 2006 to 2007, Minister Delegate for the Economy, Planning and International Cooperation from 2007 to 2008, and then Minister Delegate for Regional Development from 2008 to 2009. She founded the Movement for Rallying and Change. She was a candidate for her country's 2010 presidential election.

== Biography ==
Marie-Reine Hassen was born to a Central African Métis father, a former civil administrator of France in the Overseas Territories and Minister of the Government of David Dacko. He was also a teacher by profession, one of the first in the Central African Republic. After the coup d'état of Jean-Bédel Bokassa, her father was locked up for six years and then fled during a visit to France. The rest of her family tried to flee to Cameroon but was captured and imprisoned at the Ngaragba Central Prison when she was only 14 years old.
