= Jean-Bédel Bokassa Jr. =

Crown Prince of Central Africa

- Crown Prince of Central Africa
- Born: 2 November 1973 (age 52); Bangui, Central African Republic
- House: Bokassa
- Father: Jean-Bédel Bokassa
- Mother: Catherine Denguiadé

Jean-Bédel Bokassa Jr. (born 2 November 1973) is a son of Jean-Bédel Bokassa, the former dictator and emperor of the Central African Republic and its successor state, the Central African Empire, by his sixth wife, Catherine Denguiadé. As a title in pretense, he claims the Imperial throne as Bokassa II.

== Life ==
Following his father's decision to become Emperor of Central Africa, Jean-Bédel Bokassa Jr. was named, at the age of 4, heir apparent with the title of crown prince (prince héritier de Centrafrique). He was chosen despite having several older brothers and half-brothers. Bokassa I's eldest son by another wife, Georges, was a cabinet minister but Bokassa considered him weak. Jean-Bédel Bokassa Jr. was included in his father's lavish coronation of 4 December 1977. Bokassa Jr. attended wearing a white admiral's uniform and was crowned as the heir by his father during the coronation ceremony. In 1979, following the French led Operation Barracuda which led to a coup and the deposition of his father, Bokassa Jr. was removed from his boarding school in Switzerland and was flown to Gabon to join the rest of his family in exile from the Central African Republic.

During 2010, Bokassa Jr. joined his brother Jean-Serge Bokassa in appealing to the Central African Republic government for reconciliation for his late father. The government agreed and granted Bokassa a posthumous pardon with Bokassa Jr. and his siblings agreeing to set up a foundation to fund compensation for victims of Bokassa's crimes whilst he was emperor. He is currently a socialite living in Paris.
