= Jean-Barthélémy Bokassa =

French-Central African socialite

- House: Bokassa
- Father: Dr. Jean-Bruno Dédéavode
- Mother: Martine Nguyen Bokassa
- Education: Paris Dauphine University

Jean-Barthélémy Bokassa (born 30 August 1974 in Bangui, Central African Republic) is a French-Central African socialite, artist and novelist. He is the eldest grandson of Jean-Bédel Bokassa, the 2nd President of the Central African Republic and later the self-proclaimed Emperor Bokassa I of its successor state, the Central African Empire.

== Ancestry ==
Bokassa comes from an influential political family. As a member of the House of Bokassa, he is not simply a descendant of Jean-Bédel Bokassa but also related to former President of the Central African Republic David Dacko and is the great-great nephew of Barthélémy Boganda, the first Prime Minister of the Central African Republic after whom he was named. His mother Martine Nguyen Bokassa, is the sole offspring of Jean-Bedel Bokassa's first marriage to the Vietnamese Nguyen Thi Hué, who married Jean-Bédel Bokassa during the First Indochina War.
