= Coat of arms of the Central African Republic =

- Armiger: Central African Republic
- Adopted: 17 May 1963 (original); 21 September 1979 (readopted)
- Relinquished: 4 December 1976 (original)
- Crest: A golden sun bearing the date December 1st 1958, topped by a ribbon bearing ZO KWE ZO "All People are People"
- Shield: Quarterly; first: vert, an elephant's head cabossed argent; second: argent, a tree eradicated vert; third: Or, three mullets of four points sable, one and two, each charged with a roundel argent; fourth: azure, a hand couped pointing to dexter chief gules. Upon an inescutcheon gules a roundel argent charged with a map of Africa sable surmounted by a mullet Or.
- Supporters: The flag of the Central African Republic
- Motto: Unité, Dignité, Travail "Unity, Dignity, Work"
- Order: Order of Central African Merit

The coat of arms of the Central African Republic consists of a shield in the center, with two flags on its edges, and with a sun rising over the shield. Below and above the shield are banners, and there is the badge of the Order of Central African Merit located below the shield as well.

== Symbolism ==
ZO KWE ZO, the motto in Sango, means "A man is a man" or "All people are people".

The elephant and the baobab tree represent nature and the backbone of the country. The gold star on a map of Africa symbolizes the position of the Central African Republic. The hand (bottom right quarter) was the symbol of the dominant MESAN party in 1963 when the arms were adopted. The bottom left quarter holds three diamonds, which symbolize the mineral resources of the country.

The medal under the shield is the honorific decoration of the Order of Central African Merit.

Within the sun are the words "1^{ER} DECEMBRE 1958".

== Former coats of arms ==
Coat of arms of the Central African Republic
Description The coat of arms of the autonomous republic of Ubangi-Shari and later the independent Central African Republic. Years in use 1958–1963

Coat of arms of the Central African Empire
Description The Imperial coat of arms of the Central African Empire. Years in use 1976–1979

== See also ==
- Coat of arms of the Central African Empire
