= Empress Catherine of Central Africa =

Widow of Jean-Bédel Bokassa

Catherine
- Catherine Denguiadé on the day of her coronation, 1977 © Philippe Ledru/AKG-Images.

Empress consort of Central Africa
- Tenure: 4 December 1976 – 21 September 1979
- Coronation: 4 December 1977

First Lady of the Central African Republic
- In role: 1 January 1966 – 4 December 1976
- Predecessor: Brigette Dacko
- Successor: Herself (as Empress)
- Born: 7 August 1949 (age 77); Sarh, French Chad (now Chad)
- Spouse: Jean-Bédel Bokassa
- Issue: Jean-Bédel Bokassa Jr.
- Father: M. Denguiadé
- Mother: Lucienne Tabedje (born in French Chad)

Catherine (born Catherine Martine Denguiadé, later Bokassa, 7 August 1949) is the former Empress of Central Africa. She is also a member of the deposed House of Bokassa and widow of its former head, Jean-Bédel Bokassa, who reigned as Emperor of Central Africa from 1976–1979. She was one of several wives of Emperor Bokassa but she became the Empress when he created the Central African Empire. Her son was chosen as his heir apparent.

== Life ==
Denguiadé was born in Sarh in Chad. Her father was from Ubangi-Shari, which would later become the CAR, but her mother was from Chad and that was where she began her education. Her secondary education was in Bangui.

She married when she was fourteen. She was kidnapped by Bokassa to become his third wife. He would later marry fourteen other women.

She was involved in some way in 1977 when her husband's fall from power began. He issued a decree to say that every child attending school in his empire should wear a school uniform. It then appeared that Denguiadé owned the company that made the uniforms. In December 1977 her husband decreed himself Emperor of Central Africa and the Central African Republic became the Central African Empire. He chose to crown Catherine as Empress Consort and she was in an outfit by French fashion house Lanvin. Many of the extravagant items required for the coronation were imported from France. The French President sent eight horses from Normandy to pull their coach. In the event two of the horses died and the couple had to use a car. Her four year old son Jean-Bédel Bokassa Jr. attended the ceremony as the heir apparent. He was named crown prince (prince héritier de Centrafrique). Her son had elder brothers and half-brothers. One of her son's half brothers, Georges, was made a cabinet minister but her husband said he was not strong enough to be an heir.

In 1979 she was in Geneva living in exile with her and the ex-Emperor's seven children. She was said to sell a diamond every time she was short of money.

After Bokassa died she was supported by friends. At the time, both she and her children returned to the Central African Republic. At the end of 2010, Catherine accepted a state medal of honour from François Bozizé who was then the Central African Republic President.

== Honours ==
=== National honours ===
- Dame Grand Cordon of the Imperial Order of Bokassa (4 December 1977).

=== Foreign honours ===
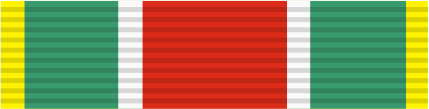
- Order of Korean Labour (North Korea, 1978)
