= Berengo =

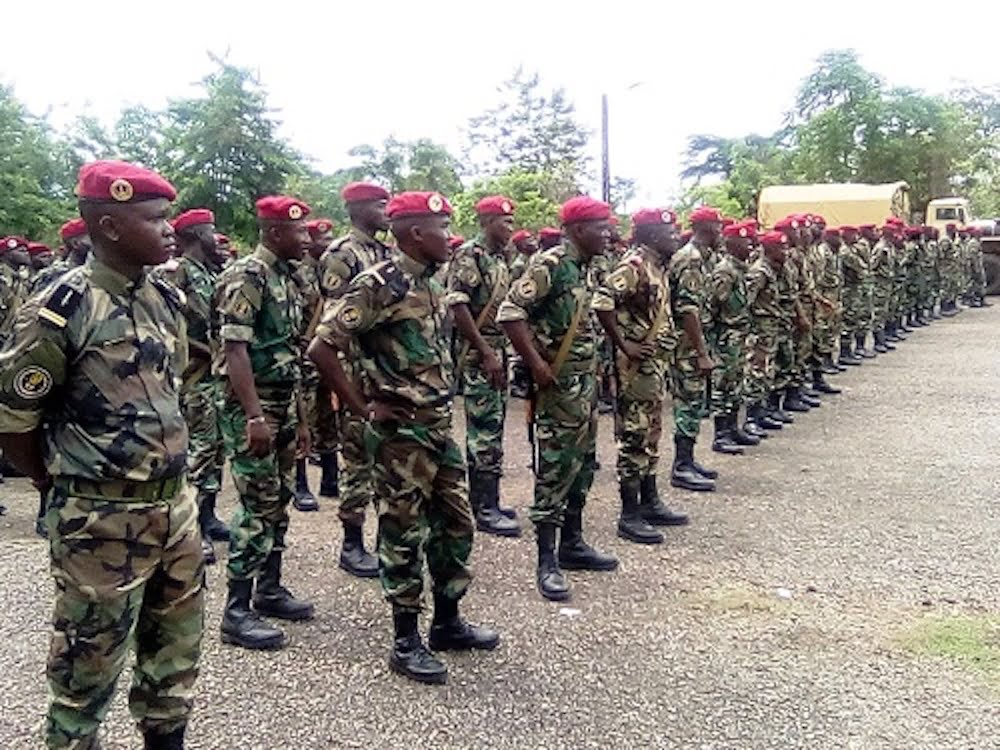
- Central African forces training in Berengo base
- Interactive map of the Berengo area

General information
- Type: Military base
- Location: Lobaye, Central African Republic
- Coordinates: 4.04402°N 18.12262°E
- Completed: 1977

Berengo is a former palace of emperor Bokassa in the Central African Republic province of Lobaye, currently serving as a base where Russian forces from Wagner Group train Central African soldiers.

== History ==
On 4 December 1977 Berengo palace became official residence of emperor Jean-Bédel Bokassa. There he built an airport, separate residences for himself and his wife, Empress Catherine, individual apartments for his advisors, and lodgings for the ministers. On 20 September 1979 French forces seized Berengo during Operation Barracuda. Following his death Bokassa was buried in Berengo.

On 2 April 2013 around 2,000 Séléka militiamen entered Berengo. They created training center there. In December 2013 all officers and instructors were forced to flee due to Anti-balaka offensive. A few hundred Christian Séléka fighters were left besieged there, with wooden weapons and forced to hunt for food. They were eventually brought to Bangui by Anti-balaka general Alfred Yekatom.

On 24 March 2018 presence of Russian instructors were reported in Berengo, according to satellite photos, they first appeared on 22 January 2018. They started training FACA soldiers in the base. First training was completed on 31 March with 200 soldiers and Presidential Guards. This was done despite the Bokassa's family claiming ownership of the palace.
