= Imperial coat of arms of the Central African Empire =

- Armiger: Bokassa I
- Adopted: 4 December 1976
- Crest: A golden sun surpassed by an imperial eagle, topped by the imperial crown, the words "EMPIRE CENTRAFRICAIN", and a ribbon bearing 4 Décembre 1976
- Shield: Quarterly; first: vert, an elephant's head cabossed argent; second: argent, a tree eradicated vert; third: Or, three mullets of four points sable, one and two, each charged with a roundel argent; fourth: azure, a hand couped pointing to dexter chief sable. Upon an inescutcheon gules a roundel argent charged with a map of Africa sable surmounted by a mullet Or.
- Supporters: The flag of the Central African Empire
- Motto: Unité, Dignité, Travail "Unity, Dignity, Work"

The imperial coat of arms of the Central African Empire consists of a shield in the centre, with two flags on its edges, and with a sun rising over the shield, with an imperial eagle in the centre. With the imperial crown of Bokassa I above, below and above the shield are banners, and there is a medal located below the shield as well.

== Symbolism ==
Zo Kwe Zo, the motto on the left, means "A person is a person" in Sango. Zo A Yeke Zo ("A person is also a person") is the motto on the right.

The elephant and the baobab tree represent nature and the backbone of the country. The gold star on a map of Africa symbolizes the position of the Central African Empire. The hand (bottom right corner) was the symbol of the dominant party in 1963 when the original arms were adopted. The bottom left corner holds 3 diamonds, this symbolizes the mineral resources of the country.

The medal under the shield is the honorific decoration of the Order of Central African Merit.

== See also ==
- Coat of arms of the Central African Republic
