= Marie-Josèphe Zani-Fé Touam-Bona =

Politician and first female government minister of the Central African Republic

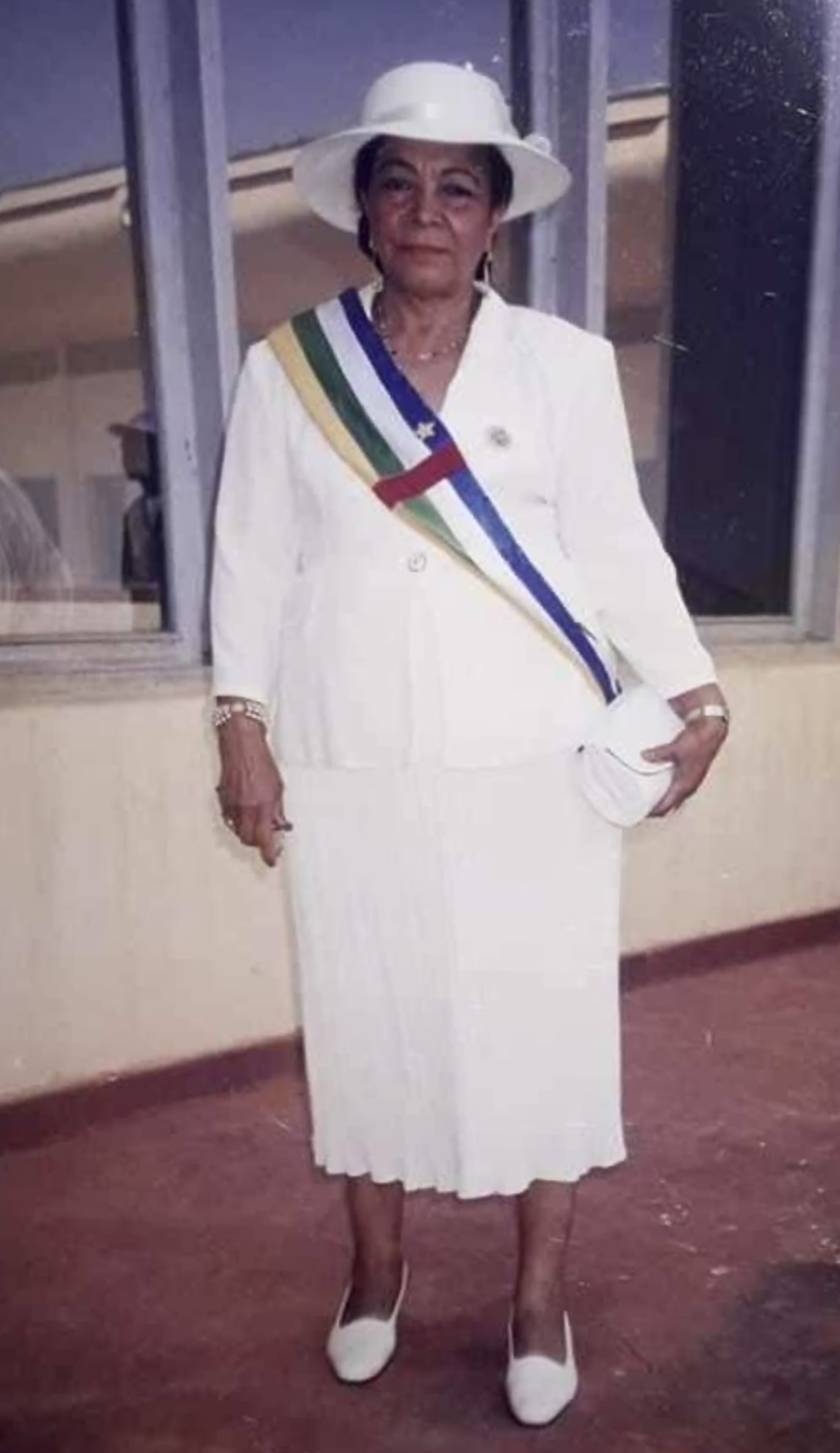

Minister of State for Planning, International Cooperation and Statistics
- In office 1978–1979
- President: Jean-Bédel Bokassa

Minister of Social Affairs, Organization and the promotion of women
- In office 1976–1978
- President: Jean-Bédel Bokassa

Minister of Social Affairs
- In office 1970–1971
- President: Jean-Bédel Bokassa

Personal details
- Born: 12 September 1933 Ippy, Ubangi-Shari (now the present-day Central African Republic)
- Died: 7 December 2001 (aged 68) Paris, France
- Spouse(s): Antonio Franck (m. 1951; div. 1973) André Zani-Fé Touam-Bona

Marie-Josèphe Zani-Fé Touam-Bona (née Valangadede, formerly Franck; 12 September 1933 – 7 December 2001) was a politician in the Central African Republic (CAR). She was the country's first female government minister.

Before entering politics, Marie-Josèphe worked as a schoolteacher and social worker. She was a high-level advisor to the government of David Dacko in the 1960s, and remained in favour after Jean-Bédel Bokassa seized power in 1966. Bokassa appointed her to cabinet in 1970, and she remained in office until he was deposed in 1979, holding a number of different portfolios. Marie-Josèphe re-entered politics in 1993 as an independent member of the National Assembly, and served until her death.

== Early life ==
Marie-Josèphe was born in the town of Ippy (now in Ouaka prefecture), the daughter of Achille Petit-Jean (a Belgian mining engineer) and Augustine Valagandede (a Banda woman originally from Mbrès). Her father left the country before she was born, and only acknowledged her as his daughter several decades later. Because of her mixed-race background, Marie-Josèphe received a French-language education, attending schools in Bangui and Mbaïki run by Catholic nuns. She was given an additional surname during her schooling, Jeannot, in order to identify her as of European ancestry, but took her husband's surname (Franck) after her marriage in 1951.

In 1960, Marie-Josèphe received a scholarship from the national government to attended a home economics training course in Paris, which was worth 30,000 francs. She initially worked as a schoolteacher when she returned to the CAR, but in October 1961 joined the civil service as an assistant social worker. In October 1962, President David Dacko appointed Marie-Josèphe to his Social and Economic Council, where she served until January 1966. In February 1964, he also made her head of the Service for the Advancement of Women, a new government agency dedicated to improving the status of women in Central African society. Marie-Josèphe was further promoted in October 1965, becoming Director of Social Affairs. In March 1967, she was appointed to the inaugural national committee of the Central African Red Cross Society.

== Politics and later life ==
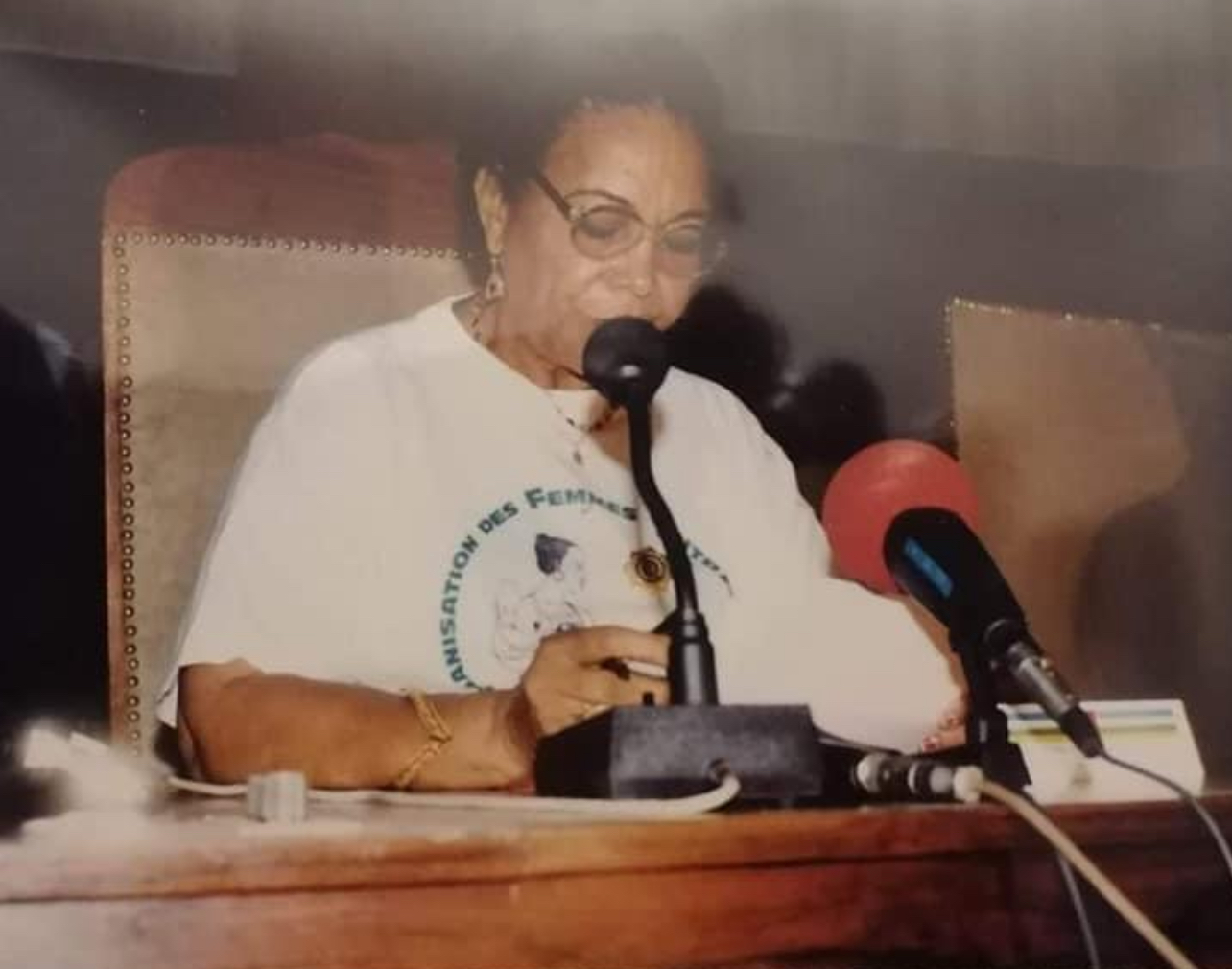
Marie-Josèphe Zane-Fé Touam-Bona

In January 1965, Marie-Josèphe was elected president of the Union Féminine Centrafricaine (UFCA; "Central African Women's Association"), a position which she would hold until her death. The UFCA had been formed the previous year as the women's section of MESAN, the sole legal political party at the time. In February 1970, Marie-Josèphe was made Secretary of State for Social Affairs in the government of President Jean-Bédel Bokassa, who had seized power in January 1966. She was the first female government minister in the CAR, and remained in cabinet for over nine years, only departing in September 1979 when Bokassa was deposed. She held a number of different portfolios and titles during her time in office, at various points being responsible for social affairs, education, and the advancement of women.

Marie-Josèphe returned to politics at the 1993 general election, winning election to the National Assembly as an independent and standing in the Mbrès constituency. She was re-elected at the 1998 election, but died in office in December 2001, while undergoing medical treatment in Paris. Her body was flown back to the CAR, and she lay in state at the National Assembly buildings for two days before being buried in her home village. Her funeral was attended by President Ange-Félix Patassé and various other government officials.

== Personal life ==
In 1951, aged 18, Marie-Josèphe married Antonio Franck, a civil servant originally from Middle Congo. They had seven children together, four sons and three daughters. Antonio Franck also became a minister under President Bokassa, entering cabinet three years before his wife. The couple divorced in 1973, and Marie-Josèphe later remarried to André Zani-Fé Touam-Bona, another of Bokassa's ministers.

== See also ==
- Politics of the Central African Republic
