= 1979 Ngaragba Prison massacre =

1979 massacre of students in the Central African Empire

1979 Ngaragba Prison Massacre
- Location: Ngaragba Prison, Bangui
- Date: 19 April 1979
- Weapon: Clubs
- Victims: Approximately 100 students
- Perpetrators: Jean-Bédel Bokassa and prison guards

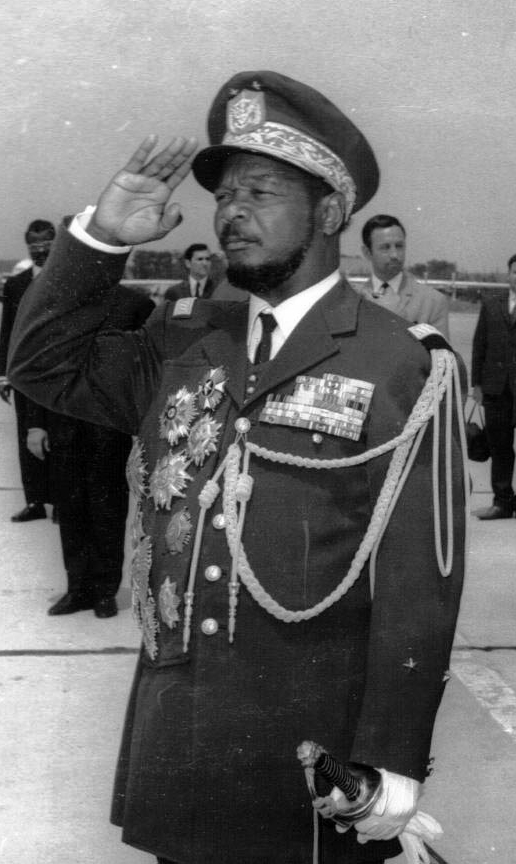
Jean-Bédel Bokassa in 1970

On 19 April 1979, approximately 100 students were massacred in Ngaragba Prison, in Bangui, Central African Republic (officially called the Central African Empire at the time), following student protests against Jean-Bédel Bokassa, who had proclaimed himself the Emperor of Central Africa a few years earlier. This event became known amongst the Central African public as the Bangui Children's Massacre.

== Background ==
Described as one of Africa's most brutal dictators, Bokassa came to power in a military coup in 1966 and ruled the Central African Republic (CAR) as an authoritarian leader. In 1976, the CAR officially became the Central African Empire when Bokassa declared himself the Emperor. Under Bokassa, many political opponents were tortured and killed.

=== New uniforms ===
In January 1979, Bokassa tried to force all students in the country, from elementary school to university students, to wear uniforms made by a company owned by one of his wives. In response to this, students began protesting against Bokassa and by April 1979, the students and police "were practically in state of war". Many students were shot dead by the police during these protests.

=== Mass arrests of students ===
In mid-April 1979, a group of plainclothes police officers attempted to infiltrate a students' meeting. Upon discovering the police officers, the students stripped them naked and pushed them into the street. It has been suggested that this incident triggered the mass arrests of students who were suspected of participating in the protests.

On 19 April 1979, at least 100 students were arrested and taken to Ngaragba Prison. In prison, the students were beaten by the guards and forced into overcrowded cells.

== Massacre ==
At 10 p.m. on 19 April 1979, Bokassa visited the students in their cells and warned that he would "teach them a lesson". He beat several young boys to death using his ivory-encrusted ebony cane. He ordered the prison guards to "carry on". At least 100 students were beaten to death by Bokassa and the prison guards. Several students survived by pretending to be dead.

== Aftermath ==
After the massacre, Bokassa was condemned by foreign governments and international organizations cut off aid. On September 20, 1979, French special forces overthrew Bokassa in a military coup, ending his 13-year rule.
