= Renaissance Palace =

Official residence of the President of the Central African Republic

Palais de la Renaissance
- Interactive map of the Palais de la Renaissance area

General information
- Architectural style: Colonial
- Location: Bangui, Central African Republic

Design and construction
- Designations: Résidence du gouverneur (Original); Résidence officielle du président de la République Centrafricaine (Current)
- Known for: Official residence of the President of the Central African Republic

Website
- la-renaissance.cf

The Renaissance Palace is the official residence of the President of the Central African Republic, located in the 1st arrondissement of Bangui, at the foot of Gbazabangui Hill and facing the PK zéro.

== History ==
The original building with verandas was built in French colonial style from 1917 to 1920 by Victor Henri Sisson.

The palace was the residence of the Governor of Ubangi-Shari until 1960, when the country gained independence from France and the palace became the seat of the President of the Republic.

The palace was reconstructed during the rule of Jean-Bédel Bokassa (1966–1979). During the final three years of Bokassa’s rule, he reigned as the Emperor of the Central African Empire, and the Renaissance Palace served as the imperial palace.
