= Kiki Bokassa =

French autodidact conceptual artist

- Born: Marie-Ange Bokassa; 1975 (age 50–51); Paris, France
- House: Bokassa
- Father: Bokassa I
- Mother: Alda Geday (Lebanese)
- Education: Self-educated
- Style: Expressionist

Kiki Bokassa (born 1975, Paris, France) is an autodidact conceptual artist, who works in the expressionist, figurative art genre. She has paintings in private collections in the Persian Gulf and USA. She was brought up in Lebanon and has exhibited widely in Beirut and overseas.

In April 2009, Bokassa created an immersive art event in Beirut entitled ‘72 hrs’, in which she painted for 72 hours continuously as a peaceful form of expression in self-imposed incarceration. The work took place in a giant canvas cube at Laboratoire d'Art. The event came to the attention of more than 30 international media outlets and was reported on in at least 74 countries.

She is the daughter of the former Emperor of the Central African Republic/Central African Empire, Jean-Bédel Bokassa.
