= Operation Barracuda =

French military operation in the Central African Republic

1979 Central African coup d'état
Date	19–20 September 1979 (Operation Caban); 1979–1981 (Operation Barracuda)
Location	Central African Empire
Result	Coup succeeds.: Bokassa I is exiled.; The Central African Empire is overthrown.; The Central African Republic is restored.

Belligerents
(Central African Empire) House of Bokassa (Central African Empire) Armed Forces loyalists	(Central African Republic) Armed Forces rebels France; Chad; Zaire

Commanders and leaders
Bokassa I	David Dacko; Valéry Giscard d'Estaing

Operation Barracuda was a military operation by France during 1979–1981, to return to power the former President of the Central African Republic, David Dacko. It followed up Operation Caban of 21 September 1979, a bloodless military operation in which Emperor Bokassa I of the Central African Empire was overthrown by French paratrooper troupes.

== History ==
Barracuda was led by French Colonel Bernard Degenne, based in N'Djamena (the capital of Chad), who gave the code name Barracuda to four Aérospatiale SA 330 Puma helicopters and four Transall C-160 transport aircraft, which carried elements of the 8th Marine Infantry Parachute Regiment to the Central African capital of Bangui. At noon, a company of the 3rd Marine Infantry Parachute Regiment from Libreville (the capital of Gabon), was also transported to Bangui.

Until November 1979, Barracuda aimed to protect French citizens in the country and the Dacko government, in addition to supporting the Central African Armed Forces (FACA) in maintaining order. Afterwards, it aimed to rebuild and instruct FACA to ensure the stability of the country. Barracuda ended in June 1981 and was replaced by the "French Elements of Operational Assistance" which remained in the Central African Republic until 1998.

== See also ==
- Françafrique, a term referring to the continuation of French involvement in its former African colonies
