= Jean-Serge Bokassa =

Central African politician

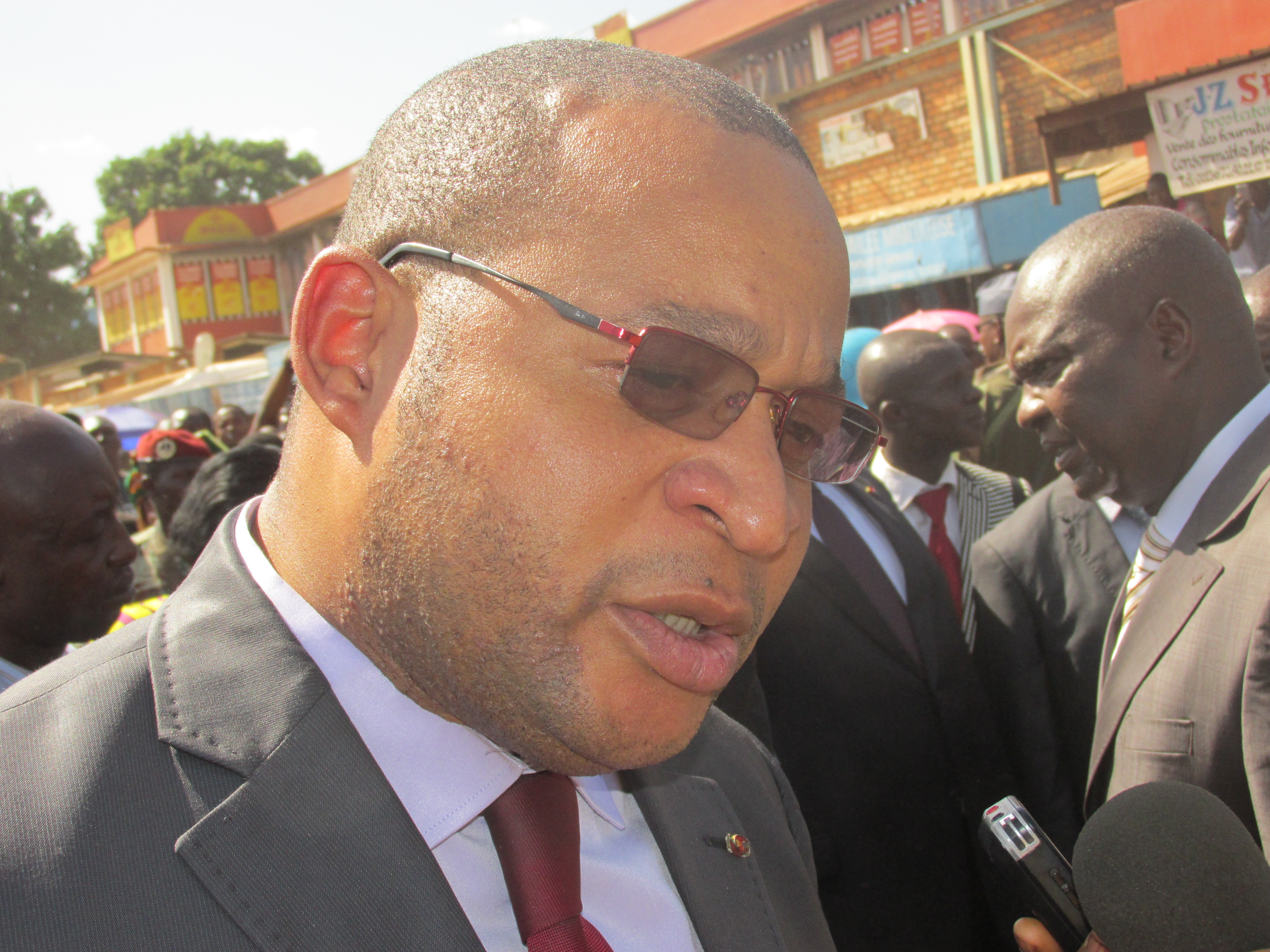
- Jean-Serge Bokassa in 2016

Minister of the Interior
- In office: 2016 – 13 April 2018
- President: Faustin-Archange Touadéra

Minister of Youth, Sports, Arts, and Culture
- In office: 22 April 2011 – 3 February 2013
- President: François Bozizé
- Born: 25 February 1972 (age 54); Bangui
- House: Bokassa
- Father: Bokassa I
- Mother: Joelle Aziza Eboulia
- Occupation: Politician

Jean-Serge Bokassa (French pronunciation: [ʒɑ̃ sɛʁʒ bɔkasa]; born 25 February 1972) is a Central African politician who served in the government of the Central African Republic as Minister of the Interior between 2016 and 2018. Previously he was Minister of Youth, Sports, Arts, and Culture from 2011 to 2013 and was member of the National Assembly from 2005 to 2011. He was a presidential candidate in the 2015 and 2020 elections. He is a son of Bokassa I, who ruled the Central African Empire from 1976 to 1979.

== Life and career ==
Born in Bangui on 25 February 1972, Jean-Serge was a son of Bokassa and Joelle Aziza Eboulia (1955–2001). When his father became Emperor of the Central African Empire on 4 December 1976, Jean-Serge, along with his siblings, became a Prince with the style Imperial Highness. He was a pupil at a Swiss boarding school when his father was overthrown in 1979. As a result, he was taken out of the school and along with other family members went into exile in Gabon. The family eventually returned from exile. While speaking warmly of his father, saying that he was a loving family man and "a patriot" who was the victim of "character assassination by media", he has described Bokassa's creation of a monarchy as "indefensible".

In the 2005 elections Bokassa was elected to the National Assembly for the second Mbaïki district. He served in the Assembly until 2011. Under President François Bozizé, Bokassa was appointed as Minister of Youth, Sports, Arts, and Culture on 22 April 2011. He served in that post until 3 February 2013. In the December 2015 presidential election, he stood unsuccessfully as a presidential candidate obtaining around 6,5% of the votes. Subsequently he backed the candidacy of Faustin-Archange Touadéra for the second round, held in February 2016. Touadéra won the election, and after taking office he appointed Bokassa to the government as Minister of the Interior, Public Security and Territorial Administration on 11 April 2016. In a cabinet reshuffle under Prime Minister Simplice Sarandji in September 2017 he lost the portfolio of Public Security. On 13 April 2018 he was sacked by presidential decree of his portfolio of Territorial Administration and a successor was not directly named. As reasons for his dismissal were given frequent absence from cabinet meetings and official ceremonies. Reports were however that Bokassa and his family were at odds with the government over the use of Berengo, the former presidential complex and mausoleum of his father, by the Russian Wagner Group from early 2018. He ran as a presidential candidate in the 2020 presidential election but withdrew his candidacy on 22 December 2020.

His wife Maryse died in 2020.

== See also ==
- House of Bokassa
