= Diamonds Affair =

1973 political scandal in France

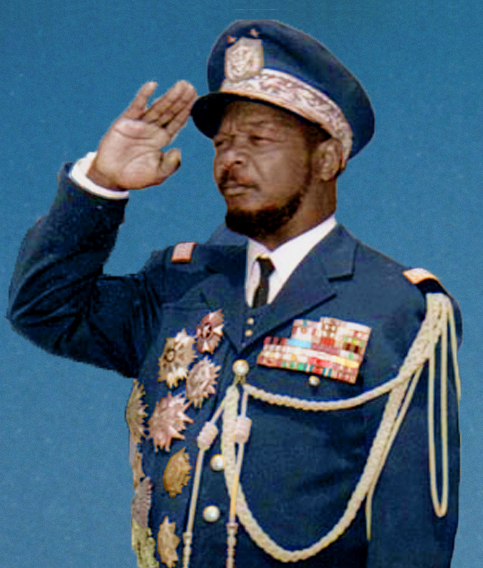
Jean-Bédel Bokassa

The Diamonds affair, known in France as "l'affaire des diamants", was a political scandal in the 5th French Republic. In 1973, the French Minister of Finance, future president Valéry Giscard d'Estaing, was offered two diamonds from the President (and future Emperor) of the Central African Republic, Jean-Bédel Bokassa. The affair was unveiled by the satiric newspaper Le Canard Enchaîné on October 10, 1979, towards the end of Giscard's presidency.

In order to defend himself, Giscard d'Estaing claimed to have sold the diamonds and donated the proceeds to the Central African Red Cross. He expected CAR authorities to confirm the story. However, the head of the local Red Cross society, Jeanne-Marie Ruth-Rolland, publicly denied the French claims. Ruth-Rolland was quickly dismissed from her post by in what she described as a "coup de force" by David Dacko.

The saga contributed to Giscard losing his 1981 bid for reelection.
