= Emperor of Central Africa =

Title of monarch of the Central African Empire

- Empereur de Centrafrique
- Imperial
- Imperial coat of arms

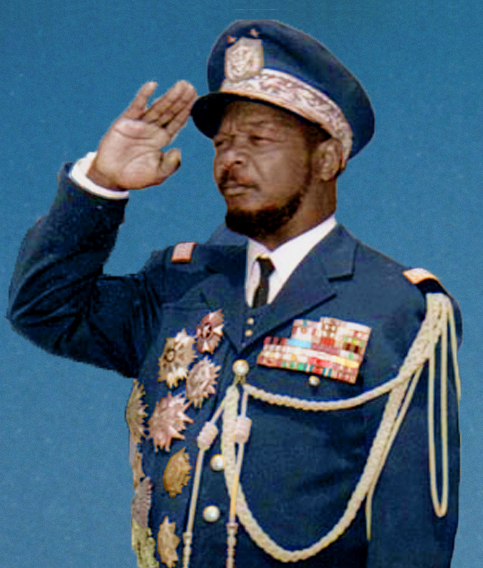
- Last to reign: Bokassa I 4 December 1976 – 21 September 1979

Details
- Style: His Imperial Majesty
- Formed: 4 December 1976
- Abolished: 21 September 1979
- Residences: Renaissance Palace, Bangui

Emperor of Central Africa (French: Empereur de Centrafrique) was the title used by Jean-Bédel Bokassa (as Bokassa I) from 4 December 1976 until his deposal in a French coup in September 1979. Bokassa, who had already ruled the Central African Republic (CAR) as a military dictator since taking power in the 1966 coup d'état, was officially crowned on 4 December 1977 in a lavish ceremony that was estimated to cost the Central African Empire US$20 million (equivalent to $106 million in 2025). Although nominally a constitutional monarch, in practice Bokassa ruled with absolute power. For all intents and purposes, the country was still a military dictatorship, as had been the case with the CAR.

Bokassa I attempted to justify his actions by claiming that creating a monarchy would help Central Africa "stand out" from the rest of the continent, and earn the world's respect. The coronation consumed one third of the nation's annual budget and all of the French aid that year; France also supplied substantial material support to the ceremony from both public and private sources. Despite generous invitations, no foreign leaders attended the event, although delegations were present, such as Robert Galley and René Journiac for France.

His rapprochement to Muammar Gaddafi and his widely publicized repression of internal dissent (culminating in the 1979 Ngaragba Prison massacre) created a rift between Bokassa and the French. The latter decided to depose him through a coup by intelligence service SDECE, codenamed Operation Caban, which took place on 19-20 September 1979. Former president David Dacko was reinstalled and abolished the imperial title.

== List of rulers ==
No.	Portrait	Name (Birth–Death)	Reign start	Reign end	Duration	Prime Minister	Note
Emperor of Central Africa (1976–1979)
1		Bokassa I (1921–1996)	4 December 1976	21 September 1979 (Deposed)	2 years, 291 days	Patassé (1976–1978)	The first and only emperor of Central Africa from 4 December 1976 until 21 September 1979.
1		Bokassa I (1921–1996)	4 December 1976	21 September 1979 (Deposed)	2 years, 291 days	Maïdou (1978–1979)	The first and only emperor of Central Africa from 4 December 1976 until 21 September 1979.
Head of the House of Bokassa (1979–present)
1		Bokassa I (1921–1996)	21 September 1979	3 November 1996 (Died)	17 years, 43 days	Vacant, since the monarchy was abolished in 1979.	After his deposition on 21 September 1979, he became the Head of the House of Bokassa until his death on 3 November 1996.
2		Bokassa II (born 1973)	3 November 1996	Present	30 years, 19 days	Vacant, since the monarchy was abolished in 1979.	After his father died on 3 November 1996, he became the Head of the House of Bokassa.

== House of Bokassa ==
The House of Bokassa is an African former ruling imperial dynasty. The foundation of the House of Bokassa began in March 1972, when Jean-Bédel Bokassa proclaimed himself marshal and president-for-life of the Central African Republic. Public dissent continually grew over the next few years, surviving a coup attempt in December 1974, and narrowly escaped assassination in February 1976. International support was waning during this period as well, so in response Bokassa dissolved the republican government and established the Central African Revolutionary Council in September 1976.

On 4 December 1976, Bokassa instituted a new constitution, naming himself Emperor of the Central African Empire and his son, Jean-Bédel Bokassa Jr., was declared crown prince and heir to the throne. Bokassa maintained a harem of 19 women despite converting to Catholicism. His wife Catherine Denguiadé became the Empress of Central Africa.

Neither the United States nor any European country acknowledged or supported the newly founded monarchy, with the exception of France, whose president, Valéry Giscard d'Estaing, held close ties to Bokassa throughout most of his regime (only breaking these ties shortly before the 1979 coup). Pope Paul VI refused to take part in the coronation ceremony.

Bokassa I had 40 children by his 19 wives. Notable among these are:

- Jean-Serge Bokassa
- Jean-Bédel Bokassa Jr., pretender to the Imperial Throne, formerly heir
- Kiki Bokassa, an artist

Of his grandchildren, those notable include:

- Jean-Barthélémy Dédéavode-Bokassa, an artist and novelist

Bokassa also adopted several children, three of which were Africans. One of these, however, was born in Vietnam as Martine Nguyễn Thị Bái and became Martine Bokassa upon her adoption.

== Gallery ==
Imperial Standard of Bokassa I.

== See also ==
- History of the Central African Republic
- List of heads of state of the Central African Republic
