= Ngaragba Central Prison =

Prison in Bangui, Central African Republic

Coordinates: 4.3667°N 18.5833°E

The Ngaragba Central Prison, the national prison for men, is located in Bangui in Central African Republic (CAR). As of 2022, the Ngaragba prison had around 1,335 inmates; prison conditions are reported to be poor. On November 26, 2014, hundreds of prisoners had taken over the main jail which resulted in some casualties.

== See also ==
- 1979 Ngaragba Prison massacre

== Bibliography ==
- Egyesült, Államok (2007). Country Reports on Human Rights Practices for 2007. Government Printing Office. p. 87. ISBN 9780160813993. GGKEY:5QXCANS2SXR.
