= Central African Empire =

1976–1979 monarchy in Central Africa

Central African Empire Empire centrafricain
- 1976–1979
- Co-official flags (Note: The second flag was the Imperial Standard, but was also used unofficially as a secondary national flag.) Coat of arms
- Motto: "Unité, Dignité, Travail" ("Unity, Dignity, Duty")
- Anthem: "La Renaissance" ("The Renaissance")
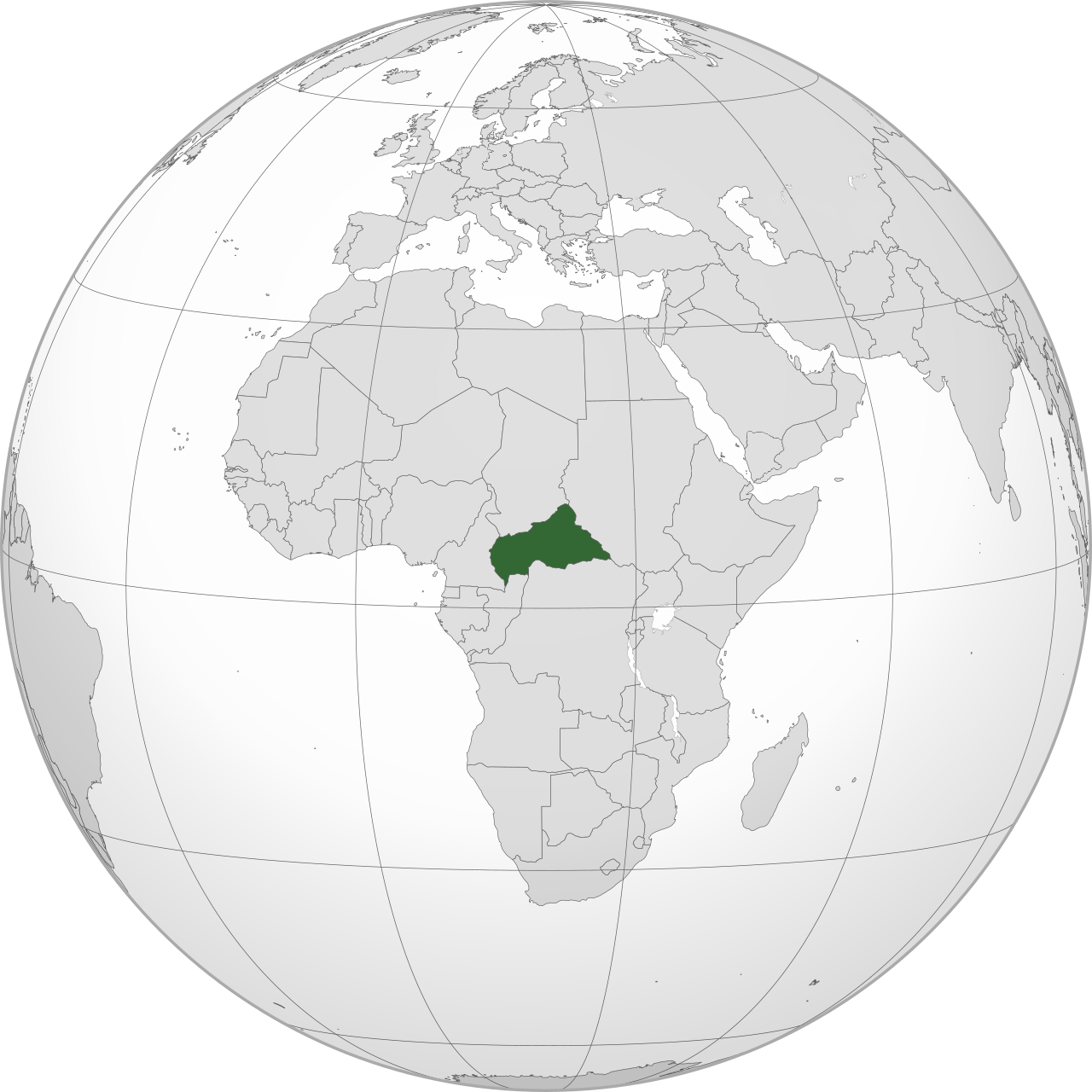
- Location of the Central African Empire.
- Capital and largest city: Bangui
- Official language: French
- National language: Sango
- Religion: Catholicism (official); Protestantism, Sunni Islam (minority)
- Government: Absolute monarchy (de jure); Military dictatorship (de facto)
- Emperor
  - 1976–1979: Bokassa I
- Prime Minister
  - 1976–1978: Ange-Félix Patassé
  - 1978–1979: Henri Maïdou

Establishment
  - Proclamation: 4 December 1976
  - Coronation of Bokassa I: 4 December 1977
  - Overthrow: 21 September 1979

Area
  - Total: 622,984 km^{2} (240,535 sq mi)
- Currency: Central African CFA franc
- ISO 3166 code: CF
Preceded by	Succeeded by
Central African Republic	Central African Republic
- Today part of: Central African Republic

The Central African Empire (French: Empire centrafricain) was an African monarchical state that was established on 4 December 1976 when the then-President of the Central African Republic, Jean-Bédel Bokassa, declared himself Emperor of Central Africa. The empire would fall less than three years later when French and Central African forces overthrew Bokassa and re-established the Central African Republic on 21 September 1979.

== History ==
=== Proclamation ===
In September 1976, President Jean-Bédel Bokassa dissolved the government of the Central African Republic and replaced it with the Central African Revolutionary Council. On 4 December 1976, at the ruling MESAN party congress, Bokassa instituted a new constitution, converted back to Roman Catholicism after briefly converting to Islam earlier in the year, and declared the country to be a monarchy. He then had himself crowned Emperor of Central Africa on 4 December 1977.

Bokassa's full title was "Emperor of Central Africa by the Will of the Central African People, United within the National Political Party, the MESAN" and used the style "His Imperial Majesty". His regalia, lavish coronation ceremony, and regime were largely inspired by Napoleon, who had converted the French First Republic into the First French Empire. The coronation ceremony was estimated to cost his country roughly US$20,000,000 (XAF12,230,000,000,00 in modern values), one-third of the country's budget and all of France's aid for that year.

Bokassa justified his actions by claiming that creating a monarchy would help Central Africa "stand out" from the rest of the continent, and earn the world's respect. Despite invitations, no foreign leaders attended the event. Bokassa was widely ridiculed for this act, with his egotistical extravagance compared with that of Ugandan dictator Idi Amin.

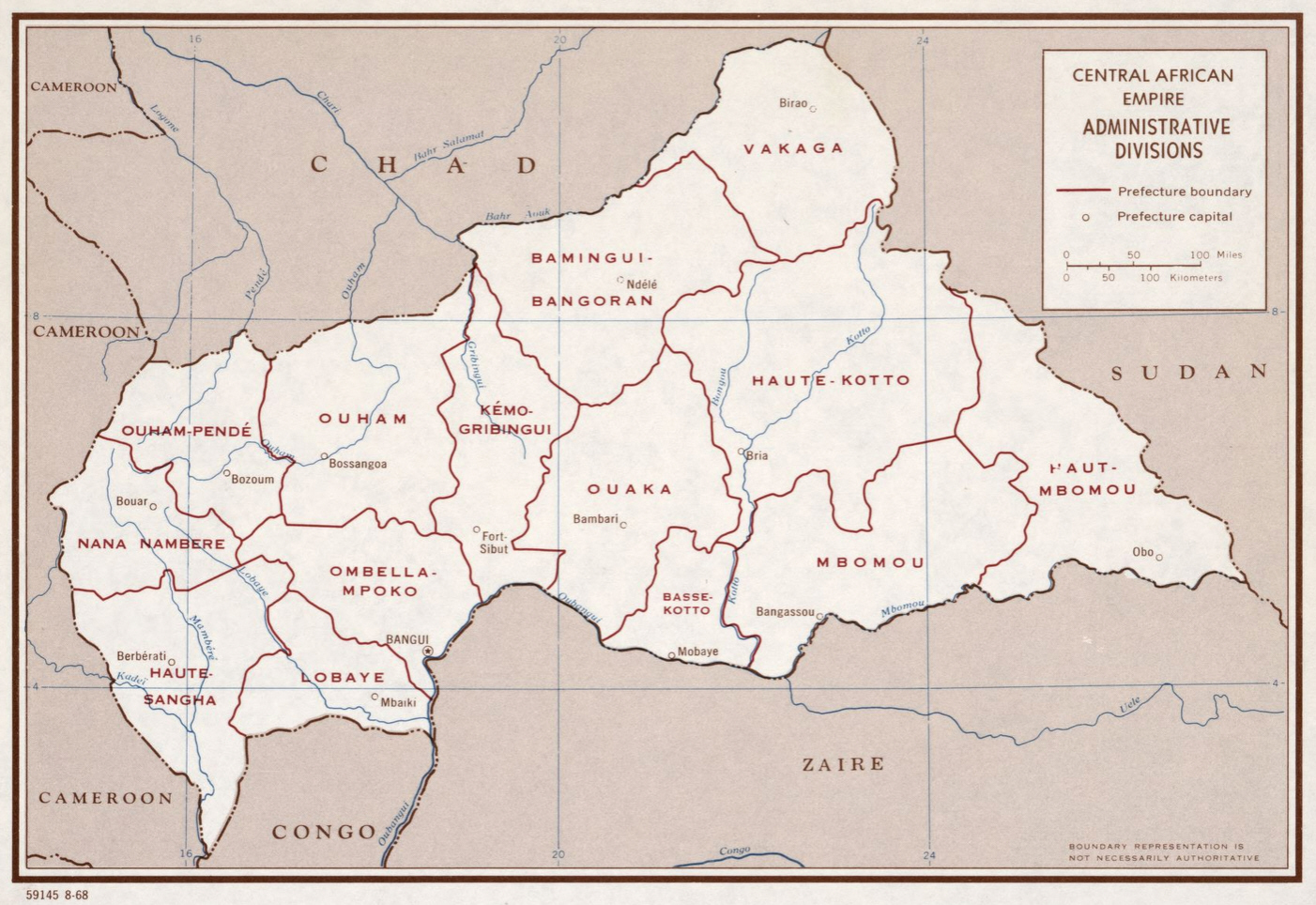
Prefectures of the Empire (1978)

=== Overthrow ===
By January 1979, French support for Bokassa had eroded after riots in Bangui led to a massacre of civilians. Between 17 and 19 April, a number of high school students were arrested after they had protested against wearing the expensive, government-required school uniforms; an estimated 100 were killed in the Ngaragba Prison massacre.

Emperor Bokassa personally participated in the massacre, where he was reported beating dozens of children to death with his own cane. The massive press coverage which followed the deaths of the students opened the way for a successful coup which saw French troops in Operation Caban and subsequently Operation Barracuda restore former president David Dacko to power while Bokassa was away in Libya meeting with Muammar Gaddafi on 20 September 1979.

Bokassa's overthrow by the French government was called "France's last colonial expedition" by veteran French diplomat and regime change architect Jacques Foccart. François Mitterrand refused to have France intervene in this manner again. Operation Barracuda began the night of 20 September and ended early the next morning. An undercover commando squad from the French intelligence agency SDECE, joined by the 1st Marine Infantry Parachute Regiment led by Colonel Brancion-Rouge, landed by Transall transport aircraft, and managed to secure Bangui M'Poko International Airport. Upon arrival of two more aircraft, a message was sent to Colonel Degenne to come in with eight Puma helicopters and Transall aircraft, which took off from N'Djaména military airport in neighbouring Chad.

By 12:30 p.m. on 21 September 1979, the pro-French Dacko proclaimed the fall of the Central African Empire. David Dacko remained president until he was overthrown on 1 September 1981, by General André Kolingba.

Bokassa died on 3 November 1996, in the Central African Republic. In 2009, Jean-Serge Bokassa, who was seven years old when the Emperor was overthrown, stated his father's reign was "indefensible".

== International response ==
=== France's role ===
When Jean-Bédel Bokassa took control of the Central African Republic, the French president, Charles de Gaulle, did not want to engage with the new leader, refusing to receive him and calling him a "bloody idiot." After heavy advising from his chief of staff, Jacques Foccart, De Gaulle finally met Bokassa in 1969, three years after he came into power. When Valery Giscard d'Estaing became president in 1974. Giscard d'Estaing and Bokassa engaged in correspondence and under Giscard d'Estaing, France and the Central African Empire became close allies. When Bokassa declared that he was going to be hosting a coronation for himself as the emperor of the new Central African Empire, many of the novelties that attributed to the luxurious event came from France. This included an imperial crown as well as a golden throne in the shape of an eagle. After various allegations against Bokassa including the beating of school children as well as cannibalism, France intervened with two operations that sought to remove Bokassa from office, the final one being Operation Barracuda.

=== French President Valéry Giscard ===
Valéry Giscard d'Estaing became the President of France in May 1974, where his relationship with Bokassa was more interactive than previous administrations. During his first visit to the country in 1970, Bokassa presented him with diamonds and ivory carvings. Giscard advised Bokassa to avoid a ceremony on the scale of Napoleon due to the Central African Empire's financial situation; however, though Bokassa ignored Giscard d'Estaing's warning, Giscard d'Estaing was the first to congratulate Bokassa on the transition to Empire. Their relationship made news on 10 October 1979 when a newspaper named the Le Canard enchaîné broke a story about Bokassa giving thirty carats of diamonds to Giscard d'Estaing and accused him of giving Giscard d'Estaing a plethora of gifts on his visits to the empire. These included elephant tusks, ivory carved objects as well as precious stones estimated to be worth one million francs. This scandal was later called "Diamondgate" or the Diamonds Affair scandal which contributed to Giscard d'Estaing losing the presidency in the 1981 elections.

=== Operation Barracuda ===
Operation Barracuda was initiated in 1979 after the death of several school children after a protest that was shut down with many students imprisoned in Ngaraba. France severed ties with Bokassa, and began to plan his excommunication when the emperor began working with Muammar Gaddafi, the Libyan leader. Operation Barracuda entailed French soldiers entering the country while Bokassa was on a trip to Libya and instating David Dacko, who had been exiled to Paris, as the new leader. France cut off all humanitarian aid for media presence and then later sent French troops into Bangui, the nation's capital, to install David Dacko as the new leader. Dacko stayed in a hotel in France, where he was exiled, awaiting the call to be transported into the nation as soon as Bokassa made himself unavailable. Leaders from Chad, Congo (then Zaire) all agreed to the idea as well as to aid the French in transport and military support for Operation Barracuda. This operation's success effectively ended the Central African Empire and reintroduced the Central African Republic.

== See also ==
- Saint-Sylvestre coup d'état
- History of the Central African Republic

== Sources ==
- Bokassa, J. (2006). Les diamants de la trahison (in French). Paris: Pharos. ISBN 9782756900742.
- Crabb, J. C. (1978). "The Coronation of Emperor Bokassa". Afr. Today. 25 (3): 25–44. JSTOR 4185788.
- Meredith, M. (1997). The State of Africa. New York: Free Press. ISBN 9780743268424.
- Carayannis, Tatiana, and Lombard, Louisa. Making Sense of the Central African Republic. London: Zed Books, 2015.
- Baxter, Peter. France in Centrafrique : From Bokassa and Operation Barracuda to the Days of EUFOR. Africa@War; v. 2. Solihull, West Midlands : Pinetown, South Africa: Helion; 30° South Publishers, 2011.
- Titley, E. Brian. Dark Age the Political Odyssey of Emperor Bokassa. Canadian Electronic Library. Canadian Publishers Collection. Montreal: McGill-Queen's University Press, 1997.
