= Marie Charlotte Fayanga =

Central African politician

Ambassador of Central African Republic to the Republic of Congo
- In office 2004 – 5 February 2021
- President: François Bozizé; Michel Djotodia; Alexandre-Ferdinand Nguendet; Catherine Samba-Panza; Faustin-Archange Touadéra

Deputy Minister in charge of State Vehicles
- In office 1 January 1975 – 24 September 1975
- President: Jean-Bédel Bokassa

Personal details
- Born: 23 January 1946 Bangui, Ubangi-Shari (now the present-day Central African Republic)
- Died: 5 February 2021 (aged 75) La Rochelle, France
- Party: MLPC; PSD
- Children: 5
- Education: École nationale d’administration Institut International d’administration Publique
- Occupation: Politician; Diplomat; Inspector

Marie Charlotte Fayanga (23 January 1946 – 5 February 2021) was a Central African diplomat and politician.

== Early life and education ==
Fayanga was born on 23 January 1946 in Bangui. She finished her primary and high school education, Lycée Pie XII, in Bangui. She studied at École nationale d’administration (ENA) in Bangui from 1966 to 1969 where she gained administrative certificate. Afterwards, she continued her education at Institut International d’administration Publique in Paris from 1969 to 1972.

== Career ==
Upon finishing her studies in Paris, she returned to the Central African Republic and worked as a central inspector of surface transportation at the Ministry of Transportation and Civil Aviation from 1972 to 1975. Bokassa appointed her as the Deputy Minister in charge of State Vehicles on 1 January 1975. However, she was dismissed on 24 September from the deputy ministerial position after protesting the removal of Louis Alazoula from the government. In February 1976, the government arrested Fayanga for being the relatives of one of the failed coup plotters, François Kossi. Nevertheless, she was released and served as the Secretary of State to the Presidency in charge of the Stabilization and equalization fund for agricultural products at the Council of the Central African Revolution on 4 September 1976.

Upon the downfall of the Bokassa regime, Fayanga became Patasse's follower and joined the MLPC party and became a member of its political bureau. She also served as the Director of Price control in 1982. However, she was arrested together with Lucienne Patassé and Agnes Mbaikoua in March 1982 following the failed coup attempt. She then left MLPC and joined PSD on 4 October 1991. Patasse appointed Fayanga as the transportation inspector in 1994. In the early 1990s, she was known for advocating multipartyism.

Under the Bozize administration, Fayanga became the Ambassador of the Central African Republic to the Republic of Congo in 2004 and was stationed in Brazzaville on 25 March 2005. She held the ambassadorial position until 2021.

== Death ==
Fayanga's health condition deteriorated on 31 January 2021, prompting her to be flown to Paris for intensive medical care. She died on 5 February 2021 in La Rochelle. Her body was flown and buried in Bangui on 25 February 2021. Her funeral was attended by Faustin-Archange Touadéra and Chargé d'Affaires of Equatorial Guinea Embassy in Bangui, Benjamin Obama Eworo Mangue.

== Personal life ==
Fayanga married twice. Her first husband was Mr. Aguide, and she had three children. Later she remarried to Louis Alazoula and the couple had two children.

== Awards ==
- , Commander Order of Merit - 1975.
- , Commander Order of Central African Merit - 1994.
