= Angèle Patassé =

First Lady of the Central African Republic
- In office October 22, 1993 – March 15, 2003
- President: Ange-Félix Patassé
- Preceded by: Mireille Kolingba
- Succeeded by: Monique Bozizé

Personal details
- Born: Angèle Essotina c. 1955; French Togoland
- Died: December 3, 2007 (aged 52); Lomé, Togo
- Spouse(s): Ange-Félix Patassé ?-2007, her death
- Children: Three

Angèle Essotina Patassé (c. 1955 – December 3, 2007) was a Togolese-born public figure who became First Lady of the Central African Republic from 1993 to 2003 as the wife of former President Ange-Félix Patassé.

== Biography ==
Patassé, a member of the Kabye people, was born Angèle Essotina. She was raised in the town of Kouméa, Kozah Prefecture, in the Kara Region of northern Togo.

In 1982, Central African Republic opposition leader Ange-Félix Patassé staged an attempted coup against President André Kolingba (who had recently come to power in the 1981 Central African Republic coup d'état less than a year earlier). Patassé's coup attempt failed, forcing him and his family to flee to Togo, where he lived in exile from 1982 until his return in 1992. During his exile, Patassé divorced his first wife, Lucienne Patassé. He soon married his second wife, Angèle Essotina Patassé, a Togolese woman whom he met while living in the country. The couple had three children during their marriage.

In 1992, Ange-Félix Patassé returned to the Central African Republic from exile. A year later, he was elected president in the 1993 presidential election, an office he held from 1993 until his overthrow in 2003. Angèle Patassé, as his wife, became First Lady of the Central African Republic during his tenure.

In March 2003, First Lady Angèle Patassé accompanied her husband and a Central African government delegation to a regional summit in Niamey, Niger. While returning from Niger, President Ange-Félix Patassé was overthrown by General François Bozizé on March 15, 2003. According to an account by Jeune Afrique, the flight carrying President Patassé back to Bangui was delayed from taking off because First Lady Angèle Patassé was running late from a shopping trip in Niamey. While no one onboard the presidential plane was aware of the ongoing coup at the time, the first lady's lengthy shopping trip "setback probably saved the couple's life," wrote journalist François Soudan in Jeune Afrique. Bozizé and his rebels were seizing Bangui M'Poko International Airport just as Patassé's aircraft was on approach, forcing his plane to divert Yaoundé, Cameroon. While staying at the Yaoundé Hilton Hotel, Angèle and Ange-Félix Patassé learned that their two young children, Salomon and Providence, had been taken to the French embassy in Bangui. The children were soon evacuated by a Transall C-160 military transport aircraft to Libreville, Gabon, with other members of the Patassé family and their Togolese servants. Patassé visits with Cameroonian First Lady Chantal Biya, who also sends the Patassé family African food, though Cameroon President Paul Biya refuses to call former President Patassé. Gabonese First Lady Edith Bongo also spoke with Patassé several times a day in the aftermath of the coup.

Angèle Patassé and her family flew to Lomé in her native Togo on March 19, 2003, where she lived in exile for the rest of her life.

Angèle Patassé died of a long illness, which reportedly included multiple organ failure, at a private clinic in Lomé, Togo, on December 3, 2007, at the age of 52. Her health had declined before her death. She was survived by her husband and their three children.

Angèle Patassé was buried in Lomé, Togo, on December 22, 2007, following a funeral at the Lomé villa were the former president and first lady had lived in exile since 2003. Dignitaries in attendance at her funeral included an official government delegation from the Central African Republic consisting of Minister of National Solidarity and Family Marie Solange Pagonendji-Ndakala, Minister of Urban Planning Timoléon Mbaikoua, vice president Sérédouma of the Central African Republic women's organization, and the Consul General of the Central African Republic in Togo, Mrs. Zoungoula. Former President Ange-Félix Patassé died in 2011.
