= 2001 Central African Republic coup attempt =

2001 Central African Republic coup d'état attempt
Date	27–28 May – mid–June, 2001
Location	Bangui
Result	Coup fails: Military is divided between pro-Patassé and pro-Bozizé factions; Loyalists kill hundreds of ethnic Yakomas in Bangui; 50,000 residents flee Bangui

Belligerents
Government of Central African Republic (History of Libya under Muammar Gaddafi) 100 Libyan troops (Chad) Chadian troops Congolese rebels	Army faction

Commanders and leaders
Ange-Félix Patassé; Abel Abrou †; François N'Djadder Bedaya †	André Kolingba; François Bozizé

Casualties and losses
- At least 59 killed in initial coup attempt. Around 300 Yakoma civilians murdered following coup

On the night of 27–28 May 2001 a coup attempt was carried out by commandos of the Central African Armed Forces who attempted to overthrow incumbent president Ange-Félix Patassé. The coup attempt failed, but violence continued in the capital Bangui over the following days. It exacerbated mounting ethnic and political tensions in the Central African Republic.

== Coup attempt ==
The residence of president Patassé was attacked by soldiers on the night of 27–28 May 2001. The attackers killed 18 loyalist soldiers, including 14 presidential guards whose throats were slit while they slept. They were deterred before dawn; however, fighting went on for multiple days in Bangui, Bimbo and the Kasaï military camp. According to Central African authorities, 59 people were killed during these clashes (25 military and 34 civilians).

On 30 May, General André Kolingba (who had led the country in the past after coming to power in the 1981 coup) claimed responsibility for the attempted coup through Radio France Internationale and demanded that Patassé "resign and hand over power to him". Patassé reacted by demoting Kolingba and four other officers to the rank of private. On June 1, Kolingba called on the other coup plotters to lay down arms and attempted to negotiate with Patassé, which the latter refused. Shortly afterwards, weapons were found in Kolingba's residence. Other officers who played a prominent role in the coup attempt included General Ngjengbot, Colonel Gamba, Major Saulet and Kolingba's son Lieutenant-Colonel Guy-Serge Kolingba. General François Bozizé, who fled to Chad after the coup attempt and who had already been involved in the 1982 coup attempt alongside Patassé himself, was also suspected to be involved. However, the Central African Republic dropped charges against him at the end of 2001.

On 6 July, the Central African chief of staff Abel Abrou, General Francois N'Djadder Bedaya and Commander Yambi were killed. These killings were probably carried out by coup plotters, but may also have been the work of Patassé loyalists who saw them as a threat.

== Aftermath ==
=== Trial ===
After a long trial by the Central African criminal court against 680 defendants, Kolingba (who had fled to Uganda) and 21 of his associates, including 3 of his sons, were handed a death sentence in October 2002. Central African defense minister Jean-Jacques Démafouth was also arrested in connection to the coup. However, Démafouth was among the 49 acquitted in the 2002 trial for lack of evidence.

=== Mounting tensions ===
The coup had the effect of dividing the country's armed forces into two opposing camps which went on to clash violently: one that supported Patassé and another that supported Bozizé. In conjunction with this, existing ethnic tensions were worsened; Bozizé, a member of the Gbaya people, enjoyed support among fellow Gbaya. The Yakoma people, who had long held key administrative, military and financial positions in the country and who had been systematically favored during the presidency of Kolingba (himself a Yakoma), were now targeted by the Patassé government in reprisal attacks. Hundreds of unarmed civilians, most of them Yakoma, were extrajudicially executed and about 80.000 fled to escape the violence. Several of these killings took place in broad daylight on the streets of Bangui.

Over the course of the following two years, foreign fighters from Muammar Gaddafi's Libya as well as Congolese rebels from the MLC (led by Jean-Pierre Bemba) were deployed in combat against Bozizé loyalists. In exchange for Libyan involvement, Libya was promised the monopoly on diamond extraction. The MLC - partially composed of child soldiers - was later found guilty by the International Criminal Court (ICC) of committing war crimes during this intervention, including murder, rape, pillaging and torture. Bemba was arrested in connection to the war crimes in Belgium in 2008, but acquitted in 2018.

Forces loyal to Bozizé marched on Bangui in October 2002 in another failed coup attempt. Bozizé finally overthrew Patassé and took power in the 2003 coup.

== See also ==
- Central African Republic Bush War
- Central African Republic Civil War
- 2002 Central African Republic coup attempt
- 2003 Central African Republic coup d'état
