= Charles-Armel Doubane =

Central African politician and diplomat

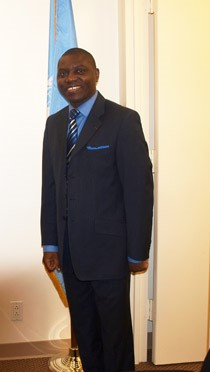

Minister of Foreign Affairs of the Central African Republic
- In office 11 April 2016 – 13 December 2018
- President: Faustin-Archange Touadéra
- Prime Minister: Simplice Sarandji
- Preceded by: Samuel Rangba
- Succeeded by: Sylvie Baïpo-Temon

Permanent Representative of the Central African Republic to the United Nations
- In office 2011–2013
- President: François Bozizé
- Preceded by: Fernand Poukré-Kono

Minister of Education of the Central African Republic
- In office 31 January 2006 – 28 January 2008
- President: François Bozizé
- Prime Minister: Élie Doté
- Preceded by: Timoléon M'baïkoua
- Succeeded by: Bernard Lalah Bonamna

Minister in charge of Relations with Parliament
- In office 18 February 1997 – 15 January 1999
- President: Ange-Félix Patassé
- Prime Minister: Michel Gbezera-Bria
- Preceded by: ?
- Succeeded by: Juliette Nzekou Dongoya

Personal details
- Born: 12 November 1966 (age 59) Zemio, Central African Republic

Charles-Armel Doubane (born 12 November 1966) is a Central African politician and diplomat who served as Minister of Foreign Affairs of the Central African Republic from 2016 to 2018. He previously served as Minister of Education from 2006 to 2008 and as Permanent Representative to the United Nations from 2011 to 2013.

After standing unsuccessfully as a candidate in the 2015 presidential election, he was appointed as Minister of Foreign Affairs by President Faustin-Archange Touadéra on 11 April 2016 and served in this capacity until December 2018.

== Early life and education ==
Doubane was born at Zemio on 12 November 1966. He is a graduate of the French “Ecole Nationale d’Administration” (ENA), of the Hague Academy of International Law, and of the University of Paris XI with a DEA in Public Law, of EUCLID (university) with a doctorate in international law.

== Career ==
Under President Ange-Félix Patassé, Doubane was appointed to the government as Minister for Relations with Parliament on 18 February 1997, serving in that post until 1999. In the November 1998 parliamentary election, he was elected to the National Assembly of the Central African Republic as a candidate of the Alliance for Democracy and Progress (ADP) in Zemio constituency, receiving 67.58% of the vote. Speaking in January 1999, Doubane expressed concern about the presence in his constituency of Congolese soldiers who had fled across the border from Gbadolite to Zemio due to rebel attacks. He complained that the soldiers were abusing the population and urged the government to take action to get them out of the town.

Later, under Patassé's successor, François Bozizé, Doubane was Diplomatic Advisor to the President. He was again appointed to the government as Minister of National Education, Literacy, Higher Education, and Research on 31 January 2006. He served in that post until January 2008.

From 2008 to 2011, Doubane was Director Guarantor of the CAP Chimie SARL. Bozizé then appointed Doubane as Permanent Representative to the United Nations; he presented his credentials to UN Secretary-General Ban Ki-moon on 23 June 2011.

In March 2013, President Bozizé was ousted by Seleka, an alliance of rebel groups, and Michel Djotodia took power. On 31 March 2013, Doubane was appointed to the government as Minister of Foreign Affairs. However, Doubane did not take up his new post, remaining Permanent Representative to the UN. Léonie Banga-Bothy was instead appointed as Minister of Foreign Affairs in June 2013.

Doubane was a candidate in the December 2015 presidential election and supported the candidacy of Faustin-Archange Touadera for the run-off. After Touadéra took office as president, he appointed Doubane as Minister of Foreign Affairs, African Integration, and Central Africans Abroad on 11 April 2016. In 2018, Doubane mentioned having had disagreements with Touadéra during his tenure, which led to internal tensions in the government. He said that these tensions concerned, among other issues, corruption, human rights and the roles of MINUSCA, China and Russia. Talking about these foreign actors, he added: "I have much respect for what they do but cannot close my eyes to violations and do not share the overall vision."

Doubane remained Foreign Minister until December 2018, when he was sacked and replaced by Sylvie Baïpo-Temon. Western observers have claimed that the sacking of Doubane was related to his anti-Russian stance and his opposition to the Wagner Group's activities in the CAR. A more immediate reason for the sacking was that he had followed upon Dieudonné Nzapalainga's call not to partake in a celebration of 60 years of Central African independence organized by Touadéra's United Hearts Movement (Nzapalainga said to have called for this boycott out of respect for the victims of the recent Alindao massacre). According to a source close to the Ministry of Foreign Affairs, Touadéra, displeased over this "affront", already dismissed Doubane on that same day.

== Other activities ==
Doubane is the author of Ma vie, ma vision pour le Centrafrique, published in 2015 prior to the presidential elections. Since 2013, he also served on the faculty for EUCLID, an intergovernmental university which has its historic headquarters in Bangui.

== See also ==
- List of foreign ministers in 2017
- List of current foreign ministers
