= List of foreign ministers in 2006 =

This is a list of foreign ministers in 2006.

== Africa ==
- Algeria - Mohammed Bedjaoui (2005-2007)
- Angola - João Bernardo de Miranda (1999-2008)
- Benin -
  1. Rogatien Biaou (2003-2006)
  2. Frédéric Dohou, (acting) (2006)
  3. Mariam Aladji Boni Diallo (2006-2007)
- Botswana - Mompati Merafhe (1994-2008)
- Burkina Faso - Youssouf Ouédraogo (1999-2007)
- Burundi - Antoinette Batumubwira (2005-2009)
- Cameroon -
  1. Laurent Esso (2004-2006)
  2. Jean-Marie Atangana Mebara (2006-2007)
- Cape Verde - Víctor Borges (2004-2008)
- Central African Republic -
  1. Jean-Paul Ngoupandé (2005-2006)
  2. Côme Zoumara (2006-2008)
- Chad - Ahmad Allam-Mi (2005-2008)
- Comoros -
  1. Aboudou Soefou (2005-2006)
  2. Ahmed Ben Said Jaffar (2006-2010)
- Republic of Congo - Rodolphe Adada (1997-2007)
- Democratic Republic of Congo - Raymond Ramazani Baya (2004-2007)
- Côte d'Ivoire -
  1. Bamba Mamadou (2003-2006)
  2. Youssouf Bakayoko (2006-2010)
- Djibouti - Mahamoud Ali Youssouf (2005–present)
- Egypt - Ahmed Aboul Gheit (2004-2011)
- Equatorial Guinea - Pastor Micha Ondó Bile (2003-2012)
- Eritrea - Mohamed Omer (acting) (2005-2007)
- Ethiopia - Seyoum Mesfin (1991-2010)
- Gabon - Jean Ping (1999-2008)
- The Gambia -
  1. Lamin Kaba Bajo (2005-2006)
  2. Bala Garba Jahumpa (2006-2007)
- Ghana - Nana Akufo-Addo (2003-2007)
- Guinea -
  1. Fatoumata Kaba (2005-2006)
  2. Mamady Condé (2006-2007)
- Guinea-Bissau - António Isaac Monteiro (2005-2007)
- Kenya - Raphael Tuju (2005-2008)
- Lesotho - Monyane Moleleki (2004-2007)
- Liberia -
  1. Thomas Nimely (2003-2006)
  2. George Wallace (2006-2007)
- Libya - Abdel Rahman Shalgham (2000-2009)
- Madagascar - Marcel Ranjeva (2002-2009)
- Malawi -
  1. Davis Katsonga (2005-2006)
  2. Joyce Banda (2006-2009)
- Mali - Moctar Ouane (2004-2011)
- Mauritania - Ahmed Ould Sid'Ahmed (2005-2007)
- Mauritius - Madan Dulloo (2005-2008)
- Morocco - Mohamed Benaissa (1999-2007)
  - Western Sahara - Mohamed Salem Ould Salek (1998–2023)
- Mozambique - Alcinda Abreu (2005-2008)
- Namibia - Marco Hausiku (2004-2010)
- Niger - Aïchatou Mindaoudou (2001-2010)
- Nigeria -
  1. Oluyemi Adeniji (2003-2006)
  2. Ngozi Okonjo-Iweala (2006)
  3. Joy Ogwu (2006-2007)
- Rwanda - Charles Murigande (2002-2008)
- São Tomé and Príncipe -
  1. Ovídio Manuel Barbosa Pequeno (2004-2006)
  2. Óscar Sousa (2006)
  3. Carlos Gustavo dos Anjos (2006-2007)
- Senegal - Cheikh Tidiane Gadio (2000-2009)
- Seychelles - Patrick Pillay (2005-2009)
- Sierra Leone - Momodu Koroma (2002-2007)
- Somalia -
  1. Abdullahi Sheikh Ismail (2004-2006)
  2. Ismail Mahmud Hurre (2006-2007)
  - Somaliland -
    1. Edna Adan Ismail (2003-2006)
    2. Abdillahi Mohamed Duale (2006-2010)
- South Africa - Nkosazana Dlamini-Zuma (1999-2009)
- Sudan - Lam Akol (2005-2007)
- Swaziland -
  1. Mabili Dlamini (2003-2006)
  2. Moses Mathendele Dlamini (2006-2008)
- Tanzania -
  1. Jakaya Kikwete (1995-2006)
  2. Asha-Rose Migiro (2006-2007)
- Togo - Zarifou Ayéva (2005-2007)
- Tunisia - Abdelwahab Abdallah (2005-2010)
- Uganda - Sam Kutesa (2005–2021)
- Zambia -
  1. Ronnie Shikapwasha (2005-2006)
  2. Mundia Sikatana (2006-2007)
- Zimbabwe - Simbarashe Mumbengegwi (2005–2017)

== Asia ==
- Afghanistan -
  1. Abdullah Abdullah (2001-2006)
  2. Rangin Dadfar Spanta (2006-2010)
- Armenia - Vartan Oskanian (1998-2008)
- Azerbaijan - Elmar Mammadyarov (2004–2020)
  - Nagorno-Karabakh - Georgy Petrosyan (2005-2011)
- Bahrain - Sheikh Khalid ibn Ahmad Al Khalifah (2005–2020)
- Bangladesh -
  1. Morshed Khan (2001-2006)
  2. Iajuddin Ahmed (2006-2007)
- Bhutan - Khandu Wangchuk (2003-2007)
- Brunei - Pengiran Muda Mohamed Bolkiah (1984–2015)
- Cambodia - Hor Namhong (1998–2016)
- China - Li Zhaoxing (2003-2007)
- East Timor -
  1. José Ramos-Horta (2000-2006)
  2. José Luís Guterres (2006-2007)
- Georgia - Gela Bezhuashvili (2005-2008)
  - Abkhazia - Sergei Shamba (2004-2010)
  - South Ossetia - Murat Dzhioyev (1998-2012)
- India -
  1. Manmohan Singh (2005-2006)
  2. Pranab Mukherjee (2006-2009)
- Indonesia - Hassan Wirajuda (2001-2009)
- Iran - Manouchehr Mottaki (2005-2010)
- Iraq - Hoshyar Zebari (2003–2014)
  - Kurdistan - Falah Mustafa Bakir (2006–2019)
- Israel -
  1. Silvan Shalom (2003-2006)
  2. Tzipi Livni (2006-2009)
  - Palestinian Authority -
    1. Nasser al-Qudwa (2005-2006)
    2. Mahmoud al-Zahar (2006-2007)
- Japan - Taro Aso (2005-2007)
- Jordan - Abdul Ilah Khatib (2005-2007)
- Kazakhstan - Kassym-Jomart Tokayev (2002-2007)
- North Korea - Paek Nam-sun (1998-2007)
- South Korea -
  1. Ban Ki-moon (2004-2006)
  2. Song Min-soon (2006-2008)
- Kuwait - Sheikh Mohammad Sabah Al-Salem Al-Sabah (2003-2011)
- Kyrgyzstan - Alikbek Jekshenkulov (2005-2007)
- Laos -
  1. Somsavat Lengsavad (1993-2006)
  2. Thongloun Sisoulith (2006–2016)
- Lebanon -
  - Fawzi Salloukh (2005-2009)
  - Tarek Mitri (acting) (2006-2008)
- Malaysia - Syed Hamid Albar (1999-2008)
- Maldives - Ahmed Shaheed (2005-2007)
- Mongolia -
  1. Tsendiin Mönkh-Orgil (2004-2006)
  2. Nyamaa Enkhbold (2006-2007)
- Myanmar - Nyan Win (2004-2011)
- Nepal -
  1. Ramesh Nath Pandey (2005-2006)
  2. Khadga Prasad Oli (2006-2007)
- Oman - Yusuf bin Alawi bin Abdullah (1982–2020)
- Pakistan - Khurshid Mahmud Kasuri (2002-2007)
- Philippines - Alberto Romulo (2004-2011)
- Qatar - Sheikh Hamad bin Jassim bin Jaber Al Thani (1992-2013)
- Saudi Arabia - Prince Saud bin Faisal bin Abdulaziz Al Saud (1975–2015)
- Singapore - George Yeo (2004-2011)
- Sri Lanka - Mangala Samaraweera (2005-2007)
- Syria -
  1. Farouk al-Sharaa (1984-2006)
  2. Walid Muallem (2006–2020)
- Taiwan -
  1. Mark Chen (2004-2006)
  2. James C. F. Huang (2006-2008)
- Tajikistan -
  1. Talbak Nazarov (1994-2006)
  2. Khamrokhon Zaripov (2006-2013)
- Thailand -
  1. Kantathi Suphamongkhon (2005-2006)
  2. Nitya Pibulsonggram (2006-2008)
- Turkmenistan - Raşit Meredow (2001–present)
- United Arab Emirates -
  1. Rashid Abdullah Al Nuaimi (1980-2006)
  2. Sheikh Abdullah bin Zayed Al Nahyan (2006–present)
- Uzbekistan -
  1. Elyor Ganiyev (2005-2006)
  2. Vladimir Norov (2006-2010)
- Vietnam -
  1. Nguyễn Dy Niên (2000-2006)
  2. Phạm Gia Khiêm (2006-2011)
- Yemen - Abu Bakr al-Qirbi (2001-2014)

== Europe ==
- Albania - Besnik Mustafaj (2005-2007)
- Andorra - Juli Minoves Triquell (2001-2007)
- Austria - Ursula Plassnik (2004-2008)
- Belarus - Sergei Martynov (2003-2012)
- Belgium - Karel De Gucht (2004-2009)
  - Brussels-Capital Region - Guy Vanhengel (2000-2009)
  - Flanders - Geert Bourgeois (2004-2008)
  - Wallonia - Marie-Dominique Simonet (2004-2009)
- Bosnia and Herzegovina - Mladen Ivanić (2003-2007)
- Bulgaria - Ivailo Kalfin (2005-2009)
- Croatia - Kolinda Grabar-Kitarović (2005-2008)
- Cyprus -
  1. Georgios Iacovou (2003-2006)
  2. Giorgos Lillikas (2006-2007)
  - Northern Cyprus -
    1. Serdar Denktaş (2004-2006)
    2. Turgay Avcı (2006-2009)
- Czech Republic -
  1. Cyril Svoboda (2002-2006)
  2. Alexandr Vondra (2006-2007)
- Denmark - Per Stig Møller (2001-2010)
  - Greenland - Josef Motzfeldt (2003-2007)
- Estonia - Urmas Paet (2005–2014)
- Finland - Erkki Tuomioja (2000-2007)
- France - Philippe Douste-Blazy (2005-2007)
- Germany - Frank-Walter Steinmeier (2005-2009)
- Greece -
  1. Petros Molyviatis (2004-2006)
  2. Dora Bakoyannis (2006-2009)
- Hungary -
  1. Ferenc Somogyi (2004-2006)
  2. Kinga Göncz (2006-2009)
- Iceland -
  1. Geir Haarde (2005-2006)
  2. Valgerður Sverrisdóttir (2006-2007)
- Ireland - Dermot Ahern (2004-2008)
- Italy -
  1. Gianfranco Fini (2004-2006)
  2. Massimo D'Alema (2006-2008)
- Latvia - Artis Pabriks (2004-2007)
- Liechtenstein - Rita Kieber-Beck (2005-2009)
- Lithuania -
  1. Antanas Valionis (2000-2006)
  2. Petras Vaitiekūnas (2006-2008)
- Luxembourg - Jean Asselborn (2004–present)
- Republic of Macedonia -
  1. Ilinka Mitreva (2002-2006)
  2. Antonio Milošoski (2006-2011)
- Malta - Michael Frendo (2004-2008)
- Moldova - Andrei Stratan (2004-2009)
  - Transnistria - Valeriy Litskai (2000-2008)
- Monaco -
  1. Rainier Imperti (2005-2006)
  2. Henri Fissore (2006-2007)
- Montenegro -
  1. Miodrag Vlahović (2004-2006)
  2. Milan Roćen (2006-2012)
- Netherlands - Ben Bot (2003-2007)
- Norway - Jonas Gahr Støre (2005-2012)
- Poland -
  1. Stefan Meller (2005-2006)
  2. Anna Fotyga (2006-2007)
- Portugal -
  1. Diogo de Freitas do Amaral (2005-2006)
  2. Luís Amado (2006-2011)
- Romania - Mihai-Răzvan Ungureanu (2004-2007)
- Russia - Sergey Lavrov (2004–present)
- San Marino -
  1. Fabio Berardi (2003-2006)
  2. Fiorenzo Stolfi (2006-2008)
- Serbia - Vuk Drašković (2006-2007)
- Serbia and Montenegro - Vuk Drašković (2004-2006)
  - Montenegro - Miodrag Vlahović (2004-2006)
- Slovakia -
  1. Eduard Kukan (1998-2006)
  2. Ján Kubiš (2006-2009)
- Slovenia - Dimitrij Rupel (2004-2008)
- Spain - Miguel Ángel Moratinos (2004-2010)
- Sweden -
  1. Laila Freivalds (2003-2006)
  2. Bosse Ringholm (acting) (2006)
  3. Carin Jämtin (acting) (2006)
  4. Jan Eliasson (2006)
  5. Carl Bildt (2006–2014)
- Switzerland - Micheline Calmy-Rey (2003-2011)
- Turkey - Abdullah Gül (2003-2007)
- Ukraine - Borys Tarasyuk (2005-2007)
- United Kingdom -
  1. Jack Straw (2001-2006)
  2. Margaret Beckett (2006-2007)
- Vatican City -
  1. Archbishop Giovanni Lajolo (2003-2006)
  2. Archbishop Dominique Mamberti (2006–2014)

== North America and the Caribbean ==
- Antigua and Barbuda - Baldwin Spencer (2005–2014)
- The Bahamas - Fred Mitchell (2002-2007)
- Barbados - Dame Billie Miller (1994-2008)
- Belize -
  1. Godfrey Smith (2003-2006)
  2. Eamon Courtenay (2006-2007)
- Canada -
  1. Pierre Pettigrew (2004-2006)
  2. Peter MacKay (2006-2007)
  - Quebec - Monique Gagnon-Tremblay (2003-2008)
- Costa Rica -
  1. Roberto Tovar Faja (2002-2006)
  2. Bruno Stagno Ugarte (2006-2010)
- Cuba - Felipe Pérez Roque (1999-2009)
- Dominica - Charles Savarin (2005-2007)
- Dominican Republic - Carlos Morales Troncoso (2004–2014)
- El Salvador - Francisco Laínez (2004-2008)
- Grenada - Elvin Nimrod (2000-2008)
- Guatemala -
  1. Jorge Briz Abularach (2004-2006)
  2. Gert Rosenthal (2006-2008)
- Haiti -
  1. Hérard Abraham (2005-2006)
  2. Jean Rénald Clérismé (2006-2008)
- Honduras -
  1. Mario Fortín (2005-2006)
  2. Milton Jiménez (2006-2008)
- Jamaica -
  1. Keith Desmond Knight (2001-2006)
  2. Anthony Hylton (2006-2007)
- Mexico -
  1. Luis Ernesto Derbez (2003-2006)
  2. Patricia Espinosa (2006-2012)
- Netherlands Antilles -
  1. Etienne Ys (2004-2006)
  2. Emily de Jongh-Elhage (2006-2010)
- Nicaragua - Norman José Caldera Cardenal (2002-2007)
- Panama - Samuel Lewis Navarro (2004-2009)
- Puerto Rico – Fernando Bonilla (2005–2009)
- Saint Kitts and Nevis - Timothy Harris (2001-2008)
- Saint Lucia -
  1. Petrus Compton (2004-2006)
  2. Rufus Bousquet (2006-2007)
- Saint Vincent and the Grenadines - Sir Louis Straker (2005-2010)
- Trinidad and Tobago -
  1. Knowlson Gift (2001-2006)
  2. Arnold Piggott (2006-2007)
- United States - Condoleezza Rice (2005-2009)

== Oceania ==
- Australia - Alexander Downer (1996-2007)
- Fiji -
  1. Kaliopate Tavola (2000-2006)
  2. Isikeli Mataitoga (acting) (2006-2007)
- French Polynesia -
  1. Oscar Temaru (2005-2006)
  2. Gaston Tong Sang (2006-2007)
- Kiribati - Anote Tong (2003–2016)
- Marshall Islands - Gerald Zackios (2001-2008)
- Micronesia - Sebastian Anefal (2003-2007)
- Nauru - David Adeang (2004-2007)
- New Zealand - Winston Peters (2005-2008)
  - Cook Islands - Wilkie Rasmussen (2005-2009)
  - Niue - Young Vivian (2002-2008)
- Palau - Temmy Shmull (2001-2009)
- Papua New Guinea -
  1. Sir Rabbie Namaliu (2002-2006)
  2. Sir Michael Somare (2006)
  3. Paul Tiensten (2006-2007)
- Samoa - Tuilaepa Aiono Sailele Malielegaoi (1998–2021)
- Solomon Islands -
  1. Laurie Chan (2002-2006)
  2. Patteson Oti (2006-2007)
- Tonga - Sonatane Tu'a Taumoepeau Tupou (2004-2009)
- Tuvalu -
  1. Maatia Toafa (2004-2006)
  2. Apisai Ielemia (2006-2010)
- Vanuatu - Sato Kilman (2004-2007)

== South America ==
- Argentina - Jorge Taiana (2005-2010)
- Bolivia -
  1. Armando Loaiza (2005-2006)
  2. David Choquehuanca (2006–2017)
- Brazil - Celso Amorim (2003-2011)
- Chile -
  1. Ignacio Walker Prieto (2004-2006)
  2. Alejandro Foxley (2006-2009)
- Colombia -
  1. Carolina Barco (2002-2006)
  2. María Consuelo Araújo (2006-2007)
- Ecuador - Francisco Carrión (2005-2007)
- Guyana - Rudy Insanally (2001-2008)
- Paraguay -
  1. Leila Rachid de Cowles (2003-2006)
  2. Rubén Ramírez Lezcano (2006-2008)
- Peru -
  1. Óscar Maúrtua de Romaña (2005-2006)
  2. José Antonio García Belaúnde (2006-2011)
- Suriname - Lygia Kraag-Keteldijk (2005-2010)
- Uruguay - Reinaldo Gargano (2005-2008)
- Venezuela -
  1. Alí Rodríguez Araque (2004-2006)
  2. Nicolás Maduro (2006-2013)
