= Martial Beti Marace =

Central African diplomat (born 1959)

Minister of Foreign Affairs
- In office 16 January 2003 – 31 March 2003
- President: Ange-Félix Patassé
- Prime Minister: Martin Ziguélé
- Preceded by: Agba Otikpo Mézodé
- Succeeded by: Karim Meckassoua

Minister of Justice
- In office 17 April 1995 – 17 June 1996
- President: Ange-Félix Patassé
- Prime Minister: Gabriel Koyambounou
- Preceded by: ?
- Succeeded by: ?

Personal details
- Born: 1959 (age 66–67)

Martial Beti Marace is a politician and diplomat from the Central African Republic. Marace was named foreign minister of the country in 2003 under President Ange-Félix Patassé.

On March 13, 2003, Foreign Minister Marace accompanied President Patassé to a regional Community of Sahel–Saharan States in Niamey, Niger. While in Niger, President Patassé was overthrown by rebels led by François Bozizé on March 15, 2003. The coup ended Marace's brief tenure as foreign minister.

Preceded by Agba Otikpo Mézodé	Foreign Minister of the Central African Republic; 2003	Succeeded by Karim Meckassoua
