= Léa Koyassoum Doumta =

Central African politician

Minister of Commerce and Industry
- In office 24 June 2021 – 5 January 2024
- President: Faustin-Archange Touadéra
- Prime Minister: Henri-Marie Dondra; Félix Moloua
- Preceded by: Mahamat Taib Yacoub
- Succeeded by: Thierry Patrick Akoloza

Minister of Public Health
- In office 19 June 2005 – 31 January 2006
- President: François Bozizé
- Prime Minister: Élie Doté
- Preceded by: Nestor Mamadou-Nali
- Succeeded by: Bernard Lala Konamna

Minister of Justice
- In office 2 September 2004 – 10 January 2005
- President: François Bozizé
- Prime Minister: Célestin Gaombalet
- Preceded by: Yacinthe Wodobodé
- Succeeded by: Paul Otto

Minister of Family, Social Affairs and National Solidarity
- In office 31 March 2003 – 2 September 2004
- President: François Bozizé
- Prime Minister: Abel Goumba; Célestin Gaombalet
- Preceded by: Françoise Ibrahim
- Succeeded by: Marie Solange Pagonendji-Ndakala

Personal details
- Born: 25 November 1956 (age 69) Bouca, Ubangi-Shari (now the present-day Central African Republic)
- Party: PUN
- Education: University of Bangui

Léa Mboua Koyassoum Doumta (born 25 November 1956) is a Central African politician and teacher.

== Early life and education ==
Doumta was born on 25 November 1956 in Bouca. She studied primary education in Batangafo and attended high school in Lycée Marie Jeanne Caron in Bangui. Afterwards, she enrolled at the teacher college of École normale d’instituteurs. She then learned English at École normale supérieure and continued her higher education at the University of Bangui.

== Education career ==
Upon finishing studies at École normale d’instituteurs, Doumta started her teaching career at École d’application centre mixte in Bangui. In 1996, Doumta taught at Lycée Marie Jeanne Caron. One year later, she moved to Berberati and served as a high school teacher at Lycée Barthélemy Boganda until 1999. After that, she returned to Bangui and was employed as the coordinator for the English Language Program at Martin Luther King Cultural Center of the United States embassy in Bangui from 1999 to 2003.

== Political career ==
Doumta commenced her political career by joining Femmes travailleuses de Centrafrique trade union board and became the president from 1992 to 1997. She then joined PUN and served as the party's secretary-general in 1999.

On 31 March 2003, Goumba appointed Doumta as the minister of family, social Affairs, and national solidarity. As the minister of social affairs, she dissolved the CAR Red Cross Society executive bodies and assigned an interim body over the chairman's mismanagement. Later, police arrested the chairman of the Red Cross Society, Francois Farra-Frond, on 12 August 2003 over the allegation of corruption in red cross donor funds. She held that position until 2 September 2004. Under the Gaombalet cabinet, Doumta served as the minister of justice on 2 September 2004. However, she was designated as the PUN campaign manager for the 2005 Central African general election in late 2004. On 10 January 2005, Bozize dismissed Doumta as a minister of justice.

Doté assigned Doumta as the minister of public health on public health on 19 June 2005 and served it until 31 January 2006. Subsequently, she served as the advisor of Doté from 2006 to 2007, then worked at the World Health Organization from 2007 to 2008.

Doumta was designated as the president of PUN's Transitional Guidance Council in October 2010. During the 2011 Central African general election, she and her party endorsed Bozizé's presidential candidacy.

In April 2013, Doumta was elected vice president of the National Transitional Council (CNT). She then served as acting president of CNT in January 2014. She was one of the signatories of the Catholic Church Community of Sant’Egidio's agreement for national reconciliation in the CAR on 27 February 2015 in Rome.

Anti-balaka militias kidnapped Doumta after returning from a funeral on 18 October 2015. Subsequently, Doumta tried to negotiate her release with the abductor for more than two hours. Later, Anti-balaka released Doumta with a list of demands to the government. In 2020, Doumta became the coordinator of the pro-Touadera campaign group, Bè Oko.

On 24 June 2021, Dondra appointed Doumta as the minister of commerce and industry. Although she was a minister, she opposed the constitution reform proposal during the 2023 Central African constitutional referendum campaign due to the flaws and lack of consultation. Due to her dissent views on the constitution reform, pro-Touadera supporters called for her resignation from the ministerial position. In September 2023, she was reelected as the national coordinator of Awlyn Centrafrique. She stepped down as the minister of commerce and industry on 5 January 2024 and was replaced by Thierry Patrick Akoloza.

== Bibliography ==
- Bradshaw, Richard; Rius, Juan Fandos (2016). Historical Dictionary of the Central African Republic (Historical Dictionaries of Africa). Lanham: Rowman & Littlefield.
