= Soldier =

Member of an Army

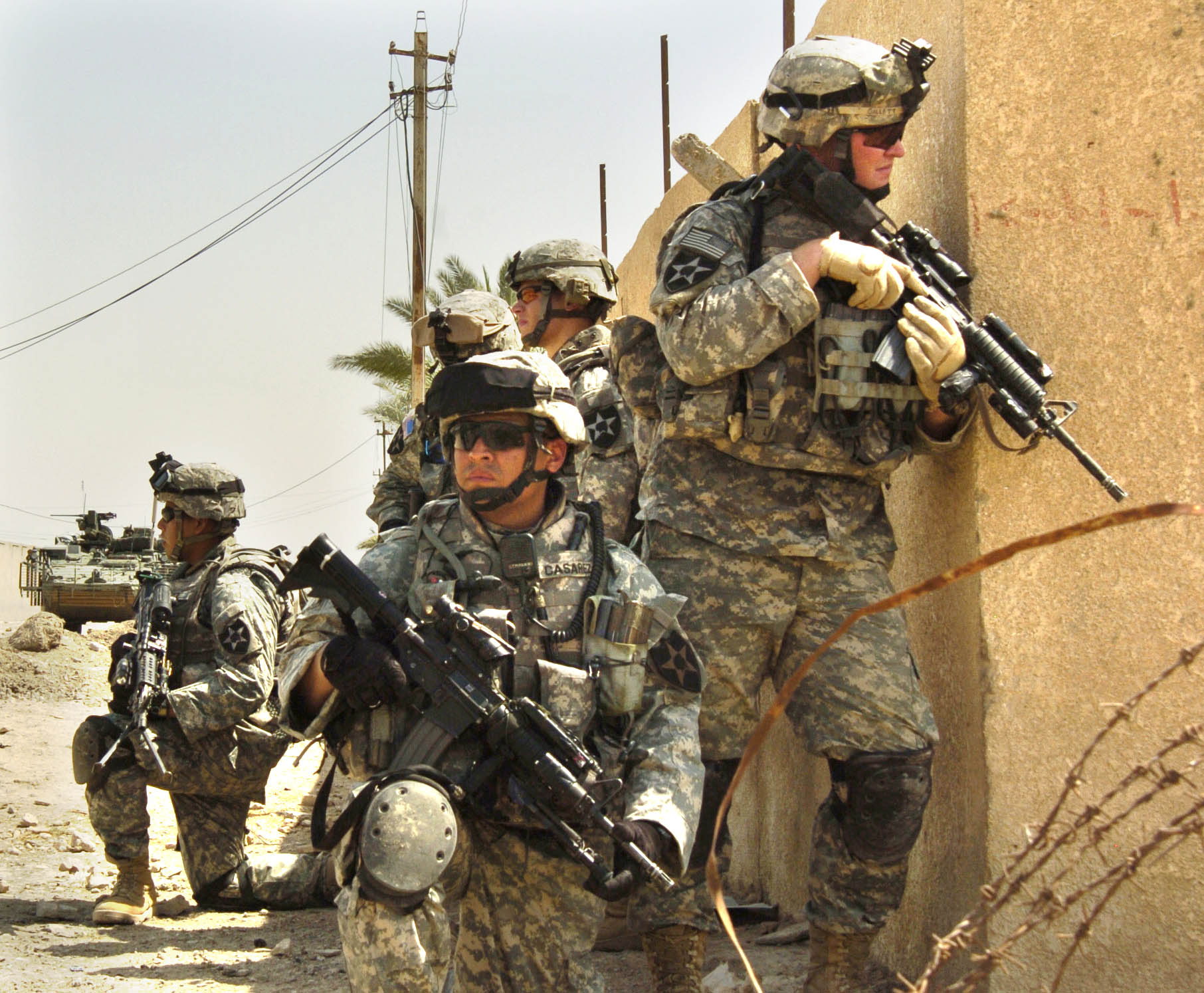
- United States Army soldiers in Baghdad, Iraq in 2006

Occupation
- Occupation type: Profession
- Activity sectors: Military

Description
- Fields of employment: Army

A soldier is a person who is a member of an army. A soldier can be a conscripted or volunteer enlisted person, a non-commissioned officer, a warrant officer, or an officer.

== Etymology ==
The word soldier derives from the Middle English word soudeour, from Old French soudeer or soudeour, meaning mercenary, from soudee, meaning shilling's worth or wage, from sou or soud, shilling. The word is also related to the Medieval Latin soldarius, meaning soldier (lit. 'one having pay'). These words ultimately derive from the Late Latin word solidus, referring to an ancient Roman coin used in the Byzantine Empire.

== Occupational and other designations ==
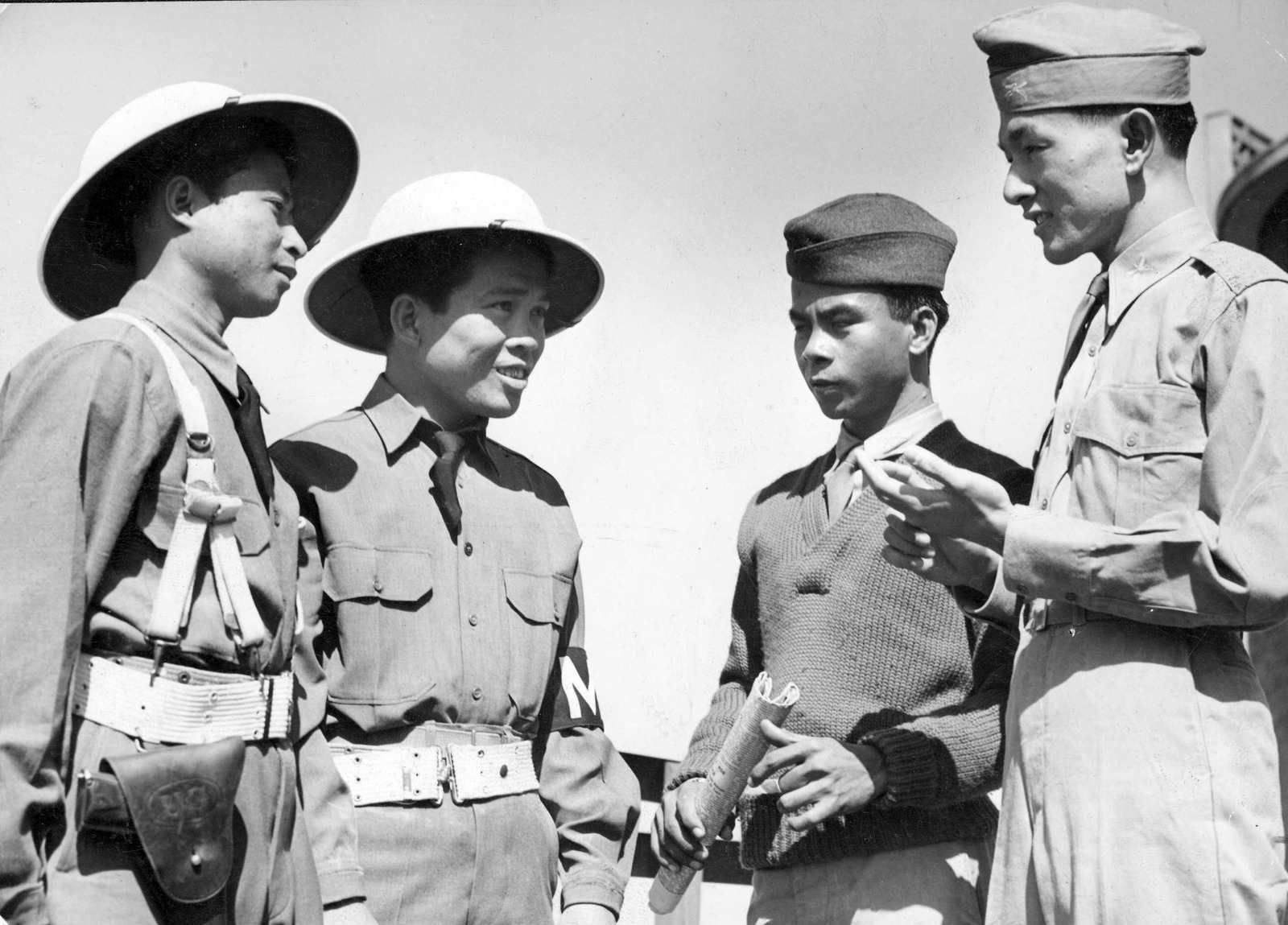
Australian Army soldiers in Victoria, 1941

In most armies, the word "soldier" has a general meaning that refers to all members of an army, distinct from more specialized military occupations that require different areas of knowledge and skill sets. "Soldiers" may be referred to by titles, names, nicknames, or acronyms that reflect an individual's military occupation specialty arm, service, or branch of military employment, their type of unit, or operational employment or technical use such as: trooper, tanker (a member of tank crew), commando, dragoon, infantryman, guardsman, artilleryman, paratrooper, grenadier, ranger, sniper, engineer, sapper, craftsman, signaller, medic, rifleman, or gunner, among other terms.

Some of these designations, or their etymological origins, have existed in English for centuries. In contrast, others are relatively recent, reflecting changes in technology, an increased division of labor, or other factors. In the United States Army, a soldier's military job is designated as a Military Occupational Specialty (MOS), which includes a very wide array of MOS Branches and sub-specialties. One example of a nickname for a soldier in a specific occupation is the term "red caps" to refer to military policemen personnel in the British Army because of the colour of their headgear.

Infantry are sometimes called "grunts" in the United States Army (as well as in the U.S. Marine Corps) or "squaddies" (in the British Army). U.S. Army artillery crews, or "gunners," are sometimes referred to as "redlegs", from the service branch color for artillery. U.S. soldiers are often called "G.I.s" (short for the term "Government Issue"). Such terms may be associated with particular wars or historical eras. "G.I." came into common use during and after World War II, but before and during World War I, especially, American soldiers were called "Doughboys." In contrast, British infantry troops were often referred to as "Tommies" (short for the archetypal soldier "Tommy Atkins") and French infantry were called "Poilus" ("hairy ones").

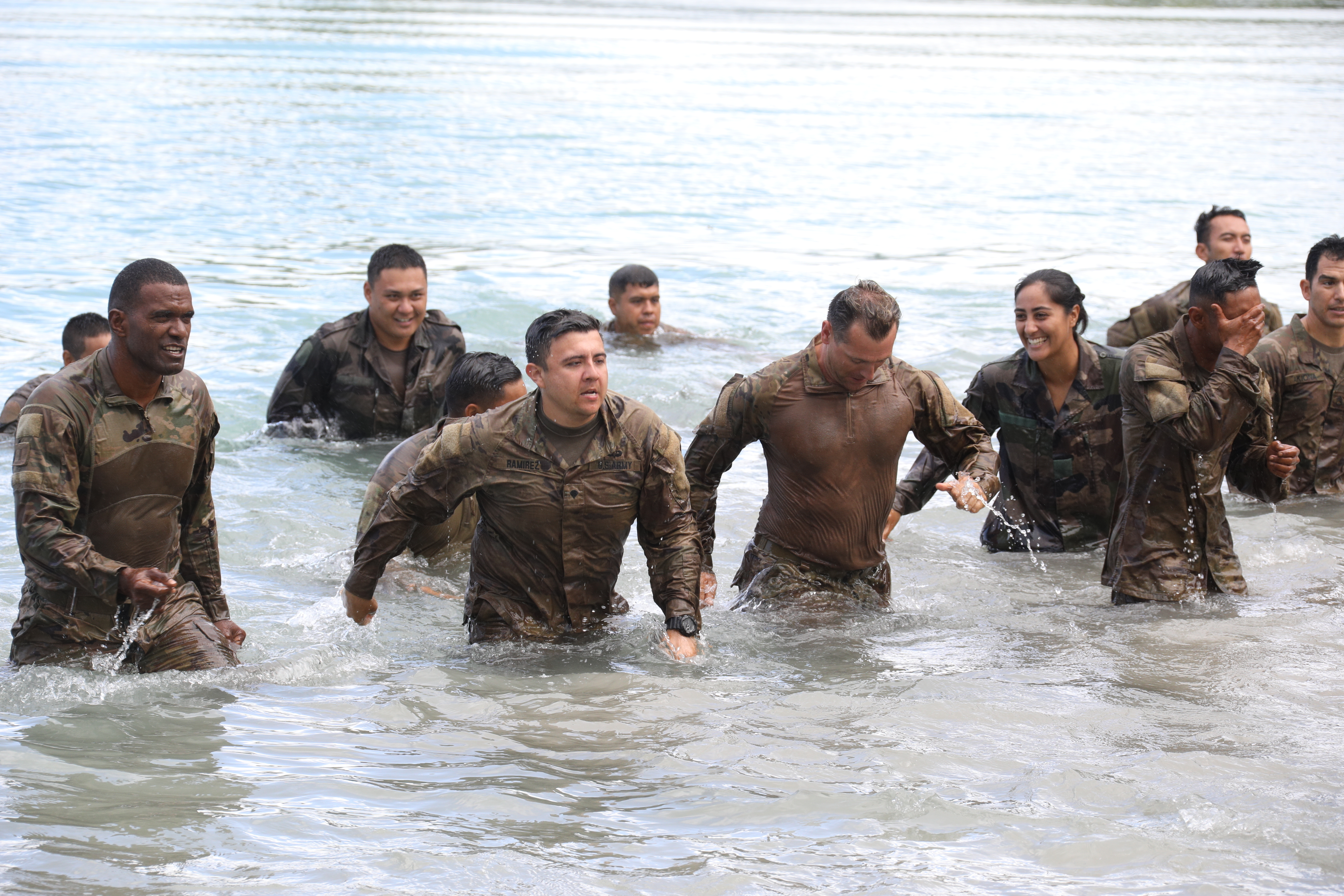
American and French soldiers during a water obstacle training exercise, 2022

Some formal or informal designations may reflect the status or changes in status of soldiers for reasons of gender, race, or other social factors. With certain exceptions, service as a soldier, especially in the infantry, had generally been restricted to males throughout world history. By World War II, women were actively deployed in Allied forces in different ways. Some notable female soldiers in the Soviet Union were honored as "Heroes of the Soviet Union" for their actions in the army or as partisan fighters. In the United Kingdom, women served in the Auxiliary Territorial Service (ATS) and later in the Women's Royal Army Corps (WRAC). Soon after it entered the war, the U.S. formed the Women's Army Corps, whose female soldiers were often referred to as "WACs." These sex-segregated branches were disbanded in the last decades of the twentieth century, and women soldiers were integrated into the standing branches of the military. However, their ability to serve in armed combat was often restricted.

Race has historically been an issue that has restricted the ability of some people to serve in the U.S. Army. Until the American Civil War, Black soldiers fought in integrated and sometimes separate units, but at other times were not allowed to serve, largely due to fears about the possible effects of such service on the institution of legal slavery. Some Black soldiers, both freemen and men who had escaped from slavery, served in the Union Army until 1863, when the Emancipation Proclamation opened the door for the formation of Black units. After the war, Black soldiers continued to serve, but in segregated units, often subjected to physical and verbal racist abuse. The term "Buffalo Soldiers" was applied to some units that fought in the 19th-century American Indian Wars in the American West. Eventually, the phrase was applied more generally to segregated Black units, who often distinguished themselves in armed conflict and other services. In 1948, President Harry S. Truman issued an executive order for the end of segregation in the United States Armed Forces.

== Service ==
=== Conscription ===
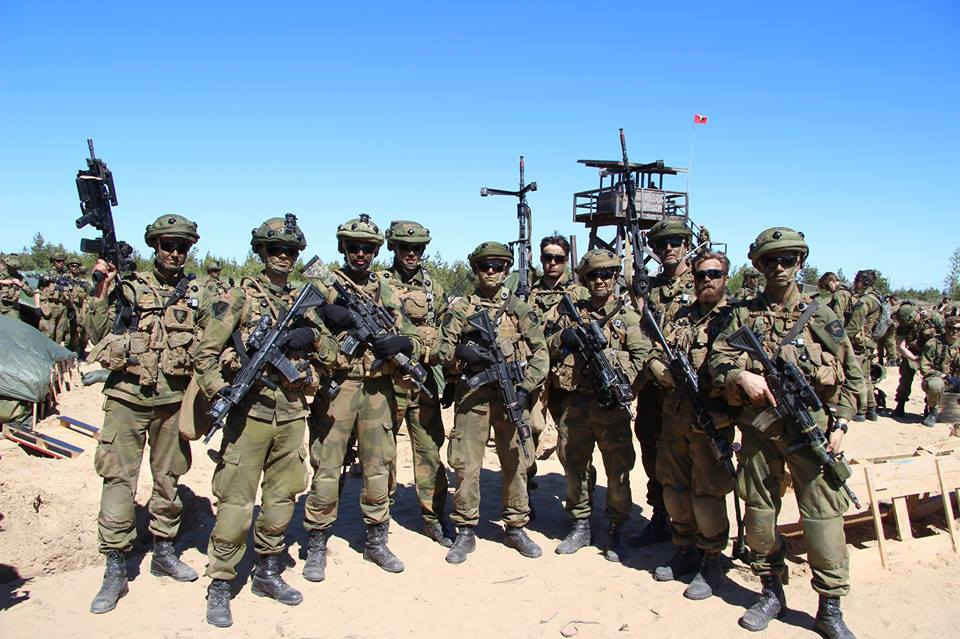
Norwegian Army soldiers, conscripts, and officers during a NATO exercise in Latvia, 2015

Throughout history, individuals have often been compelled by force or law to serve in armies and other armed forces in times of war or other times. Modern forms of such compulsion are generally referred to as "conscription" or a "draft". Currently, many countries require registration for some form of mandatory service, although that requirement may be selectively enforced or exist only in law and not in practice. In times of war, requirements, such as age, may be broadened when additional troops are deemed necessary.

At different times and places, some individuals have been able to avoid conscription by having another person take their place. Modern draft laws may provide temporary or permanent exemptions from service or allow some other non-combatant service, as in the case of conscientious objectors.

In the United States, males aged 18-25 are required to register with the Selective Service System, which has responsibility for overseeing the draft. However, no draft has been held since 1973, and the U.S. military has maintained staffing through voluntary enlistment.

=== Enlistment ===
Soldiers in war may have various motivations for voluntarily enlisting and remaining in an army or another branch of the armed forces. In a study of 18th-century soldiers' written records about their time in service, historian Ilya Berkovich suggests "three primary 'levers' of motivation ... 'coercive', 'remunerative', and 'normative' incentives." Berkovich argues that historians' assumptions that fear of coercive force kept unwilling conscripts in check and controlled rates of desertion have been overstated and that any pay or other remuneration for service as provided then would have been an insufficient incentive. Instead, "old-regime common soldiers should be viewed primarily as willing participants who saw themselves as engaged in a distinct and honourable activity."

In modern times, soldiers have volunteered for armed service, especially in time of war, out of a sense of patriotic duty to their homeland or to advance a social, political, or ideological cause, while improved levels of remuneration or training might be more of an incentive in times of economic hardship. Soldiers might also enlist for personal reasons, such as following family or social expectations, or for the order and discipline provided by military training, as well as for the friendship and connection with their fellow soldiers afforded by close contact in a common enterprise.

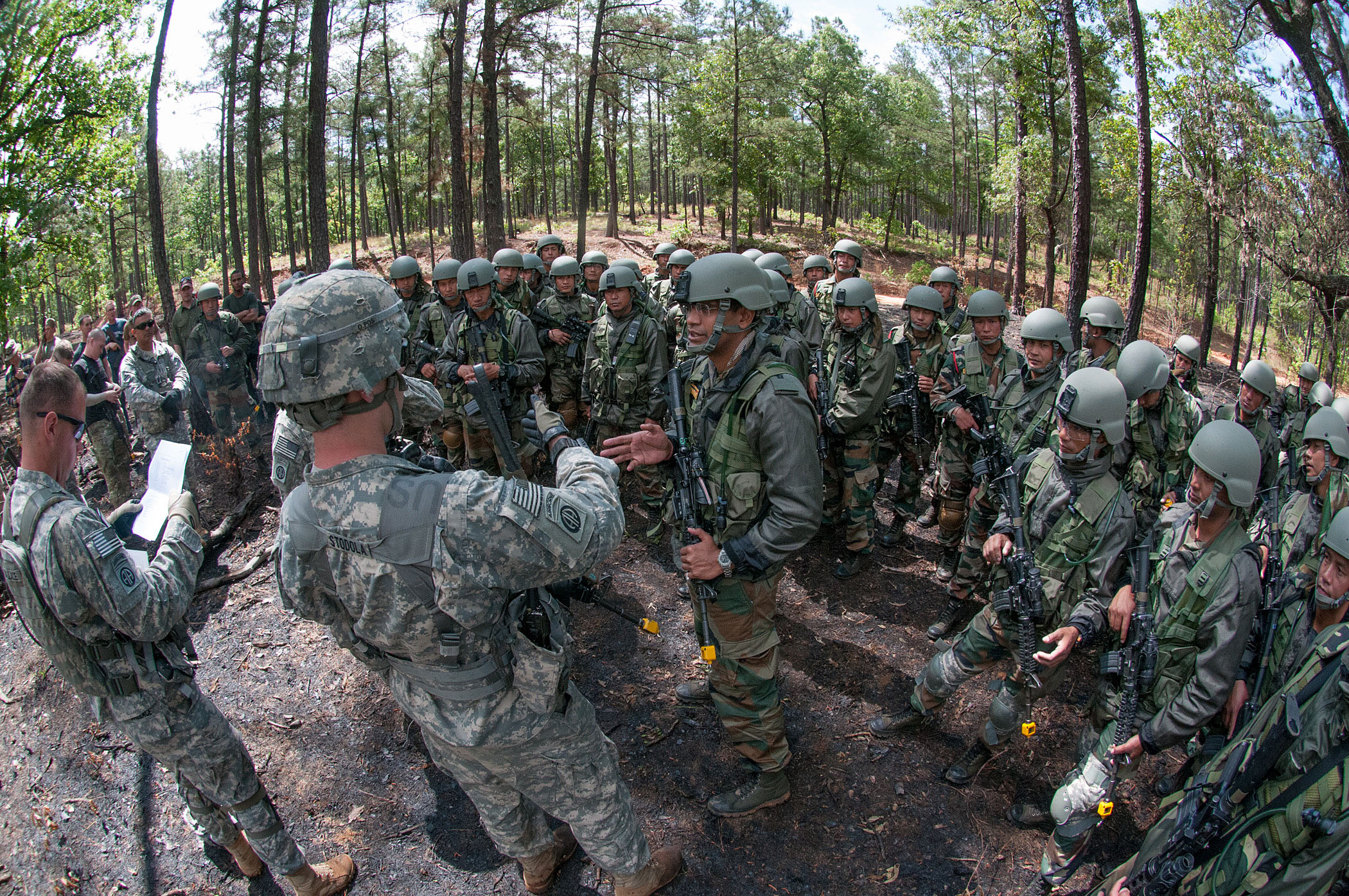
U.S. Army paratroopers and Indian Army soldiers after a simulated patrol, 2013

In 2018, the RAND Corporation published the results of a study of contemporary American soldiers in Life as a Private: A Study of the Motivations and Experiences of Junior Enlisted Personnel in the U.S. Army. The study found that "soldiers join the Army for family, institutional, and occupational reasons, and many value the opportunity to become a military professional. They value their relationships with other soldiers, enjoy their social lives, and are satisfied with Army life." However, the authors cautioned that the survey sample consisted of only 81 soldiers and that "the findings of this study cannot be generalized to the U.S. Army as a whole or to any rank."

=== Length of service ===
The length of time an individual is required to serve as a soldier has varied by country and historical period, whether the individual has been drafted or has voluntarily enlisted. Such service, depending on the army's staffing needs or the individual's fitness and eligibility, may involve fulfilling a contractual obligation. That obligation might extend for the duration of an armed conflict or may be limited to a set number of years in active duty and/or inactive duty.

As of 2023, service in the U.S. Army is for a Military Service Obligation of 2 to 6 years of active duty with a remaining term in the Individual Ready Reserve. Individuals may also enlist for part-time duty in the Army Reserve or National Guard. Depending on need or fitness to serve, soldiers usually may reenlist for another term, possibly receiving monetary or other incentives.

In the U.S. Army, career soldiers who have completed at least 20 years of service are eligible to receive a retirement pension. The size of the pension as a percentage of the soldier's salary usually increases with the length of time served on active duty.

== In media and popular culture ==
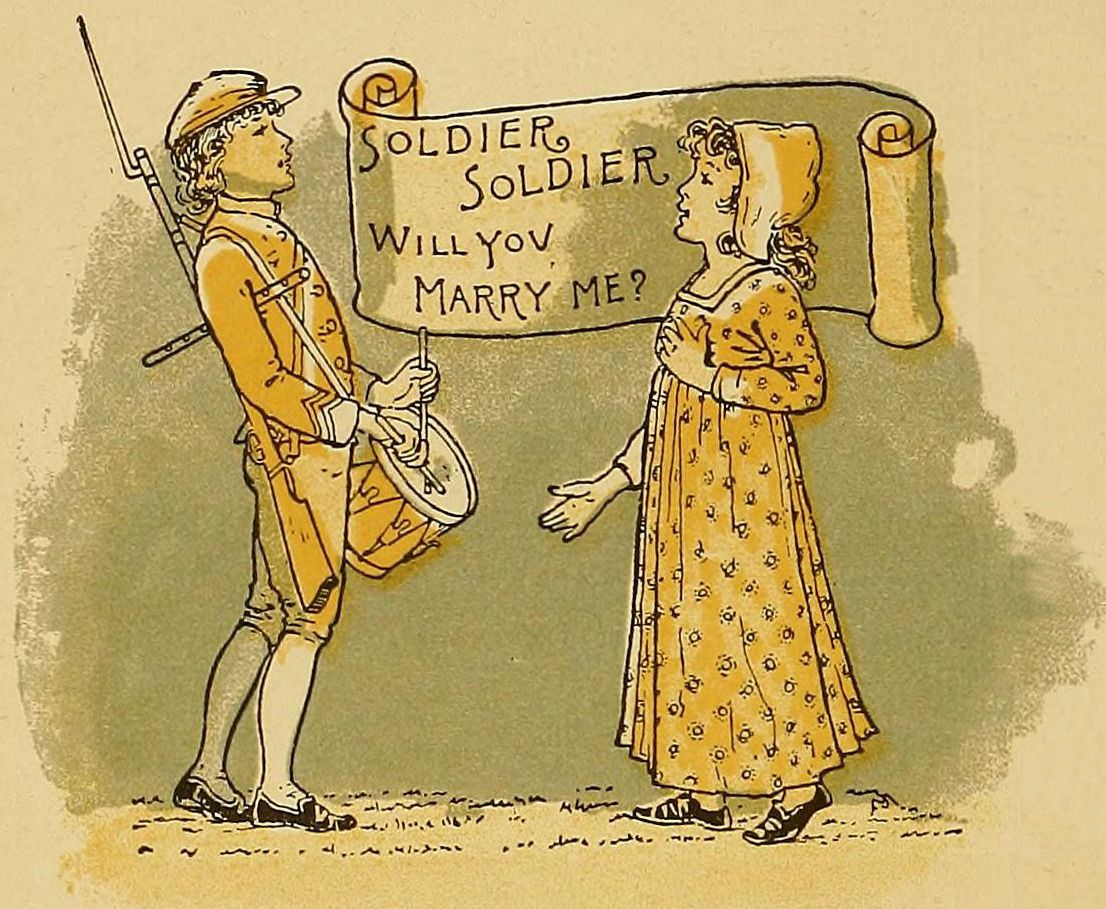
An illustration of a children's singing game about a woman's attempts to court a soldier, 1890

Since the earliest recorded history, soldiers and warfare have been depicted in countless works, including songs, folk tales, stories, memoirs, biographies, novels, and other narrative fiction; drama; films; and, more recently, television and video, comic books, graphic novels, and games. Often, these portrayals have emphasized the heroic qualities of soldiers in war, but at times have highlighted war's inherent dangers, confusion, and trauma, and their effects on individual soldiers and others.

== See also ==
- Airman
- Combatant
- Marine
- Mercenary
- Military compensation
- Military ranks
- Paratrooper
- Prisoner of war
- Sailor
- Veteran
- Women in the military by country
