= Agba Otikpo Mézodé =

Central African politician and diplomat

Georges Agba Otikpo Mézodé

Minister of Foreign Affairs
- In office 5 April 2001 – 16 January 2003
- President: Ange-Félix Patassé
- Prime Minister: Martin Ziguélé
- Preceded by: Marcel Metefara
- Succeeded by: Martial Beti Marace

Minister for the Promotion of Civic Culture in charge of relations with parliament
- In office 1 November 1999 – 5 April 2001
- President: Ange-Félix Patassé
- Prime Minister: Anicet-Georges Dologuélé
- Preceded by: Juliette Nzekou Dongoya (as Minister responsible for Relations with Parliament)
- Succeeded by: Michel Doko (as Minister responsible for Relations with Parliament)

Minister of National Education and Scientific Research
- In office 15 January 1999 – 1 November 1999
- President: Ange-Félix Patassé
- Prime Minister: Anicet-Georges Dologuélé
- Preceded by: Albert Mberio
- Succeeded by: Éloi Anguimate

Georges Agba Otikpo Mézodé is a politician, diplomat, and writer from the Central African Republic. Otikpo Mézodé was named foreign minister of his country on 5 April 2001 in Martin Ziguélé government alongside finance minister Eric Sorongopé and Interior Minister Théodore Bikoo. He left office in 2003.

== Career ==
During Kolingba presidency, he was the cultural adviser at Central African Republic embassy in Paris. In 1993, he was elected as a member of National Assembly representing Grimari. In January 1999, Dologuélé appointed Mézodé minister of national education and scientific research. He then served as a minister of the promotion of civic culture in charge of relations with the parliament from 1999 to 2001 and later as a minister of foreign affairs. On 16 January 2003, Mézodé became the diplomatic adviser to Patassé. However, the 2003 coup forced him to move to France.

Preceded by Marcel Metefara	Foreign Minister of the Central African Republic; 2001-2003	Succeeded by Martial Beti Marace
