= Marie Solange Pagonendji-Ndakala =

Central African politician

Minister of Tourism Development and Crafts
- In office 19 January 2009 – 22 April 2011
- President: François Bozizé
- Prime Minister: Faustin-Archange Touadéra
- Preceded by: Bernadette Sayo
- Succeeded by: Sylvie Annick Mazoungou

Minister of Family, Social Affairs and National Solidarity
- In office 2 September 2004 – 19 January 2009
- President: François Bozizé
- Prime Minister: Célestin Gaombalet; Élie Doté; Faustin-Archange Touadéra
- Preceded by: Léa Doumta
- Succeeded by: Bernadette Say

Personal details
- Born: April 21, 1962 (age 64) Bangui, Central African Republic

Marie Solange Pagonendji-Ndakala (born 21 April 1962) is a Central African Republic politician who is Minister of Family, Social Affairs and National Solidarity. During 2011, she served as President of the Gender, Human Rights Commission, at the National Assembly.

== Life ==
Born in Bangui on 21 April 1962, Ndakala is a Banda. She studied and graduated from École nationale d'administration et de magistrature. She then worked at Office centrafricain de la sécurité sociale in 1991 and Ministry of Home Affairs. From September to October 2003, she attended Dialogue national.

On 2 September 2004, Bozizé appointed Ndakala as minister of family and social affairs. She then became the minister of tourism development and crafts from 2009 to 2011. During the 2011 election, she won a seat at the National Assembly representing Bambari First District. She served as a member of parliament until 2013.

The gendarmerie arrested Ndakala in Bangui on 14 June 2025 for breaking the seal at the ASCENA real estate and destroying the properties of other people.
