= Minister of Foreign Affairs (Central African Republic) =

The Minister of Foreign Affairs of the Central African Republic (known as the Central African Empire in 1976–79) is a government minister in charge of the Ministry of Foreign Affairs of the Central African Republic, responsible for conducting foreign relations of the country.

The following is a list of foreign ministers of the Central African Republic since its founding in 1960:

No.	Name (Birth–Death)	Portrait	Tenure
Central African Republic (1960–1976)
1	Maurice Dejean (1927–1966)		1960–1963
2	Jean-Christophe Mackpayen (1934–1981)		1963–1964
3	Antoine Guimali (b. 1928)		1964–1967
4	Jean-Arthur Bandio (1923–1992)		1967–1968
5	Maurice Gouandjia (1925–1988)		1968–1969
6	Nestor Kombot-Naguemon (1934–2004)		1969–1970
(5)	Maurice Gouandjia (1925–1988)		1970–1971
7	Clément-Michel N'Gai Voueto		1971
8	Joseph Potolot (1939–af. 1985)		1971–1975
9	Antonio Franck (1927–2006)		1975–1976
Central African Empire (1976–1979)
10	Jean-Paul Mokodopo (1935–1984)		1976–1977
11	Michel Gbezera-Bria (b. 1946)		1977–1978
(10)	Jean-Paul Mokodopo (1935–1984)		1978–1979
Central African Republic (1979–present)
12	Sylvestre Bangui (1934–1996)		1979–1980
13	Simon Bédaya-Ngaro (1936–2006)		1980–1981
14	Jean-Pierre Sohahong-Kombet (1935-2017)		1981
15	Jean-Louis Gervil-Yambala (1946–2001)		1981–1983
16	Michel Sallé (b. 1952)		1983–1984
(7)	Clément-Michel N'Gai Voueto		1984–1985
17	Jean-Louis Psimhis (1936–?)		1985–1988
(11)	Michel Gbezera-Bria (b. 1946)		1988–1990
18	Laurent Gomina-Pampali (b. 1949)		1990–1991
19	Christian Lingama-Toleque (b. 1936)		1991–1992
20	Jean-Marie Bassia		1992–1993
(13)	Simon Bédaya-Ngaro (1936–2006)		1993–1996
(11)	Michel Gbezera-Bria (b. 1946)		1996–1997
21	Jean Mette-Yapende		1997–1999
22	Marcel Metefara (?–2009)		1999–2001
23	Agba Otikpo Mézodé		2001–2003
24	Martial Beti Marace (b. 1959)		2003
25	Karim Meckassoua (b. 1953)		2003
26	Charles Wénézoui (1950?–2007)		2003–2005
27	Jean-Paul Ngoupandé (1948–2014)		2005–2006
28	Côme Zoumara (b. 1959?)		2006–2008
29	Dieudonné Kombo Yaya		2008–2009
30	Antoine Gambi		2009–2013
31	Parfait Anicet Mbay		2013
32	Charles-Armel Doubane (b. 1966)		2013
33	Léonie Banga-Bothy		2013–2014
34	Toussaint Kongo-Doudou		2014–2015
35	Samuel Rangba (b. 1973?)		2015–2016
(32)	Charles-Armel Doubane (b. 1966)		2016–2018
36	Sylvie Baïpo-Temon		2018–present
