= Battle of Bangui =

Battle of Bangui may refer to:

- Battle of Bangui (2013)
- Battle of Bangui (2021)
