= Lucienne Patassé =

Central African politician (1944–2000)

Member of the National Assembly from Nana-Bakassa
- In office 1993 – July 29, 2000

Personal details
- Born: Lucienne Lemotomo; 1944 Ubangi-Shari
- Died: July 29, 2000 (aged 56) Bangui, Central African Republic
- Resting place: Ngabawele, Central African Republic
- Party: Movement for the Liberation of the Central African People
- Spouse: Ange-Félix Patassé (divorced)
- Children: Seven

Lucienne Lemotomo Patassé (1944 – July 29, 2000) was a Central African politician and member of the National Assembly, representing the Nana-Bakassa constituency in Ouham Prefecture for two terms from 1993 to 2000. She was also the first wife of Ange-Félix Patassé, who later became President of the Central African Republic after their separation.

== Biography ==
Patassé was born Lucienne Lemotomo in 1944. She was from the village of Ngabawele, located approximately 400 kilometers north of Bangui.

She married Ange-Félix Patassé, with whom she had seven children - four girls and three boys. Ange-Félix Patassé was an opposition member during the 1970s and 1980s. At one point, Lucienne Patassé and her children were imprisoned by government authorities.

In 1982, Ange-Félix Patassé staged an attempted coup against President André Kolingba (who had recently come to power in his own 1981 Central African Republic coup d'état less than a year earlier). Patassé's coup attempt failed, forcing Ange-Félix, Lucienne, and their family to flee to Togo, where he lived in exile from 1982 until his return in 1992. During their exile in Togo, Ange-Félix Patassé separated from and divorced Lucienne Patassé. He soon married his second wife, a Togolese woman named Angèle Patassé.

Ange-Félix Patassé returned to the Central African Republic in 1992 and was elected president in 1993. Lucienne Patassé, his former wife, also embarked on her own political career in the early 1990s. Lucienne Patassé was elected to her first five-year term in National Assembly in 1993, representing Nana-Bakassa as a member of the Movement for the Liberation of the Central African People (MLPC). Patassé won re-electiom to a second term in 1998 and died in office in July 2000. According to the Agence France-Presse, Lucienne Patassé came to be seen as a "symbol of Central African women's contribution to safeguarding peace and democracy".

Patassé had been hospitalized in Bangui several times between 1993 and 2000. She had sought medical treatment in Paris during the spring of 2000, but returned to the Central African Republic as her health deteriorated. Lucienne Patassé died at the Chouaib Clinic in Bangui on July 29, 2000, at the age of 56. She was survived by her former husband, then-President Ange-Félix Patassé, and their seven children.

Lucienne Patassé's state funeral was held on Thursday, August 3, 2000, at the National Assembly. Thousands of people gathered along the Bangui's main avenues to watch the funeral procession. Dignitaries in attendance included President Ange-Félix Patassé, and numerous politicians, judges, the military officers, and members of the foreign diplomatic corp. Patassé was buried in her home village of Ngabawele, 400 km. north of Bangui, on Friday, August 4, 2000.

Patassé was posthumously awarded the Grand Cross of the Order of Central African Merit, the country's highest honor.

== Honors ==
- Grand Cross of the Order of Central African Merit (Posthumous, 2000).
