= Armando Loaiza =

Bolivian civil servant

Armando Loaiza Mariaca (8 December 1943 – 18 January 2016) served as the Foreign Minister of Bolivia from 14 June 2005 to 23 January 2006 when a new administration took office.

He was born in La Paz, and died aged 72.

== See also ==
- List of foreign ministers in 2005
- List of foreign ministers in 2006

Political offices
Preceded by Juan Ignacio Siles	Minister of Foreign Affairs; 2005–2006	Succeeded by David Choquehuanca
