= Maurice Gouandjia =

Central African trade union activist, politician and diplomat

Minister of Justice
- In office 26 April 1971 – 13 September 1971
- Preceded by: Antoine Guimali
- Succeeded by: Louis Pierre Gamba
Ministerial offices
Minister of Government Secretariat
In office 5 February 1971 – 26 April 1971
Minister of Foreign Affairs
In office 25 November 1970 – 5 February 1971
Preceded by	Nestor Kombot-Naguemon
Succeeded by	Clément-Michel N'Gai Voueto
In office 10 October 1968 – 17 September 1969
Preceded by	Jean-Arthur Bandio
Succeeded by	Nestor Kombot-Naguemon
Minister of Posts and Telecommunications
In office 17 September 1969 – 25 November 1970
In office 5 April 1968 – 10 October 1968
Diplomatic posts
Ambassador of Central African Republic to Italy
In office
24 February 1973 – 19 February 1974

Personal details
- Born: 4 June 1925 Bambari, Ubangi-Shari (now the present-day Central African Republic)
- Died: 20 September 1988 (aged 63) Bangui, Central African Republic

Maurice Chrysanthe Gouandjia (4 June 1925 - 20 September 1988) was a Central African trade union activist, politician, and diplomat.

== Early life and career ==
Gouandjia was born on 4 June 1925 in Bambari. In an unknown year, he joined the country's education service and became the head of the Syndicat national des enseignants centrafricains up until 1964. Furthermore, he also served as the secretary-general of the Confédération africaine des syndicats libres (African Confederation of Free Trade Unions).

In 1964, Gouandjia was designated as the Secretary General of Union générale des travailleurs centrafricains (General Union of Central African Workers; UGTC) after the Movement for the Social Evolution of Black Africa's convention in Berbérati stipulating the establishment of sole Central African trade union. He also served as the technical director of the Central African Federation of Unions of Public Servants. As a secretary general of the worker union, he threatened to conduct a general strike in 1965. In 1966, he was arrested following a strike and was released from imprisonment a few months later. Bokassa appointed Gouandjia as the board of the Central African Order of Labor Council in January 1967.

== Political and diplomatic career ==
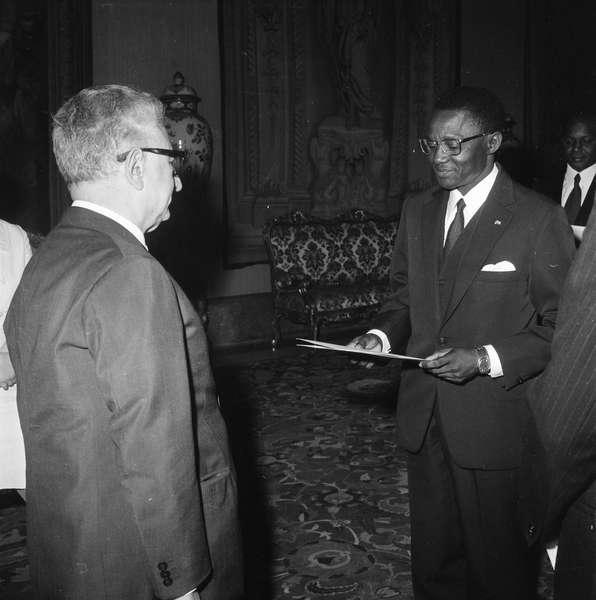
Maurice Gouandjia presented his credential letters as Ambassador of the Central African Republic to Italy to Giovanni Leone on 18 May 1973.

From 1968 to 1971, Gouandjia served in various ministerial positions under the Bokassa Regime such as Minister of Posts and Telecommunications (5 April 1968 - 10 October 1968 and 17 September 1969 - 25 November 1970), Minister of Foreign Affairs (10 October 1968 - 17 September 1969 and 25 November 1970 - 5 February 1971), Minister of Government Secretariat (5 February 1971 - 26 April 1971) and Minister of Justice (26 April 1971 - 13 September 1971).

Gouandjia's career as minister came to an end when Bokassa deposed and arrested him on 13 September 1971 during the cabinet meeting due to the accusation of witchcraft. Afterward, he was exiled to Mboki. Nevertheless, Bokassa soon pardoned Gouandjia and appointed him as the Ambassador of the Central African Republic to Italy on 24 February 1973. However, he was fired from his diplomatic position on 16 February 1974. Later, Gouandjia was arrested and imprisoned until Bokassa forgave him on 7 December 1976.

== Late political career ==
Upon the downfall of the Bokassa regime, Gouandjia joined Front patriotique oubanguien–Parti du travail (Ubangian Patriotic Front–Labor Party; FPO-PT). He was subsequently arrested at National Security in 1981 for his membership in FPO-PT. He was also reappointed as the secretary general of UGTC in the 1980s.

Gouandjia died on 20 September 1988 in Bangui.

== Personal life ==
Gouandjia was Abel Goumba's cousin. He was married, and his son, Claude Richard Gouandjia, served as Minister of Public Security, Emigration-Immigration and Public Order from 2011 to 2013.

== Bibliography ==
- Bradshaw, Richard; Rius, Juan Fandos (2016). Historical Dictionary of the Central African Republic (Historical Dictionaries of Africa). Lanham: Rowman & Littlefield.
