= Michel Adama-Tamboux =

Central African politician and diplomat (1928–2018)

President of the National Assembly of the Central African Republic
- In office 9 May 1960 – 1 January 1966
- Preceded by: Pierre Faustin Maleombho
- Succeeded by: Maurice Bethot

Personal details
- Born: 3 December 1928; Zemio, Ubangi-Shari (present-day Central African Republic)
- Died: 18 March 2018 (aged 89); Bangui, Central African Republic
- Political party: MESAN

Michel Adama-Tamboux (3 December 1928 – 18 March 2018) was a Central African politician and diplomat. He was President of the National Assembly of the Central African Republic from 1960 to 1966. He was incarcerated by Jean-Bédel Bokassa from 1966 to 1970, and served as the ambassador to the United Nations and Egypt in the 1970s.

He was a member of the political party MESAN.

== Early life and education ==
Adama was born on 3 December 1928 in Zemio. He attended schools in Brazzaville and Mouyondzi. In 1950, he went to Paris to take a one-year-long teaching course at École normale de Saint-Cloud.

== Career ==
=== Education ===
After finishing the teaching course, Adama returned to Central African Republic and worked in the education sector. He became the primary school teacher, head of the Ouham school district, principal of École régionale in Bambari, and head of the Basse Kotto school district.

=== Politics ===
In 1957, he was elected as a member of Territorial Assembly representing Kemo Gribingui district. Two years later, he was re-elected as a Territorial Assembly member.

With the support of David Dacko, Adama was elected chairman of the Legislative Assembly on 9 May 1960 after defeating his opponent, Pierre Faustin Maleombho. He served as the chairman of the parliament until 1 January 1966. Meanwhile, he was elected as MESAN’s vice president in 1962.

In 1965, he proposed the country adopt neutrality in its foreign policy. After Bokassa took power, he was arrested and put into jail. However, Bokassa pardoned him and he was released on 1 January 1970. Afterward, he was appointed as an ambassador to the United States and the United Nations (UN) on 15 May 1970. Four years later, he was appointed as an ambassador to Egypt.

After the downfall of the Bokassa regime, Adama founded a political party, the Union nationale centrafricaine (UNCA), on 3 January 1981. Under Patassé, he was appointed as chairman of the Commission électorale mixte indépendante (CEMI) to supervise the 1998 Central African parliamentary election and 1999 Central African presidential election due to his neutrality.

== Death ==
Adama died on 18 March 2018 in Bangui.

Political offices
| Preceded by Pierre Faustin Maleombho | President of the National Assembly of the Central African Republic; 1960–1966 | Succeeded by Maurice Bethott |
