= Léonie Banga-Bothy =

Central African politician

Minister of Foreign Affairs, African Integration, Francophonie, and Central Africans Abroad
- In office 12 June 2013 – 10 January 2014
- President: Michel Djotodia
- Prime Minister: Nicolas Tiangaye
- Preceded by: Charles-Armel Doubane
- Succeeded by: Toussaint Kongo-Doudou

Léonie Banga-Bothy is a Central African politician who served as Minister of Foreign Affairs of the Central African Republic from 2013 to 2014.

Banga-Bothy was appointed as Minister of Foreign Affairs by Michel Djotodia in June 2013. She was not reappointed for the next government in January 2014.
