= Côme Zoumara =

Central African politician

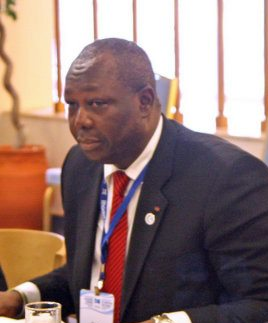

Minister of Foreign Affairs, Regional Integration, and Francophone Affairs
- In office 2 September 2006 – 28 January 2008
- President: François Bozizé
- Preceded by: Jean-Paul Ngoupandé
- Succeeded by: Dieudonné Kombo Yaya

Personal details
- Born: 1958 or 1959
- Party: Kwa Na Kwa

Côme Zoumara (born 1958 or 1959) is a political figure in the Central African Republic who was Foreign Minister from September 2006 to January 2008.

Under Presidents André Kolingba and Ange-Félix Patassé, Zoumara was an official at the Ministry of the Economy. He also worked as a consultant. In July 2003, he became advisor to President François Bozizé on defense, disarmament, and reintegration. He was appointed as the Minister of Foreign Affairs, Regional Integration, and La Francophonie on 2 September 2006, replacing Jean-Paul Ngoupandé. Zoumara served in that position until January 2008, when he was replaced in the government of Prime Minister Faustin-Archange Touadéra.

He is part of the National Convergence-Kwa na Kwa.
