= Nestor Kombot-Naguemon =

Central African politician and diplomat

Minister of Foreign Affairs
- In office 1969–1970
- President: Jean-Bédel Bokassa
- Preceded by: Maurice Gouandjia
- Succeeded by: Maurice Gouandjia

Personal details
- Born: November 14, 1934 Yaoundé, French Cameroons
- Died: 26 October 2004 (aged 69) Paris, France

Nestor Kombot-Naguemon (November 14, 1934 – October 26, 2004) was a politician and diplomat of the Central African Republic. He served as minister of foreign affairs in 1969–70. In 1991, he founded the Liberal Democratic Party (PLD).

Preceded by Maurice Gouandjia	Minister of Foreign Affairs of the Central African Republic; 1969–1970	Succeeded by Maurice Gouandjia
