= National Unity Party (Central African Republic) =

Political party in the Central African Republic

- President: Jean-Paul Ngoupandé
- Secretary-General: Léa Koyassoum Doumta
- Founded: 4 May 1997
- Headquarters: Bangui
- Ideology: Liberalism
- Political position: Centre

Website
- fodem.org

The National Unity Party (French: Parti de l'Unité Nationale, PUN) is a political party in the Central African Republic.

== History ==
The party was established in 1997. In the 1998 parliamentary elections it won three seats. In the presidential elections the following year the party nominated Jean-Paul Ngoupandé as its candidate. Ngoupandé, who had briefly served as president from June 1996 to January 1997, finished sixth out of ten candidates with 3.2% of the vote.

In the presidential elections held on 13 March 2005 Ngoupandé received 5.1% of the vote. In the simultaneous parliamentary elections the party won three seats in the National Assembly as part of the Consultation of Opposition Political Parties alliance.

In 2010 the PUN joined the Presidential Majority alliance in preparation for the 2011 general elections. The party nominated 12 candidates for the 105 seats in the National Assembly, and although the alliance won 11 seats, the PUN failed to win a seat.
