= List of presidents of the National Assembly of the Central African Republic =

== Presidents of the National Assembly of the Central African Republic ==
=== President of the Representative Council ===
Name	Entered office	Left office	Party
Georges Darlan	1947	1952	AESO

=== President of the Territorial Assembly ===
Name	Entered office	Left office	Party
Henri Mabille	1952	1957	

=== President of the Territorial Assembly/Constituent and Legislative Provisional Assembly ===
Name	Entered office	Left office	Party
Héctor Riviérez	13 June 1957	April 1959	

=== Presidents of the Legislative Assembly (later the National Assembly) ===
Name	Entered office	Left office	Party
Pierre Faustin Maleombho	30 April 1959	9 May 1960	MESAN
Michel Adama-Tamboux	9 May 1960	1 January 1966	MESAN
Maurice Bethot	1 August 1987	29 May 1989	
Michel Docco	29 May 1989	1 November 1992	
Hugues Dobozendi	3 November 1993	31 December 1998	MLPC
Luc-Appolinaire Dondon-Konambaye	1 January 1999	15 March 2003	MLPC
Célestin Leroy Gaombalet	14 June 2005	25 March 2013	Independent, KNK

=== Presidents of the National Transitional Council ===
Name	Entered office	Left office	Party
Alexandre-Ferdinand Nguendet	25 March 2013	6 May 2016	Rally for the Republic

=== Presidents of the National Assembly ===
Name	Entered office	Left office	Party
Karim Meckassoua	6 May 2016	29 October 2018	Independent
Laurent Ngon Baba	29 October 2018	5 May 2021	Action Party for Development
Simplice Sarandji	5 May 2021	Incumbent	

== See also ==
- National Assembly (Central African Republic)
