= 2002 Central African Republic coup attempt =

Date	25-31 October 2002
Location	Bangui, Central African Republic
Result	Coup attempt failed.: Ange-Félix Patassé remained in power.

Belligerents
Central African Government; MLC; Libya	Bozize loyalists

Commanders and leaders
Ange-Félix Patassé; Abdoulaye Miskine; Jean-Pierre Bemba	Francois Bozizé

Strength
200 Libyan troops	

The 2002 Central African Republic coup attempt was a failed military coup d'état in the Central African Republic (CAR) led by forces loyal to dismissed Army Chief of Staff Francois Bozizé, with the goal of overthrowing President Ange-Félix Patassé. The coup attempt lasted for six days, starting on October 25 when rebel forces assaulted the capital - Bangui - and ending by the end of the month on October 31, when they were driven out and the government regained control of the capital. The Patassé government received crucial help from the Gaddafi regime in Libya, who deployed 200 Libyan troops and a small fleet of fighter jets to their aid. They were also aided by Jean-Pierre Bemba's Movement for the Liberation of the Congo (MLC), who contributed over a thousand fighters to help. According to Amnesty International, government forces and their foreign allies committed severe human rights abuses during and after the coup attempt.

== Background ==
From its independence in 1960 from France until the 1990s, the Central African Republic was ruled by authoritarian leaders who were each ousted in military coups. After the end of the Cold War in 1991, the West became less tolerant of dictatorships in the developing world, including the Kolingba regime. Facing mounting international pressure, Andre Kolingba was forced to democratize the country by July 1991 after years of one-party rule. In 1993, the country's first ever multiparty elections were held, with Ange-Félix Patassé winning the majority of the popular vote.

However, his presidency was soon marred by unrest within the military. Dissenting factions of the military attempted multiple times to overthrow the new president, including in 1996 and 1997. Army Chief of Staff Francois Bozize helped in suppressing these army mutinies. After a third coup attempt in 2001, however, Bozize's loyalty to the president was questioned, with suspicions of his involvement in the plot. As a result, Bozize was dismissed as the Army Chief of Staff on October 26. Though Bozize attempted to resist his removal, he was ultimately forced into exile in Southern Chad by November.

== Coup attempt ==
On October 25, 2002, Bozize loyalists staged a raid on the capital, Bangui, in an attempt to overthrow President Patasse. Intense fighting engulfed the capital for six days, lasting from October 25 until October 31, as rebel forces fought with government troops. Patasse's forces, supported by 200 Libyan troops, bombing raids from Libyan jets, and more than a thousand fighters from the Movement for the Liberation of the Congo (MLC), ultimately repelled the rebels and regained control of the capital.

During the initial attack on October 25, Presidential spokesman Prosper Ndouba was taken hostage by the rebels and held in an area 300 kilometers north of Bangui, near the border with Chad. He was released on December 2.

On October 31, in the PK12 district of Bangui, dozens to over a hundred Chadian nationals were reportedly killed by members of the Presidential Guard and other government forces. Estimates suggest up to 120 Chadian civilians were killed.

During and after the failed coup attempt, severe human rights abuses were reported by Amnesty International, including unlawful killings of unarmed civilians, indiscriminate beatings of hundreds, and widespread incidents of sexual violence committed by government forces and their allies.

In the wake of the coup attempt, the Patasse government intesified its crackdown on the press. Journalists who dared to report critically faced harassment, threats, and physical violence. As a result, many journalists practiced self-censorship, avoiding criticism of the government in fear of retaliation.

The government also took measures to control the flow of information by jamming the broadcasts of foreign media, including Radio France Internationale (RFI) and the Pan-African station Africa No. 1, accusing them of biased reporting.

== See also ==
- 2001 Central African Republic coup attempt
- 2003 Central African Republic coup d'état
- Central African Republic Bush War
- Central African Republic Civil War
