= Sylvie Baïpo-Temon =

Central African politician

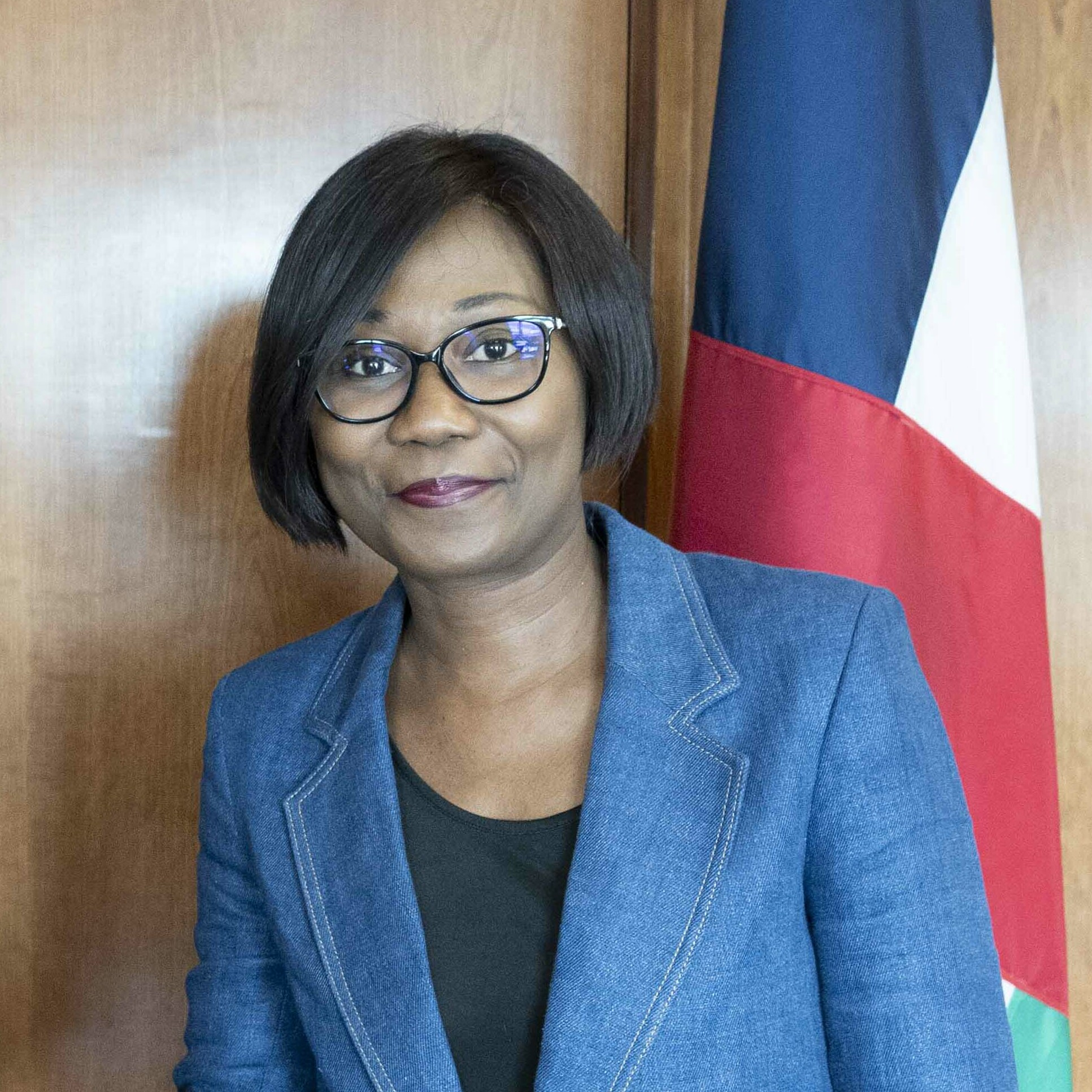
- Sylvie Baïpo-Temon in 2023

Minister of Foreign Affairs, Regional Integration, and Francophone Affairs
- Incumbent
- Assumed office 14 December 2018
- President: Faustin-Archange Touadéra
- Prime Minister: Simplice Sarandji; Firmin Ngrébada; Henri-Marie Dondra; Félix Moloua
- Preceded by: Charles-Armel Doubane

Sylvie Baïpo-Temon is a Central African politician who has served as the Minister of Foreign Affairs of the Central African Republic since 14 December 2018. She replaced Charles-Armel Doubane, allegedly under Russian pressure because Doubane took a too pro-Western stance. Before her appointment, she worked as a financial analyst at BNP Paribas beginning in 2003 and had no prior diplomatic experience. In July 2022, Sylvie Baïpo-Temon was ordered by the French tax authorities to pay €18,000 of unpaid taxes.
