= Fernand Poukré-Kono =

Central African Republic diplomat (born 1955)

H.E. Fernand Poukré-Kono

Permanent Representative to the UN for Central African Republic
- In office 15 January 2003 – 23 June 2011
- President: François Bozizé
- Succeeded by: Charles-Armel Doubane

Personal details
- Born: August 22, 1955 (age 71) N'Djamena, Chad

Fernand Poukré-Kono (born in 1955, N'Djamena, Chad) was the Permanent Representative to the United Nations for the Central African Republic, taking office in January 2003. He is married with two children.

== Education ==
Poukré-Kono attained a degree in International Relations from the State University of Kiev, in Kiev, Ukraine.

== Career ==
Poukré-Kono served as Chargé d'affaires at the Permanent Mission of the Central African Republic to the United Nations in New York City, as well as, First Counselor, and Legal Adviser for the Mission. He has held two offices at the Ministry of Foreign Affairs in Bangui, Director for International Organizations and Chief of the United Nations Section.

== See also ==
- List of current permanent representatives to the United Nations
