= Military compensation =

Pay system for a military member

Military pay or military compensation is the pay system whereby members of the military are compensated for their participation in the military.

As parts of government pay systems, military pay typically does not compete with private military compensation.

Because military service requires fit soldiers and commitments that might reach well beyond civilian employment, governments typically provided additional health care, military housing and retirement or veteran's benefits.

== International pay differences ==
Basic annual pay to rank in US dollars for the minimum per rank excluding all additional allowances, bonuses and benefits:

Pay to rank in US dollar
Country	Private (OR-3)	Sergeant (OR-5)	Lieutenant (OF-1)
Australia	$32,820	$43,971	$36,332
Canada	$31,604	$61,598	$41,772
France			
Germany	$33,600		
Greece	$9,250	$11,000	$13,500
Italy			
Ireland	$30,600	$41,200	$37,200
Japan			
Malta			$24,100
New Zealand	$35,956	$48,200	$42,000
Poland	$11,300	$13,800	$16,400
Russia			
United Kingdom	$26,000	$47,000	$43,900
United States	$29,815	$36,018	$47,980

1. Australia
2. Canada
3. United States
4. France
5. United Kingdom
6. Germany
7. Japan
8. Russia
9. Italy

Exchange rates used were accurate as of 02/04/2018. Pay ranking does not include additional benefits such as medical, pension, living expenses and bonuses (for example, hazard pay, hardship allowance, field allowance, etc.)

Overall, Australia’s military personnel are paid the highest salaries, based on the fact that their Private and Corporal pay scale goes up to 10 Pay incentives. A Private in the Australian military will make $88,748 AUD (as of Nov 14 2019) without any bonuses after 10 years. When comparing the top countries, Canada came in second place.

== By country ==
=== Australia ===
For Australian Figures (AUD>USD) used Exchange rates for 18 May, 7:36 pm UTC Australian figures exclude an approximate $13,000 AUD service & uniform allowance, ADF Superannuation, rent assist (approximate $26,000 p.a AUD for Junior officers and other ranks: depending on posting area) and other allowances such as Maritime allowance
