= Jean-Paul Ngoupandé =

Central African politician

Prime Minister of the Central African Republic
- In office 6 June 1996 – 30 January 1997
- President: Ange-Felix Patasse
- Preceded by: Gabriel Koyambounou
- Succeeded by: Michel Gbezera-Bria

Personal details
- Born: 6 December 1948 Dékoa, Kemo-Gribingui, Ubangi-Shari (now Dékoa, Kemo-Gribingui, Central African Republic)
- Died: 4 May 2014 (aged 65) Paris, France
- Party: PUN

Jean-Paul Ngoupandé (6 December 1948 – 4 May 2014) was a Central African politician who was Prime Minister of the Central African Republic from 1996 to 1997. He stood as a presidential candidate in 1999 and 2005, and he served as Minister of Foreign Affairs from 2005 to 2006. He was President of the National Unity Party (Parti de l'unité nationale, PUN), an entity which he founded in the mid-1990s. He presented himself as an enemy of corruption and a defender of fair elections and democratic institutions.

== Early life ==
He was born in Dékoa, Kemo-Gribingui.

== Political career ==
Ngoupandé served as Minister of Education from 1985 to 1989. He also served for a time as Ambassador to Côte d'Ivoire. He was appointed as prime minister by President Ange-Félix Patassé on 6 June 1996 and resigned on 30 January 1997. His tenure as prime minister (and simultaneously as minister of finance) was marked by the implementation of an open-door economic policy through structural adjustment. Ngoupandé fell into a dispute with President Patassé over the speed of these reforms, and resigned in favour of Michel Gbezera-Bria in early 1997.

Standing as his party's candidate in the presidential election of 19 September 1999 (won by the incumbent Patassé), he received 3.14 percent of the vote, in sixth place.

On 10 October 2004, the National Unity Party announced that Ngoupandé would contest the presidential election of 13 March 2005 under its banner. The election marked a return to democratic rule after the coup d'état of 15 March 2003, which installed Gen. François Bozizé as president of an interim government backed by Chad. In January 2005, Ngoupandé returned to Bangui from exile in Paris. In his campaign, he emphasized the need to bring peace and stability to the country, especially those areas most affected by rebel activity before the coup. His candidacy was originally disqualified on a technicality on 30 December 2004, along with six others, but it was reinstated by Bozizé along with two others on 4 January 2005. He received fourth place and 5.08% of the vote in the first round, and he was also elected to a seat in the National Assembly from Dékoa in the first round, one of 17 candidates (out of 105 seats) to win a seat in the first round.

On April 21, 2005, Ngoupandé signed an agreement to support Bozizé in the second round of the election. After Bozizé's victory in the second round, held in May, Ngoupandé was named Minister of Foreign Affairs in the government of newly appointed Prime Minister Élie Doté on 19 June 2005.

He served as Minister of Foreign Affairs until September 2, 2006, when he left that position in a cabinet reshuffle and instead became special advisor to Bozizé.

== Personal life ==
On January 1, 2006, Ngoupandé was taken to the Val-de-Grâce hospital in Paris after suffering a heart attack. After treatment, he returned to Bangui on February 12.

While living in Paris, Ngoupandé suffered a fall at his home and died on 4 May 2014.

== Bibliography ==
- Ngoupandé, Jean-Paul. Chronique de la crise centrafricaine 1996-1997: le syndrome Barracuda. (1997) ISBN 2-7384-5800-9
- Ngoupandé, Jean-Paul. L'Afrique sans la France: histoire d'un divorce consommé. (2002) ISBN 2-226-13088-8
- Ngoupandé, Jean-Paul. L'Afrique face à l'islam: les enjeux africains de la lutte contre le terrorisme. (2003) ISBN 2-226-13773-4

== Quotations ==
- “We are bound to live together on this CAR land. I understand the anger and the pain. However, we all have to strive and stop the cycle of violence and the settlement of scores, which could take us too far, further than we can imagine.”
- “Coming up with a plan aimed at rebuilding the country … will require that we talk about the true issues, and God knows how many they are: insecurity, the sharp financial crisis, the AIDS pandemic and all its consequences, the disaster in the area of education. The issues are many.”
- ”This country is presenting an ugly image in Africa and in the world. It is seen as not serious.”
- “Coming to power through a democratic election does not entitle anyone to commit massacres.”

Preceded by Gabriel Koyambounou	Prime Minister of the Central African Republic; 1996–1997	Succeeded by Michel Gbezera-Bria
