= Célestin Gaombalet =

Central African politician

Célestin Leroy Gaombalet
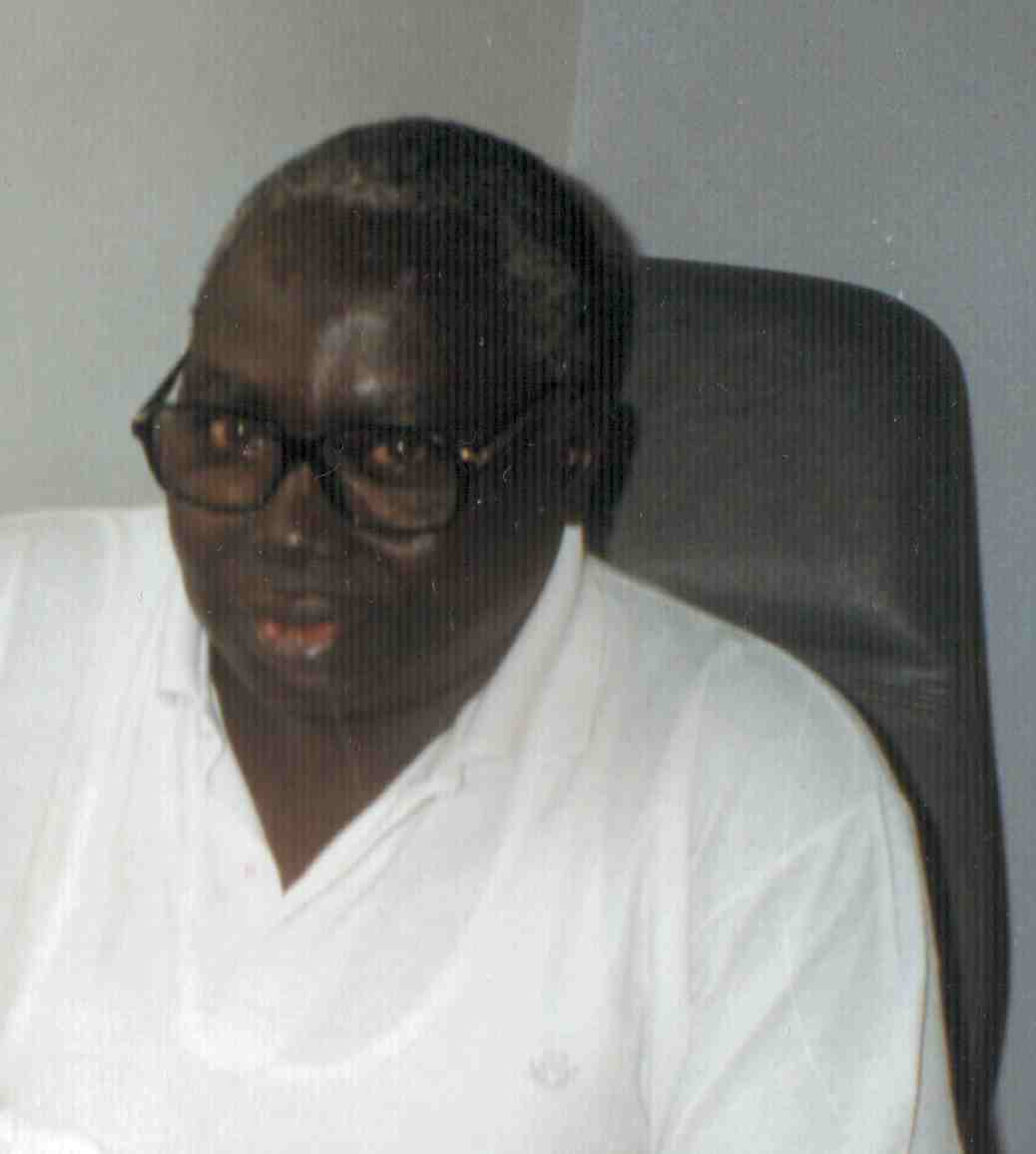

Prime Minister of the Central African Republic
- In office 12 December 2003 – 11 June 2005
- President: François Bozizé
- Preceded by: Abel Goumba
- Succeeded by: Élie Doté

President of the National Assembly of the Central African Republic
- In office 14 June 2005 – 15 April 2013
- Preceded by: Luc-Appolinaire Dondon-Konambaye
- Succeeded by: Alexandre-Ferdinand Nguendet (as President of the National Transitional Council); Abdou Karim Meckassoua (as President of the National Assembly)

Personal details
- Born: 1 January 1942 Grimari, Ubangi-Shari (present-day Grimari, Ouaka, Central African Republic)
- Died: 19 December 2017 (aged 75) Agen, France
- Party: Independent
- Profession: Politician, banker

Célestin Leroy Gaombalet (1 January 1942 – 19 December 2017) was a Central African politician who was Prime Minister of the Central African Republic from 2003 to 2005. He was President of the National Assembly of the Central African Republic from 2005 to 2013.

== Biography ==
Gaombalet was born in the village of Grimari in 1942. He began working for the Customs and Economic Union of Central Africa (UDEAC) in the 1970s, then became Director-General of the Union Bank in Central Africa, located in Bangui, before being dismissed from that post by President André Kolingba in 1981. Kolingba moved Gaombalet to a position at the Development Bank of Central African States in Brazzaville. In the early 1990s, Gaombalet returned to the Central African Republic, becoming head of the Moroccan-Central African People's Bank and later retiring.

Despite having no political experience, Gaombalet was appointed as prime minister by President François Bozizé on December 12, 2003, replacing Abel Goumba, who in turn became Bozizé's vice-president. In a reshuffle of the government on September 2, 2004, Gaombalet remained prime minister while the number of ministers was reduced to 24 from the previous 28; Gaombalet said that this did not affect the political balance and that it was necessary to save money. In the 2005 parliamentary election, Gaombalet was elected to the National Assembly as a Deputy from Bambari. At the opening of the National Assembly, he was elected as President of the National Assembly on June 7, 2005, receiving 78 votes against 18 for Luc Apollinaire Dondon Konamabaye, who had previously held the position under President Ange-Félix Patassé. Gaombalet resigned as prime minister on June 11 and was replaced by Élie Doté on June 13.

In the January–March 2011 parliamentary election, Gaombalet was re-elected to the National Assembly; when the legislature began sitting for its new term, he was re-elected as President of the National Assembly.

Political offices
Preceded by Abel Goumba	Prime Minister of the Central African Republic; 2003–2005	Succeeded by Élie Doté
Preceded by Luc-Appolinaire Dondon-Konambaye	President of the National Assembly of the Central African Republic; 2005–2013	Succeeded by Alexandre-Ferdinand Nguendet as President of the National Transitional Council of the Central African Republic
