= Battle of Bangui (2021) =

Failed coup in Central African Republic

- Part of Central African Republic Civil War
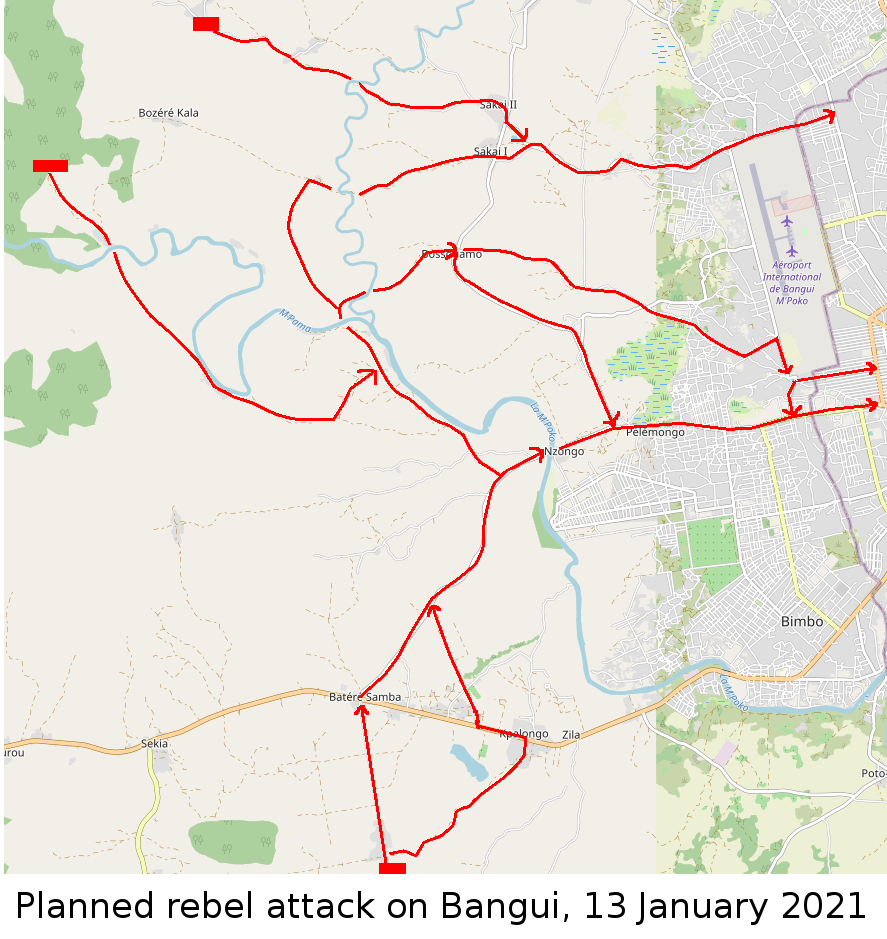
Date	13 January 2021
Location	Bangui, Central African Republic
Result	Government victory

Belligerents
Central African Republic (United Nations) MINUSCA: Rwanda; Russia	(Central African Republic) Coalition of Patriots for Change

Commanders and leaders
(Central African Republic) Faustin-Archange Touadéra	(Central African Republic) François Bozizé

Units involved
(Russia) Wagner Group	Anti-balaka; MPC; 3R; UPC; FPRC

Strength
Unknown	200 rebels

Casualties and losses
(Rwanda) One killed and one injured (Central African Republic) Several injured	30 killed, five captured
- Several civilians injured

On 13 January 2021, during the ongoing civil war in the Central African Republic, around 200 rebels from the Coalition of Patriots for Change attacked the capital Bangui in an attempt to overthrow the government, which resulted in failure.

== Background ==
In December 2020, major rebel groups in the Central African Republic created the Coalition of Patriots for Change. They were led by former president François Bozizé. They tried to prevent the organization of the 2020–21 Central African general election.

According to testimonies by members of armed groups, François Bozizé was directly involved in the preparation and coordination of the attack on Bangui. Karim Meckassoua, former president of the National Assembly, was also involved in preparations in coordination with Bozizé, Noureddine Adam, Ali Darassa, and several MPC generals. According to testimonies, he was hoping that if a coup d’état was successful, he would be the head of a transitional government. However, Bozizé was convinced that Meckassoua was trying to double-cross him, which led to the refusal of Bangui-based Anti-balaka fighters to join the attack. They were supposed to create chaos in Bangui, which would allow other fighters to enter the capital. Meckassoua, however, denied all accusations.

== Battle ==
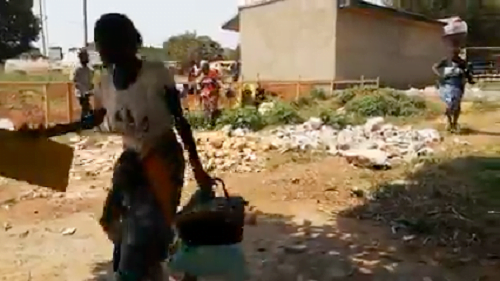
Civilians flee clashes between rebels and security forces in Bangui

Around 5:45 a.m., around ten rebels armed with rocket launchers and Kalashnikov rifles were spotted in PK 11, Damala, PK 12, and Pindao in Bangui. Around 200 rebels attacked military barracks 9 km and 12 km from the capital. They also attacked the Bimbo neighborhood. Residents reported gunfire in different parts of the city. Streets were scattered with bullet casings. The attack was repelled, and as of 8 a.m. the situation in the city was calm. One Rwandan soldier was killed, and another was injured. According to Prime Minister Firmin Ngrébada, 30 rebels were killed and five were captured. A few civilians were injured, including France Beldo, a 31-year-old woman hit by a stray bullet in the hand, chest, and shoulder.

One of the captured rebels was shown live on television. Interior Minister Henri Wanzet Linguissara claimed that he was a Chadian citizen. The Chadian government denied the claim.
