= Alexandre-Ferdinand Nguendet =

Central African politician

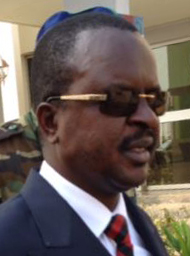

President of the National Transitional Council of the Central African Republic
- In office 15 April 2013 – 6 May 2016
- Preceded by: Célestin Gaombalet (as President of the National Assembly)
- Succeeded by: Abdou Karim Meckassoua (as President of the National Assembly)

Acting President of the Central African Republic
- In office 10 January 2014 – 23 January 2014
- Preceded by: Michel Djotodia (Transitional)
- Succeeded by: Catherine Samba-Panza (Transitional)

Personal details
- Born: 23 May 1972 (age 54) Bossangoa, Central African Republic
- Party: Rally for the Republic (2013–present)
- Other political affiliations: Central African Democratic Rally (Before 2013)

Alexandre-Ferdinand Nguendet (born 23 May 1972) is a Central African politician who served as President of the National Transitional Council of the Central African Republic from 15 April 2013 to 6 May 2016. He briefly served as Acting President of the Central African Republic in January 2014.

== Political career ==
As a member of the Central African Democratic Rally (RDC), Nguendet served for a time as a Deputy in the National Assembly, representing the fifth arrondissement of Bangui, the capital. In early 2013, Nguendet founded a new political party, the Rally for the Republic (RPR). When the Séléka rebel coalition captured Bangui in March 2013, ousting President François Bozizé, Nguendet's party was reportedly the first party to recognize the leadership of Michel Djotodia, the rebel leader who declared himself President after Bozizé fled the country.

In April 2013, under pressure from regional leaders, Djotodia attempted to legitimize his rule by creating the National Transitional Council, a 105-member provisional parliament, and then being elected by the new CNT as President, to serve during a planned 18-month transitional period, on 13 April 2013. The CNT subsequently elected Nguendet as President of the CNT on 15 April 2013; he defeated four other candidates for the post, receiving 48 votes, well ahead of the second place candidate, who received 28. The body was to act as both a parliament and a constituent assembly.

When the CNT began working in early May 2013, Nguendet explained to the body that it would have all normal legislative powers during its existence, with the exception of the right to hold a vote of no confidence in the government.

After Djotodia resigned following a CEEAC summit on 10 January 2014 as a result of his failure to contain escalating sectarian violence, Nguendet took over as Acting President. He was to serve until the CNT elected a replacement for Djotodia. The CNT elected Catherine Samba-Panza as President on 20 January.

In August 2015, following the adoption of a proposed new constitution, Nguendet called on the people to approve the proposed constitution in a referendum "to allow our country to get back on the path to a normal constitutional order".

Political offices
Preceded by Célestin Gaombalet as President of the National Assembly of the Central African Republic	President of the National Transitional Council of the Central African Republic; 2013–2016	Succeeded by Karim Meckassoua as President of the National Assembly of the Central African Republic
Preceded by Michel Djotodia; Transitional	President of the Central African Republic; Acting; 2014	Succeeded by Catherine Samba-Panza; Transitional
