= Gabriel Koyambounou =

Central African politician

Prime Minister of the Central African Republic
- In office 12 April 1995 – 6 June 1996
- President: Ange-Felix Patasse
- Preceded by: Jean-Luc Mandaba
- Succeeded by: Jean-Paul Ngoupandé

Personal details
- Born: August 19, 1947 (age 78) Bangui
- Party: MLPC

Gabriel Jean-Edouard Koyambounou (August 19, 1947) is a Central African politician who was prime minister of the Central African Republic from 12 April 1995 to 6 June 1996. He is currently the first vice-president of the Movement for the Liberation of the Central African People (MLPC).

Koyambounou was acquitted of misuse of public funds on 6 December 2004. After MLPC first vice-president Luc Dondon Apollinaire Konamabaye was suspended from his duties, Koyambounou, who was second vice-president, took over as first vice-president in an interim capacity in January 2006.

Preceded by Jean-Luc Mandaba	Prime Minister of the Central African Republic; 1995–1996	Succeeded by Jean-Paul Ngoupandé
