= Michel Gbezera-Bria =

Central African politician and diplomat

Prime Minister of the Central African Republic
- In office 30 January 1997 – 4 January 1999
- President: Ange-Felix Patasse
- Preceded by: Jean-Paul Ngoupandé
- Succeeded by: Anicet-Georges Dologuélé

Personal details
- Born: January 1, 1946 (age 79) Bossangoa, Ubangi-Shari (now Bossangoa, Central African Republic)

Michel Gbezera-Bria (born 1 January 1946) is a Central African politician and diplomat. He was Prime Minister of the Central African Republic from 1997 to 1999. He is currently the CAR Ambassador to France.

== Early life ==
Gbezera-Bria was born in Bossangoa on 1 January 1946. He is a member of the Gbaya ethnic group. He was educated at College Emile Gentil in Bangui and studied law in Brazzaville. Gbezera-Bria later studied economics at Institut d'administration publique in Caen, France. He worked as a lawyer before entering politics.

== Political career ==
Jean Bedel Bokassa named Gbezera-Bria deputy minister of diplomatic and consular delegations and payment of public debt on 9 June 1975. On 4 April 1976, Gbezera-Bria was appointed deputy Minister of Foreign Affairs. He became minister of public service, labor, and social security on 14 December 1976, serving until his appointment as Minister of Foreign Affairs on 18 April 1977. Gbezera-Bria served as foreign minister until 17 July 1978. Between 1980 and 1987 he was the Central African ambassador to the United Nations in Geneva and New York. Back in the Central African government, from 1988 to 1990 he was foreign minister and minister of justice. On 28 May 1989, he signed the technical-scientific-cultural protocol of cooperation with Israel after President Andre Kolingba was unable to attend the conference due to Sudanese air traffic controllers refusing to allow his airplane to fly over Sudan's airspace. He served as private secretary to President Ange-Felix Patasse from 1995 to 17 June 1996, when he was again named foreign minister.

Patasse tried to form a government of national unity and appointed Gbezera-Bria Prime Minister on 30 January 1997. He formed a new "Government of Action" after a mutiny in the armed forces. Charles Herve Wenezoui was named head of his cabinet. Anicet Georges Dologuélé replaced him as premier 4 January 1999. Gbezera-Bria subsequently served as Minister of State. He served as president of Ecobank Centafrique from 2007 to 2009. In 2008, he became chief of staff to François Bozizé. Gbezera-Bria received the award of the CAR merit in January 2012. On 8 January 2015, he was appointed ambassador to France by President Catherine Samba-Panza. He presented his credentials to French President François Hollande on 29 January 2015, and the two discussed the current situation in the Central African Republic.

== Notes ==
Preceded by Jean-Paul Ngoupandé	Prime Minister of the Central African Republic; 1997–1999	Succeeded by Anicet Georges Dologuélé
