= 1981 Central African Republic coup d'état =

Deposition of David Dacko by André Kolingba

Date	1 September 1981
Location	Central African Republic
Result	Coup attempt succeeds.: David Dacko is exiled.; André Kolingba comes to power.

Belligerents
Central African Government; Armed Forces loyalists	Armed Forces rebels Supported by: France

Commanders and leaders
David Dacko	André Kolingba

On 1 September 1981, General André Kolingba deposed President David Dacko of the Central African Republic in a bloodless coup while Dacko was away from the country traveling to an official state visit in Libya. The day after the coup a "Military Committee for National Recovery" (French: Comite Militaire pour le Redressement National, CMRN) was established and was led by Kolingba. The CMRN then suspended the constitution and limited political party activity.

Central African Republic specialists Richard Bradshaw and Carlos Fandos-Rius state that, in the 1981 coup, Kolingba "seized power with French support". Likewise, historian Brian Titley notes that the 800 French soldiers in the country had orders not to interfere. In 1991, DGSE head Pierre Marion admitted that the French military advisor Jean-Claude Mantion had played a role in the coup; Mantion had been stationed in the Central African Republic to serve as head of the Presidential Guard shortly before the coup took place, and retained this powerful position throughout the Kolingba regime.

Kolingba's military regime promised to hold election and get rid of corruption but over the next four years corruption increased and the CMRN repeatedly pushed back planned election until 1987. In 1982 the regime survived a coup attempt.
