= Karim Meckassoua =

Central African politician

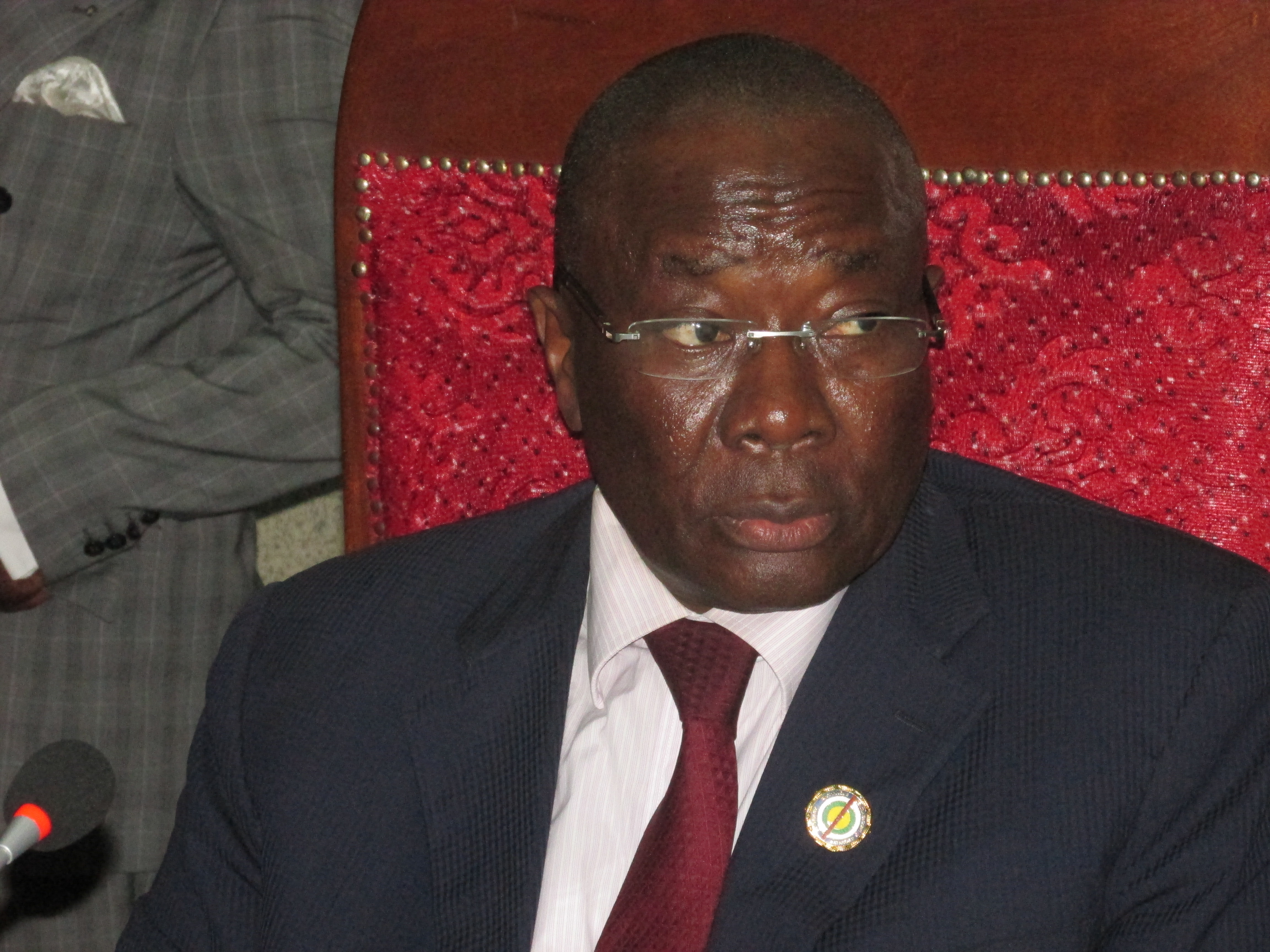
- Abdoul Karim Meckassoua in May 2016

President of the National Assembly of the Central African Republic
- In office 6 May 2016 – 29 October 2018
- President: Faustin-Archange Touadéra
- Prime Minister: Simplice Sarandji
- Preceded by: Alexandre-Ferdinand Nguendet
- Succeeded by: Laurent Ngon Baba
Ministerial offices
Minister of State in charge of Posts, Telecommunications and New Technologies
In office 22 March 2011 – 3 August 2013
Preceded by	Thierry Savonaroye Maléyombo
Succeeded by	Henri Pouzère
Minister of State for Communication, National Reconciliation, Democratic Culture and the Promotion of Human Rights
In office 2 September 2006 – 28 January 2008
Preceded by	Jean-Eudes Téya
Succeeded by	Cyriaque Gonda
Minister of State, in charge of National Education, Literacy, Higher Education, and Research
In office 12 December 2003 – 19 June 2005
Preceded by	Bévarah Lala
Succeeded by	Timoléon M'baïkoua
Minister of Foreign Affairs, Regional Integration and La Francophonie
In office 31 March 2003 – 12 December 2003
Preceded by	Martial Beti Marace
Succeeded by	Charles Hervé Wénézoui

Personal details
- Born: Abdoul Karim Meckassoua; 31 December 1953 (age 72) Bangui, Ubangi-Shari (present-day Central African Republic)
- Party: Independent

Abdoul Karim Meckassoua (born 31 December 1953 in the Bangui neighborhood of PK5) is a Central African politician who served as the President of the National Assembly of the Central African Republic from 6 May 2016 to 29 October 2018. He is the second Muslim head of government of the largely Roman Catholic majority African country following Michel Am-Nondokro Djotodia.

On 15 August 2021, he fled the country after the Constitutional Court impeached him following accusations of participation in the 2021 coup attempt.

Political offices
Preceded by Alexandre-Ferdinand Nguendet as President of the National Transitional Council of the Central African Republic	President of the National Assembly of the Central African Republic; 2016–2018	Succeeded by Laurent Ngon Baba
