= Élie Doté =

Prime Minister of Central African Republic

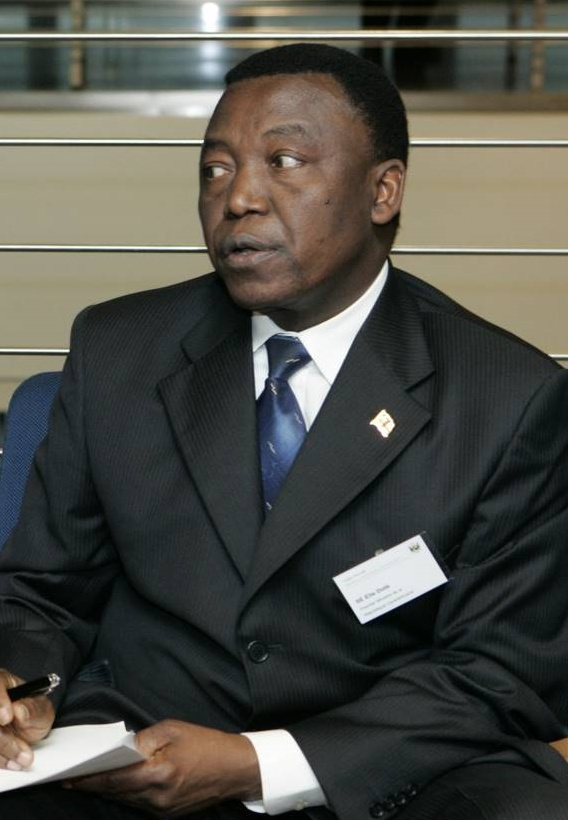

Prime Minister of the Central African Republic
- In office 13 June 2005 – 22 January 2008
- President: François Bozizé
- Preceded by: Célestin Gaombalet
- Succeeded by: Faustin-Archange Touadéra

Personal details
- Born: 9 July 1948 (age 78) Bangui, Ubangi-Shari, French Equatorial Africa (now the Central African Republic)
- Party: Independent

Élie Doté (born 9 July 1948) is a Central African politician. He was Prime Minister of the Central African Republic from June 2005 to January 2008.

== Biography ==
Born in Bangui on 9 July 1948, Doté has a doctorate degree in rural economy from the University of Montpellier in France. He worked at the Agriculture and Animal Husbandry Ministry from 1974 to 1980 before becoming an expert at the African Development Bank (AfDB) in Abidjan, Ivory Coast. At the AfDB, he held various portfolios within the agro-economic field. His last post at the AfDB was that of chief of agriculture and rural development from 2001 to 2005. Doté received the National Order of Burkina Faso on 8 April 2005.

His appointment as prime minister by President François Bozizé on 13 June 2005, following a presidential and parliamentary election, was considered surprising; Doté, who had previously been working outside the country in Tunis for the AfDB, was at the time largely unknown in CAR. Pierre Gonifei-Ngaibonanou had met Doté in Tunis and mentioned he would be a good candidate for prime minister to Bozizé. In the end, he was chosen for his "technocratic qualities" and was responsible for implementing the development program developed by Bozizé. In a cabinet reshuffle in early September 2006, Doté became Minister of Finance in addition to his post as prime minister.

On 17 January 2008, after a civil service strike began early in the month, demanding that the government pay wage arrears, a majority of deputies in the National Assembly filed a censure motion against Doté's government, and the motion was to be considered on 19 January. On 18 January 2008, it was announced that Doté and his government had resigned and Bozizé had accepted the resignation. His successor, university rector Faustin-Archange Touadéra, was appointed by Bozizé on 22 January 2008.

In 2015, he gave a speech requesting help from France and the international community to end the chaos in his country. He called on President Catherine Samba-Panza and her government to step down for their failure to implement the roadmap for transition.

== Notes ==
Political offices
Preceded by Célestin Gaombalet	Prime Minister of the Central African Republic; 2005–2008	Succeeded by Faustin-Archange Touadéra
