= 1982 Central African Republic coup attempt =

1982 Central African Republic coup d'état attempt
Date	3 March 1982
Location	Central African Republic
Result	Coup attempt failed.: André Kolingba remained in power.

Belligerents
Central African Government; Armed Forces loyalists	Armed Forces rebels MLPC party

Commanders and leaders
André Kolingba	Ange-Félix Patassé; David Dacko

On 3 March 1982, opposition politician and leader of the MLPC party, Ange-Félix Patassé, returned from exile to the Central African Republic and staged an unsuccessful coup against General André Kolingba (who himself took power in the 1981 coup d'état) with the help of a few military officers, such as General François Bozizé, who accused Kolingba of treason and proclaimed the change of power in a radio announcement.

Four days later, having failed to gain the support of the Central African Armed Forces, Patassé went in disguise to the French Embassy in Bangui to seek refuge. After heated negotiations between the Kolingba government and France, Patassé was allowed to leave for exile in Togo, where he lived from 1982 until his return to the Central African Republic in 1992. Bozizé fled to the north of the country with 100 soldiers, before obtaining refuge in France.

== Bibliography ==
- Kalck, Pierre (2005), Historical Dictionary of the Central African Republic (3rd English ed.), Lanham, Maryland: The Scarecrow Press, ISBN 0-8108-4913-5
