= Timeline of Bangui =

The following is a timeline of the history of the city of Bangui, Central African Republic.

== 19th century ==
- 1889 - French military post established at crossing of Mpoko River and Ubangi River.
- 1891 - French military post relocated to present site of city.

== 20th century ==
- 1904 - 1 July: Bangui becomes administrative seat of French colonial Ubangi-Shari.
- 1906 - 11 December: Bangui becomes administrative seat of French colonial Ubangi-Shari-Chad.
- 1912
  - Bangui becomes a commune mixte.
  - Jean Marchessou becomes mayor.^{(fr)}
- 1916 - Population: 4,003.
- 1920 - Hôtel du Gouverneur built.
- 1932 - Population: 16,903.
- 1935 - Chamber of Commerce established.
- 1937 - Cathédrale Notre-Dame built.
- 1945 - Olympic Real de Bangui (football club) formed.
- 1947 - City Hall and Ngaragba Central Prison built.
- 1955
  - Bangui becomes a commune de plein exercice.
  - Roman Catholic Archdiocese of Bangui established.
- 1956
  - Municipal election held; Barthélemy Boganda elected mayor.
  - Population: 72,000.
- 1958
  - Radiodiffusion Nationale Centrafricaine headquartered in city.
  - General hospital active.
- 1960 - City becomes part of independent Central African Republic.
- 1963 - Bangui designated headquarters of the Organisation of African Unity.
- 1964
  - Bangui becomes a commune autonome.
  - Population: 111,266.
- 1966 - Boganda National Museum opens.
- 1967 - Bangui M'Poko Airport begins operating.
- 1969 - University of Bangui founded.
- 1971
  - Population: 187,000 (estimate).
  - Across river from Bangui, town of Zongo founded in the Democratic Republic of the Congo.
- 1977 - 4 December: Coronation of Bokassa I.
- 1979
  - April: Student protest; crackdown.
  - September: Operation Caban.
- 1981 - March: Post-election unrest.
- 1984 - Population: 473,817 (estimate).
- 1986 - E le Songo newspaper begins publication.
- 1987 - DFC 8ème Arrondissement (football club) formed.
- 1990 - National Société Centrafricaine de Télécommunications headquartered in city.
- 1996 - May: Military mutiny occurs in Bangui.
- 2000
  - Radio Ndeke Luka begins broadcasting from Bangui.
  - Cécile Guéret becomes mayor.

== 21st century ==
- 2003
  - 15 March: Bozizé stages governmental coup in Bangui.
  - Bozizé replaces Guéret with Jean-Barkès Gombé-Ketté.
  - Population: 531,000.
- 2005 - August: Flood.
- 2006 - Barthélemy Boganda Stadium opens.
- 2009 - March: "French troops reportedly deploy in Bangui after rebels infiltrate the capital."
- 2010 - 15 January: Solar eclipse.
- 2012 - Population: 750,000.
- 2013
  - 23 March: "Séléka rebels overrun the capital and seize power" during the Central African Republic Civil War (2012–present).
  - March–December: Violent unrest; many killed.
  - Residents flee city; refugee camps develop around airport and elsewhere.
  - June: Catherine Samba-Panza appointed mayor.
- 2014
  - February: Hyacinthe Wodobodé becomes mayor.
  - May: European Union Force RCA "troops take charge of security at the airport in Bangui."
  - 28 May: Church of Fatima attacked.
- 2015
  - September: "Communal clashes break out in Bangui after Muslim taxi-driver attacked."
  - November: Catholic pope visits city.
- 2016
  - May: Émile Gros Raymond Nakombo becomes mayor.
  - October: Anti-UN protest; crackdown.
  - December: Refugee camp at airport dismantled.
- 2018 - 1 May: Attack occurs at Notre Dame de Fatima church.

== See also ==
- Bangui history
- List of mayors of Bangui

== Bibliography ==
in English

- Paul Tiyambe Zeleza; Dickson Eyoh, eds. (2003). "Bangui, Central African Republic". Encyclopedia of Twentieth-Century African History. Routledge. ISBN 978-0415234795.
- Eric Young (2010). "Bangui, Central African Republic". In Kwame Anthony Appiah; Henry Louis Gates (eds.). Encyclopedia of Africa. Oxford University Press. p. 153+. ISBN 9780195337709.

in French

- Albert Veistroffer (1933). Les origines de ses trois points les plus importants: Pointe-Noire, Brazzaville, Bangui (in French). Paris: Mercure Universel.
- Adrien-Rongier Marie-France (1981). "Les kodro de Bangui: un espace urbain 'oublié'". Cahiers d'Études africaines (in French). 21 (81): 93–110. doi:10.3406/cea.1981.2303 – via Persee.fr.
- François Villien (1985). "Habitat et habitations dans les quartiers populaires de Bangui". Cahiers d'Outre-Mer (in French). 38 – via Persee.fr.
- Jean Cantournet (1986). "Note sur les origines et la fondation de Bangui". Revue française d'histoire d'outre-mer (in French). 73 (272): 347–357. doi:10.3406/outre.1986.2550 – via Persee.fr.
- François Villien (1988). "L'agriculture dans la ville: l'exemple de Bangui". Cahiers d'Outre-Mer (in French). 41 – via Persee.fr.
- Yves Boulvert (1989). Bangui 1889-1989: Points de vue et témoignages (in French).
- F. Villien; et al. (1990), Bangui, capitale d'un pays enclavé d'Afrique centrale: étude historique et géographique (in French), Université Bordeaux, ISBN 978-2905081155
- Cyriaque-Rufin Nguimalet; et al. (2005). "Gestion de la qualité de l'eau, conflits et risques dans la ville de Bangui (République centrafricaine)". Géocarrefour (in French). 80/4 (4): 325–334. doi:10.4000/geocarrefour.1295 – via Revues.org.
- Fraternité Boganda (2011). "Genese de la ville de Bangui" (PDF). Conférences Semaine centrafricaine (in French). Toulouse – via Journaldebangui.com (Paris, OCLC 889849592).
- Thierry Bangui (2013). "L'architecture coloniale du centre-ville de Bangui (Rép. Centrafricaine)". Cahiers d'Outre-Mer (in French). 66 (261): 105–122. doi:10.4000/com.6794 – via Revues.org.

== Images ==
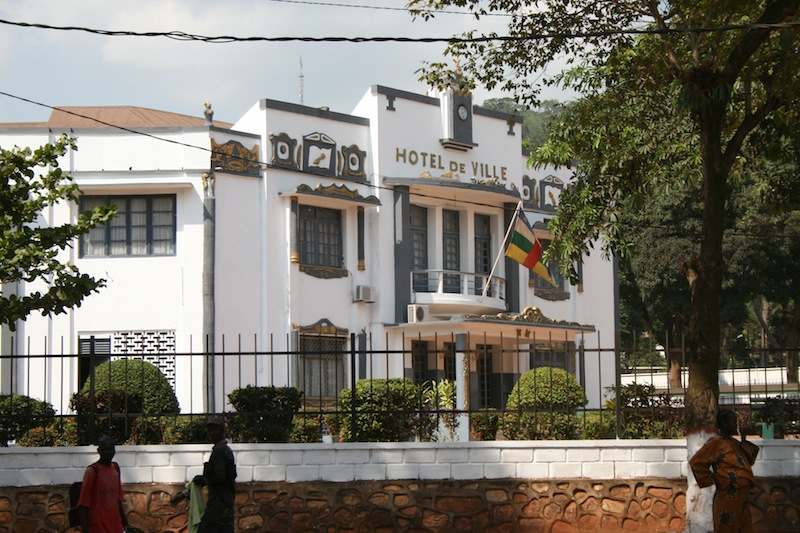
City Hall, built 1947

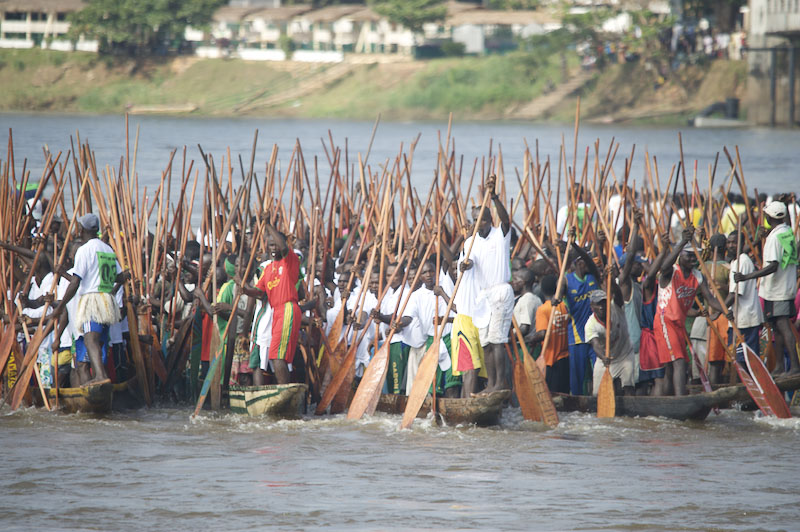
Boat race, 2010

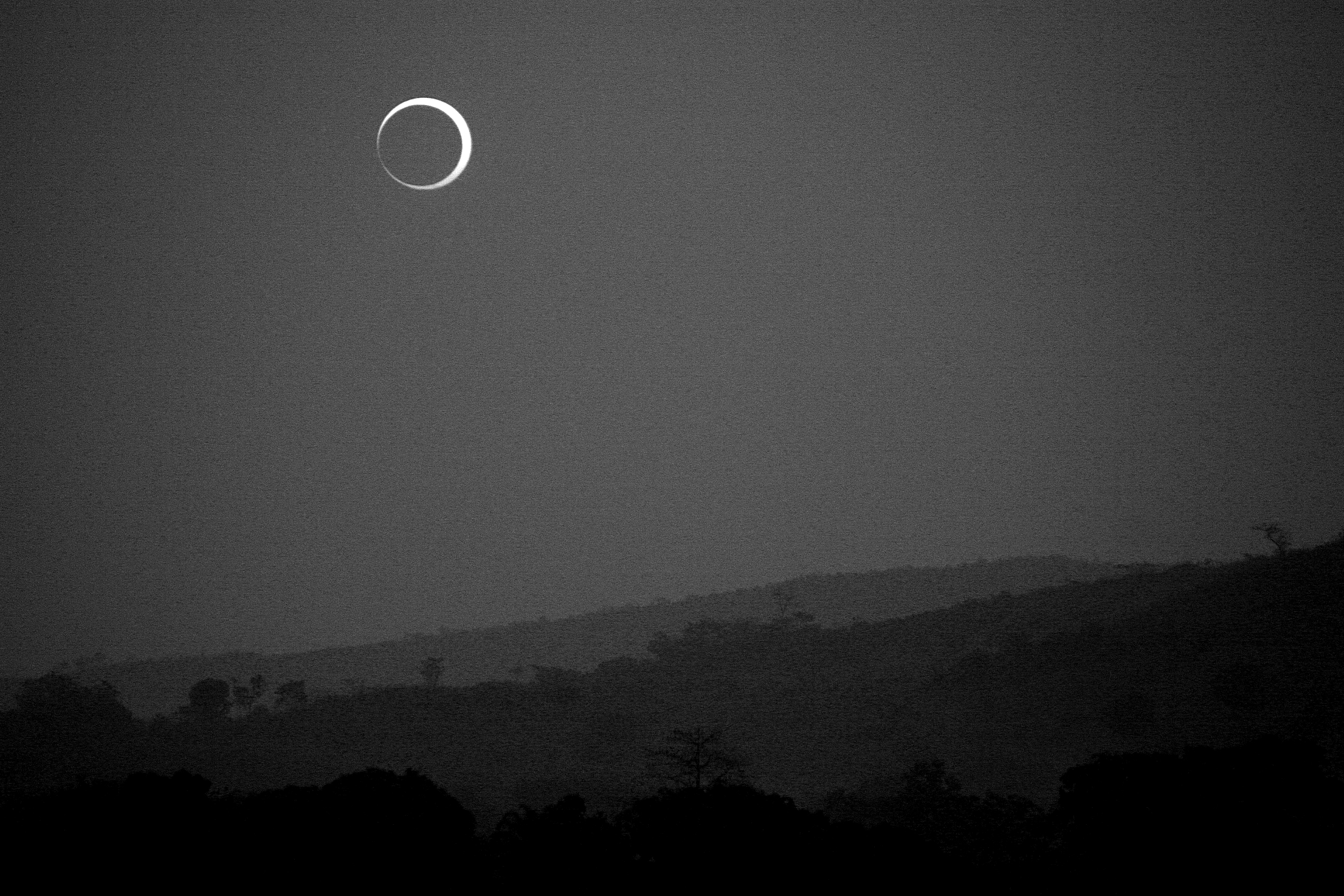
Solar eclipse, 2010

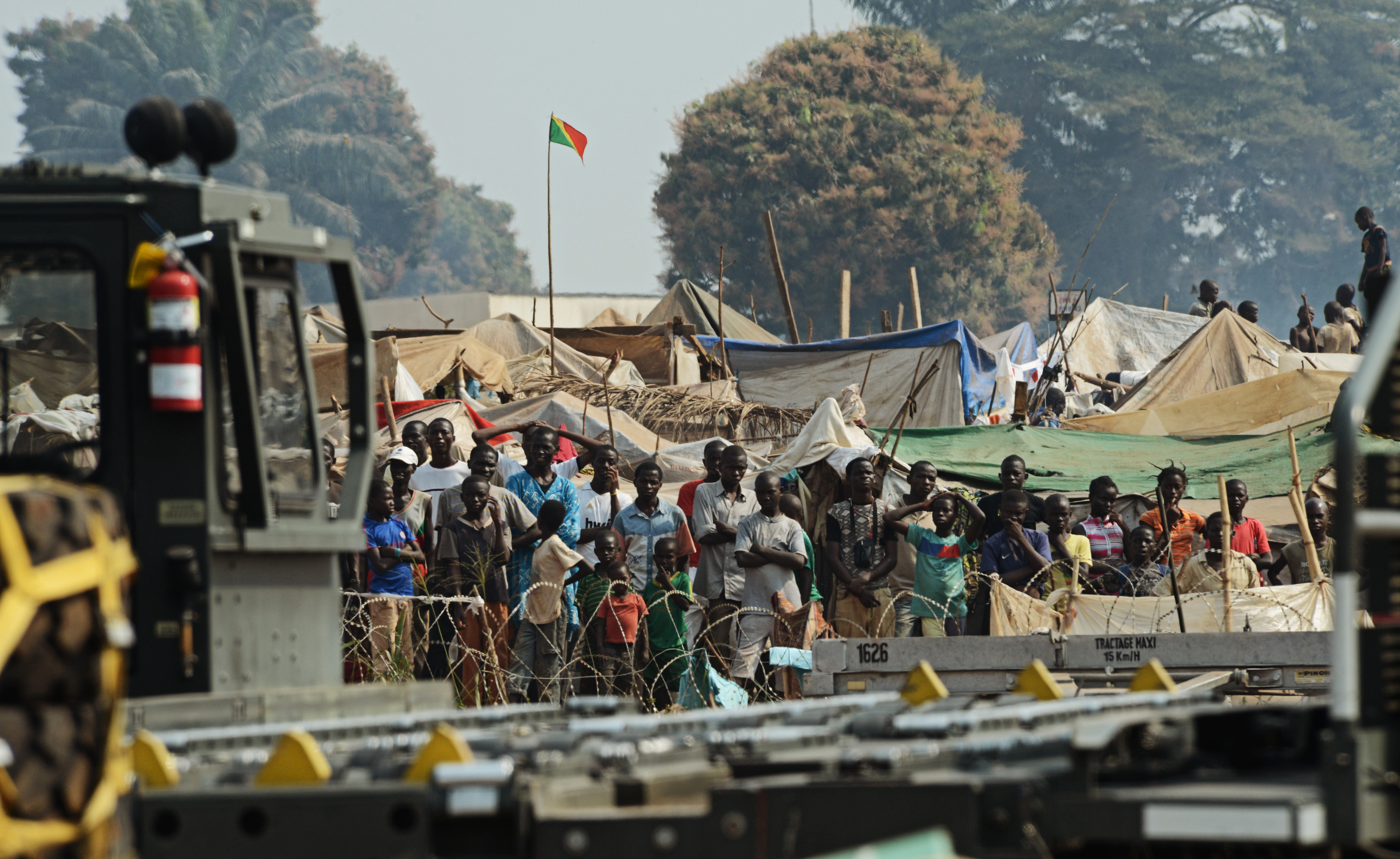
Refugees at Bangui Airport, January 2014
