= Telecommunications in the Central African Republic =

Telecommunications in the Central African Republic includes radio, television, fixed and mobile telephones, and the Internet as well as the postal system.

Persistent conflict has hampered telecommunication and media development in the Central African Republic. There are active television services, radio stations, Internet service providers, and mobile phone carriers. Radio is the most-popular communications medium.

Socatel is the leading provider for both Internet and mobile phone access throughout the country. The primary governmental regulating bodies of telecommunications are the Ministère des Postes (Ministry of Posts), and Télécommunications et des Nouvelles Technologies (Telecommunications and New Technologies). Support is received from the ITU Telecommunication Development Sector (ITU-D) within the International Telecommunication Union to improve telecommunications infrastructure.

== Radio and television ==
- Radio stations: the State-owned radio network, Radio Centrafrique, is supplemented by a small number of privately owned broadcast stations as well as a few community radio stations; transmissions of at least 2 international broadcasters are available (2007).
- The BBC World Service (90.2 FM), Radio France Internationale, and the Voice of America are available via local relays in the capital, Bangui.
- Radios: 283,000 (1997).
- Television stations: Government-owned network, Télévision Centrafricaine (TCF), provides domestic TV broadcasting; licenses for 2 private TV stations were pending (2007).
- Television sets: 18,000 (1997).

In Bangui, UN-sponsored Radio Ndeke Luka ("bird of luck") provides balanced output, and rebroadcasts international news programming. Other radio and TV stations are run by the state-run Radiodiffusion-Television Centrafricaine and provide little coverage of the political opposition. There are about two dozen privately owned radio stations. Many, such as Radio Notre Dame, run by religious organisations.

Starting 24 November 2011 La Radio et la Télévision nationale centrafricaine (TVCA) (Central African Radio (CAR) and National Television) are available via satellite. This move brought state-run national radio and television coverage to the entire country.

== Telephones ==
- Calling code: +236
- International call prefix: 00
- Main lines: 5,600 lines in use, 209th in the world (2012).
- Mobile cellular: 1.1 million lines, 157th in the world (2012).
- Telephone system: The network consists principally of microwave radio relay and low-capacity, low-powered radiotelephone communication; limited telephone service with less than one fixed-line connection per 100 persons; spurred by the presence of multiple mobile-cellular service providers, cellular usage is increasing from a low base; most fixed-line and mobile-cellular telephone services are concentrated in the capital, Bangui (2011).
- Satellite earth stations: 1 Intelsat (Atlantic Ocean) (2011).

GSM coverage was for a long time limited to the capital area. But in June 2006 coverage was expanded at least to Berberati in the western part of the country. There are currently two GSM-900 mobile operators, Telecel CAR and NationLink Telecom RCA. A third network, Centrafrique Telecom Plus closed down in late 2005 after failing to attract more than 5,000 subscribers and failing to renew its license, in accordance with the then new Bozize government policies.

== Internet ==
- Top-level domain: .cf
- Internet users:
  - 151,716 users, 160th in the world; 3.0% of the population, 195th in the world (2012).
  - 22,600 users, 192nd in the world (2009).
- Internet hosts: 20 hosts, 221st in the world (2012).
- IPv4: 4,352 addresses allocated, less than 0.05% of the world total, 0.9 addresses per 1000 people (2012).
- Internet service providers (ISPs): Moov, Orange, Socatel, and Telecel.

=== Internet censorship and surveillance ===
There are no government restrictions on access to the Internet or credible reports that the government monitors e-mail or Internet chat rooms without judicial oversight.

More than five million websites (except for Spotify was not available in that country) are available/accessible in the Central African Republic.

Although the constitution and law provide for freedom of speech and press, authorities occasionally arrest journalists critical of the government and in some cases the government impedes individuals’ right to free speech. Imprisonment for defamation and censorship were abolished in 2005; however, journalists found guilty of libel or slander face fines of 100,000 to eight million CFA francs ($200 to US$16,000). The law provides for imprisonment and fines of as much as one million CFA francs (US$2,000) for journalists who use the media to incite disobedience among security forces or incite persons to violence, hatred, or discrimination. Similar fines and imprisonment of six months to two years may be imposed for the publication or broadcast of false or fabricated information that "would disturb the peace."

== Postal system ==
L'Office National de la Poste et de l'Épargne (ONPE) is the government organization responsible for the postal service.

== See also ==
- Media of the Central African Republic
- Economy of the Central African Republic
- Central African Republic
