= 2018–19 Olympiacos F.C. season =

Olympiacos
2018–19 season
- Chairman: Giannis Moralis
- Manager: Pedro Martins
- Stadium: Karaiskakis Stadium, Piraeus
- Super League Greece: 2nd
- Greek Cup: Quarter-finals
- UEFA Europa League: Round of 32
- Top goalscorer: League: Kostas Fortounis (12); All: Kostas Fortounis (17)
- Highest home attendance: League: 31,250
- Lowest home attendance: League: 12,012
- Average home league attendance: League: 21,073
Home colours	Away colours	Third colours

The 2018–19 season was Olympiacos's 60th consecutive season in the Super League Greece and their 93nd year in existence. They also participated in the Greek Football Cup, where they reached the quarter-finals, and in the UEFA Europa League, where they reached the round of 32. For the second consecutive season, Olympiacos did not win any competition. This was their first consecutive trophyless seasons since 1994–95 to 1995–96.

== Players ==
=== First team ===
As of 1 February 2019

Squad No.	Name	Nationality	Position(s)	Place of birth	Date of birth (Age)	Previous club
Goalkeepers
1	Lefteris Choutesiotis	(Greece)	GK	Makrychori, Greece	20 July 1994 (23)	(Greece) Olympiacos U20
32	Yuri Lodygin	(Russia) (Greece)	GK	Vladimir, Russian SFSR, Soviet Union	26 May 1990 (28)	(Russia) Zenit
93	José Sá	(Portugal)	GK	Braga, Portugal	17 January 1993 (25)	(Portugal) Porto
Defenders
14	Omar Elabdellaoui	(Norway)	RB	Surnadal, Norway	5 December 1991 (26)	(England) Hull City
20	Yassine Meriah	(Tunisia)	CB	Aryanah, Tunisia	2 July 1993 (25)	(Tunisia) Sfaxien
21	Kostas Tsimikas	(Greece)	LB/LM	Thessaloniki, Greece	12 May 1996 (22)	(Greece) Olympiacos U20
23	Leonardo Koutris	(Greece) (Brazil)	LB/LM	Rhodes, Greece	23 July 1995 (22)	(Greece) PAS Giannina
25	Roderick Miranda	(Portugal)	CB	Odivelas, Portugal	30 March 1991 (28)	(England) Wolverhampton Wanderers
26	Jagoš Vuković	(Serbia)	CB/LB	Bačko Dobro Polje, Titov Vrbas, SFR Yugoslavia	10 June 1988 (29)	(Turkey) Konyaspor
34	Avraam Papadopoulos	(Greece) (Australia)	CB	Melbourne, Victoria, Australia	3 December 1984 (34)	(Australia) Brisbane Roar
35	Vasilis Torosidis	(Greece)	CB/MF	Xanthi, Greece	10 June 1985 (33)	(Italy) Bologna
66	Pape Abou Cissé	(Senegal)	CB	Pikine, Senegal	14 September 1995 (22)	(France) Ajaccio
Midfielders
4	Mohamed Camara	(Guinea)	CM	Matam, Guinea	28 February 1997 (22)	(France) Ajaccio
5	Andreas Bouchalakis	(Greece)	MF	Heraklion, Greece	5 April 1993 (26)	(Greece) Ergotelis
6	Bibras Natkho	(Israel)	MF	Kfar Kama, Israel	18 February 1988 (31)	(Russia) CSKA Moscow
7	Kostas Fortounis	(Greece)	AM	Trikala, Greece	16 October 1992 (25)	(Germany) 1. FC Kaiserslautern
8	Thanasis Androutsos	(Greece)	AM	Marousi, Greece	6 May 1997 (20)	(Greece) Olympiacos U20
11	Lazaros Christodoulopoulos	(Greece)	RW/AM/CM	Thessaloniki, Greece	19 December 1986 (32)	(Greece) AEK Athens
12	Guilherme	(Brazil)	DM	Santo André, Brazil	5 April 1991 (28)	(Spain) Deportivo La Coruña
16	Georgios Masouras	(Greece)	LW/RW	Amfilochia, Greece	1 January 1994 (25)	(Greece) Panionios
31	Gil Dias	(Portugal)	LW	Gafanha da Nazaré, Portugal	28 September 1996 (22)	(France) Monaco
56	Daniel Podence	(Portugal)	RW/LW	Oeiras, Portugal	21 October 1995 (23)	(Portugal) Sporting CP
Forwards
9	Miguel Ángel Guerrero	(Spain)	FW	Toledo, Spain	12 July 1990 (28)	(Spain) Leganés
18	Ahmed Hassan	(Egypt)	ST	Cairo, Egypt	5 March 1993 (26)	(Portugal) Braga
29	Franco Soldano	(Argentina)	FW	Córdoba, Argentina	14 September 1994 (24)	(Argentina) Unión Santa Fe

=== Out on loan ===
Name	Nationality	Position(s)	Date of birth (Age)	To Club	Notes

== Backroom staff ==
Coaching staff
Head coach	(Portugal) Pedro Martins (footballer)
Assistant coach	(Greece) Christos Kontis
Assistant coach	(Greece) Michalis Kavalieris
Goalkeeping coach	(Greece) Panagiotis Agriogiannis
Analyst
Analyst	(Greece) Giorgos Martakos
Analyst	(Greece) Giannis Vogiatzakis
Analyst	(Greece) Iosif Loukas
Fitness coach
Fitness coach	(Greece) Giannis Ntourountos
Rehabilitation coach
Rehabilitation coach	(Greece) Dimitris Bogatsiotis
Rehabilitation coach	(Greece) Zacharias Pasxalidis
Medical team
Head doctor	(Greece) Christos Theos
Head physio	(Greece) Dimitris Skordis
Physio	(Greece) Nikos Lykouresis
Physio	(Greece) Panagiotis Sivilias
Physio	(Greece) Tasos Pliagos
Nutritionist – Physiologist	(Greece) Maria Lykomitrou
Physiotherapist	(Greece) Aristeidis Chelioudakis

== Competitions ==
=== Overview ===
Competition	Record							
Competition	G	W	D	L	GF	GA	GD	Win %
Super League Greece	30	24	3	3	71	17	+54	80.00
Greek Cup	7	4	2	1	11	6	+5	57.14
UEFA Europa League	12	6	3	3	24	12	+12	50.00
Total	49	34	8	7	106	35	+71	69.39

Updated to match played 5 May 2019
Source: Competitions

=== Super League Greece ===
==== League table ====
Pos	Team	Pld	W	D	L	GF	GA	GD	Pts	Qualification or relegation
1	PAOK (Note: PAOK were deducted 2 points by court decision.) (C)	30	26	4	0	66	14	+52	80	Qualification for the Champions League third qualifying round
2	Olympiacos	30	24	3	3	71	17	+54	75	Qualification for the Champions League second qualifying round
3	AEK Athens (Note: AEK Athens were deducted 3 points by court decision.)	30	18	6	6	50	19	+31	57	Qualification for the Europa League third qualifying round
4	Atromitos	30	15	7	8	41	28	+13	52	Qualification for the Europa League second qualifying round
5	Aris	30	15	4	11	46	33	+13	49	Qualification for the Europa League second qualifying round

Source: Super League Greece
Rules for classification: 1) Points; 2) Head-to-head points; 3) Head-to-head goal difference; 4) Goal difference; 5) Goals scored; 6) Goals against 7) Play-offs (neutral ground); 8) Draw.
(Note: Criteria 7 is only used if needed to decide champion, teams for relegation or teams for UEFA competitions).
(C) Champions

==== Results summary ====
Overall								Home						Away					
Pld	W	D	L	GF	GA	GD	Pts	W	D	L	GF	GA	GD	W	D	L	GF	GA	GD
30	24	3	3	71	17	+54	75	13	1	1	42	8	+34	11	2	2	29	9	+20

Last updated: 5 May 2019.
Source: http://superleaguegreece.net

==== Results by Matchday ====
Matchday	1	2	3	4	5	6	7	8	9	10	11	12	13	14	15	16	17	18	19	20	21	22	23	24	25	26	27	28	29	30
Ground	H	H	H	H	A	H	A	H	A	H	A	H	A	H	H	A	A	A	H	A	H	H	A	H	A	H	A	H	A	A
Result	W	W	W	W	L	D	L	W	W	D	W	W	D	W	W	W	W	W	W	L	W	W	W	W	W	W	W	W	W	W
Position	5	1	1	1	5	3	4	4	3	3	3	2	3	2	2	2	2	2	2	2	2	2	2	2	2	2	2	2	2	2

Source: http://superleaguegreece.net
A = Away; H = Home; W = Win; D = Draw; L = Loss

==== Matches ====
Win Draw Loss

26 August 2018 1	Olympiacos	1–0	Levadiakos	Piraeus
21:30	Christodoulopoulos (yellow card) 10', (goal) 62'	Summary	Omo (yellow card) 12'; Chumbinho (yellow card) 43'; Nangis (yellow card) 45+2'; Krneta (yellow card) 52'; Diogo (yellow card) 55'; Epassy (yellow card) 60'; Tsabouris (yellow card) 68'	Stadium: Karaiskakis Stadium; Attendance: 15,123; Referee: Stefanos Koubarakis

2 September 2018 2	Olympiacos	5–0	PAS Giannina	Piraeus
21:30	Elabdellaoui 34'; Fortounis 41' (pen.); Tsimikas (yellow card) 45+1'; Podence 55'; Guerrero 90'; Meriah 90+2'	Summary	Xydas (yellow card) 20'; Lila (yellow card) 67'; Tzimopoulos (yellow card) 85'; Fabry (yellow card) 90+2'	Stadium: Karaiskakis Stadium; Attendance: 19,678; Referee: Fotios Fotiadis

16 September 2018 3	Olympiacos	2–1	Asteras Tripolis	Piraeus
20:30	Camara 18'; Fortounis (yellow card) 65'; Vuković (yellow card) 77'; Natkho 90+2'	Summary	Iglesias (yellow card) 4'; Tonso 67'; Papadopoulos (yellow card) 90+1'	Stadium: Karaiskakis Stadium; Attendance: 22,800; Referee: Thanasis Tzilos

24 September 2018 4	Panionios	0–1	Olympiacos	Athens
19:30	Durmishaj (yellow card) 65'; Tsiloulis (yellow card) 74'	Summary	Elabdellaoui (yellow card) 40'; Tsimikas (yellow card) 81'; Hassan 90+2'	Stadium: Nea Smyrni Stadium; Attendance: 4,414; Referee: Manolis Skoulas

30 September 2018 5	Olympiacos	0–1	PAOK	Piraeus
20:30	Hassan (yellow card) 34'	Summary	Vuković 49' (o.g.); Cañas (yellow card) 65'; Matos (yellow card) 90'; Paschalakis (yellow card) 90+8'	Stadium: Karaiskakis Stadium; Attendance: 30,532; Referee: (Switzerland) Fedayi San

7 October 2018 6	AEK	1–1	Olympiacos	Athens
20:30	Livaja (yellow card) 46'; Morán (yellow card) 76'; Bakasetas 90+1'	Summary	Fortounis 59'; Vuković (yellow card) 65'	Stadium: Olympic Stadium; Attendance: 27,419; Referee: (Denmark) Mads Kristoffersen

21 October 2018 7	OFI	1–0	Olympiacos	Heraklion
20:30	Platellas (yellow card) 5'; Vouho 36'; Nastos (yellow card) 63'; Kyriakidis (yellow card) 84'; Mihojević (yellow card) 90+2'	Summary	Podence (yellow card) 15'; Roderick (yellow card) 53'; Guilherme (yellow card) 86'	Stadium: Theodoros Vardinogiannis Stadium; Attendance: 5,463; Referee: Athanasios Sezos

29 October 2018 8	Olympiacos	1–0	Apollon Smyrnis	Piraeus
19:30	Vuković (yellow card) 71'; Koutris (yellow card) 81'; Manos 90'	Summary	Gino (yellow card) 25'; Lukić (yellow card) 30'	Stadium: Karaiskakis Stadium; Attendance: 13,100; Referee: Praxiteles Zachariadis

4 November 2018 9	Aris	0–1	Olympiacos	Thessaloniki
19:00	Younés (yellow card) 4'; Sousa (yellow card) 40'; Diguiny (yellow card) 73'	Summary	Guilherme (yellow card) 17'; Fortounis (yellow card) 46'; Christodoulopoulos (yellow card) 51'; Hassan 67'; Elabdellaoui (yellow card) 71'	Stadium: Kleanthis Vikelidis Stadium; Attendance: 8,243; Referee: Anastasios Sidiropoulos

11 November 2018 10	Olympiacos	1–1	Panathinaikos	Piraeus
19:30	Natkho (yellow card) 51'; Cissé 90+5'	Summary	Kaçe 61' (yellow card) 90+2'; Mavromatis (yellow card) 73'; Kotsaris (yellow card) 90'; Johansson (yellow card) 90+1'	Stadium: Karaiskakis Stadium; Attendance: 31,250; Referee: (Switzerland) Adrien Jaccottet

25 November 2018 11	Atromitos	1–2	Olympiacos	Athens
19:00	Koulouris 43'; Bušuladžić (yellow card) 45+2' (yellow-red card) 57'; Madson (yellow card) 48'; Giannoulis (yellow card) 53'; Umbides (yellow card) 88'; Manousos (yellow card) 90+2'	Summary	Natkho (yellow card) 43'; Nahuel (yellow card) 45+2'; Camara 49'; Fortounis (yellow card) 61'; Vuković 90+3'	Stadium: Peristeri Stadium; Attendance: 1,673; Referee: Angelos Evangelou

3 December 2018 12	Olympiacos	2–1	Panetolikos	Piraeus
19:30	Podence 11'; Cissé (yellow card) 21'; Guerrero 25'	Summary	Chantakias (yellow card) 27' (yellow-red card) 53'; Kamara 70'	Stadium: Karaiskakis Stadium; Attendance: 15,531; Referee: Stefanos Koubarakis

9 December 2018 13	Xanthi	1–1	Olympiacos	Xanthi
15:30	K. Camara (yellow card) 27'; Vuković 54' (o.g.); Khadda (yellow card) 70'; Đuričković (yellow card) 90+3'; Chatziterzoglou (yellow card) 90+12'	Summary	Guilherme (yellow card) 49'; Podence (yellow card) 70' (yellow-red card) 78'; Vuković 76'; M. Camara (yellow card) 81'; Cissé (yellow card) 90+8'	Stadium: Xanthi FC Arena; Attendance: 1,342; Referee: Thanasis Tzilos

16 December 2018 14	Olympiacos	3–0	Lamia	Piraeus
19:30	Guerrero 32'; Fetfatzidis 46'; Elabdellaoui 51'	Summary	Bertoglio (yellow card) 39'; Blažić (yellow card) 51'; Tsoukalos (yellow card) 90+1'	Stadium: Karaiskakis Stadium; Attendance: 19,250; Referee: Aristotelis Diamantopoulos

23 December 2018 15	Olympiacos	Postponed	AEL	Piraeus
17:15				Stadium: Karaiskakis Stadium

13 January 2019 16	Levadiakos	0–2	Olympiacos	Livadeia
17:15	Omo (yellow card) 56'; Sawadogo (yellow card) 90+1'	Summary	Fortounis 7'; Eladellaoui (yellow card) 41'; Guerrero 50'; Guilherme (yellow card) 67'	Stadium: Levadia Municipal Stadium; Attendance: 2,825; Referee: Anastasios Sidiropoulos

19 January 2019 17	PAS Giannina	1–2	Olympiacos	Ioannina
17:15	Vuković 14' (o.g.); Boukouvalas (yellow card) 40'; Nikolias (yellow card) 59'; Pamlidis (yellow card) 72'; Athanasiadis (yellow card) 90+3'	Summary	Skondras 8' (o.g.); Bouchalakis (yellow card) 23'; Christodoulopoulos 37'; Koutris (yellow card) 77'; Podence (yellow card) 84'	Stadium: Zosimades Stadium; Attendance: 3,630; Referee: Ioannis Papadopoulos

27 January 2019 18	Asteras Tripolis	0–2	Olympiacos	Tripoli
19:30	Pasalidis (yellow card) 50'; Tsilianidis (yellow card) 61'	Summary	Fortounis 28', (yellow card) 58'; Christodoulopoulos 50'	Stadium: Theodoros Kolokotronis Stadium; Attendance: 5,011; Referee: Stefanos Koubarakis

30 January 2019 15	Olympiacos	4–0	AEL	Piraeus
19:30	Masouras 8'; Fortounis 16' (pen.), 45', 75'; Roderick (yellow card) 76'	Summary	Karanikas (yellow card) 14'; Jakimovski (yellow card) 15'; Golias (yellow card) 15'	Stadium: Karaiskakis Stadium; Attendance: 17,122; Referee: Georgios Kominis

2 February 2019 19	Olympiacos	4–0	Panionios	Piraeus
19:30	Natkho (yellow card) 57'; Vuković (yellow card) 65', (goal) 86'; Hassan 68'; Christodoulopoulos (yellow card) 71', (goal) 79' (pen.); Guerrero 75'	Summary	Korbos (yellow card) 37'; Camara (yellow card) 57'; Papageorgiou (yellow card) 71'; Tsiloulis (yellow card) 78'	Stadium: Karaiskakis Stadium; Attendance: 19,231; Referee: Kostantinos Kotsanis

10 February 2019 20	PAOK	3–1	Olympiacos	Thessaloniki
19:30	Vieirinha 3'; Biseswar 20'; Shakhov (yellow card) 42'; El Kaddouri (yellow card) 77'; Akpom 82'; Crespo (yellow card) 90+3'	Summary	Vuković (yellow card) 31'; Guerrero (yellow card) 41'; Torosidis (yellow card) 60'; Podence 87'; Hassan (yellow card) 90+3'	Stadium: Toumba Stadium; Attendance: 25,097; Referee: (Spain) Jesús Gil Manzano

17 February 2019 21	Olympiacos	4–1	AEK	Piraeus
19:30	Camara 50', (yellow card) 71'; Fortounis 72', 87'; Hassan 83'; Guilherme (yellow card) 89'	Summary	Ponce 3'; Oikonomou (yellow card) 40'; Galanopoulos (yellow card) 90+2'	Stadium: Karaiskakis Stadium; Attendance: 29,010; Referee: (Germany) Tobias Stieler

25 February 2019 22	Olympiacos	5–1	OFI	Piraeus
17:15	Roderick (yellow card) 4'; Podence (yellow card) 11'; Masouras 15', (yellow card) 76'; Hassan 36', 46', 60'; Fortounis 40'	Summary	Neira (yellow card) 4'; Souza (yellow card) 30'; Korovesis (yellow card) 42'; Nabi 57'; Braun (yellow card) 76'; Sakor (yellow card) 88'	Stadium: Karaiskakis Stadium; Attendance: 12,012; Referee: Vasilis Fotias

4 March 2019 23	Apollon Smyrnis	0–2	Olympiacos	Athens
19:00		Summary	Koutris (yellow card) 20'; Stathis 24' (o.g.); Masouras (yellow card) 56'; Hassan 70'	Stadium: Georgios Kamaras Stadium; Attendance: 1,046; Referee: Athanasios Sezos

10 March 2019 24	Olympiacos	4–1	Aris	Piraeus
19:30	Guilherme (yellow card) 25'; Masouras 27'; Hassan (yellow card) 31'; Podence 35', 75'; Guerrero 90'	Summary	Siopis (yellow card) 38'; Vélez (yellow card) 44'; Martínez 74'	Stadium: Karaiskakis Stadium; Attendance: 19,172; Referee: Anastasios Sidiropoulos

17 March 2019 25	Panathinaikos	0–3	Olympiacos	Athens
19:00		Summary	Elabdellaoui (yellow card) 47'; Guerrero 53'	Stadium: Olympic Stadium; Referee: (Germany) Marco Fritz
Note: The match was suspended and later awarded 0–3 by FA decision.

31 March 2019 26	Olympiacos	2–1	Atromitos	Piraeus
19:30	Guilherme 50'; Elabdellaoui (yellow card) 68'; Bouchalakis 75'	Summary	Koulouris 30'; Madson (yellow card) 52'	Stadium: Karaiskakis Stadium; Attendance: 24,670; Referee: (Finland) Mattias Gestranius

7 April 2019 27	Panetolikos	0–5	Olympiacos	Agrinio
19:00	Mazurek (yellow card) 56'; Marinakis (yellow card) 66'	Summary	Masouras 9'; Hassan 50'; Guilherme 61'; Camara 70'; Elabdellaoui 78'	Stadium: Panetolikos Stadium; Attendance: 3,429; Referee: Georgios Tzovaras

14 April 2019 28	Olympiacos	4–0	Xanthi	Piraeus
19:00	Guilherme 10', 16'; Elabdellaoui 44'; Fortounis 57'; Papadopoulos (yellow card) 80'	Summary	Casado (yellow card) 25'	Stadium: Karaiskakis Stadium; Attendance: 27,614; Referee: Stefanos Koubarakis

21 April 2019 29	Lamia	1–3	Olympiacos	Lamia
19:00	Asigba (yellow card) 60'; Jean Luc 65', (yellow card) 69'	Summary	Camara 35'; Podence (yellow card) 55'; Fortounis 68' (yellow card) 72'; Guilherme (yellow card) 70'; Hassan 85'	Stadium: Lamia Municipal Stadium; Attendance: 3,315; Referee: Georgios Kominis

5 May 2019 30	AEL	0–3	Olympiacos	Larissa
19:00	Moras (yellow card) 33'; Karanikas (yellow card) 75'	Summary	Papadopoulos (yellow card) 19'; Hassan 24'; Elabdellaoui 50'; Camara (yellow card) 82', (goal) 86'	Stadium: AEL FC Arena; Attendance: 3,101; Referee: Evangelos Manouhos

=== Greek Football Cup ===
==== Group E ====
Pos	Team	Pld	W	D	L	GF	GA	GD	Pts	Qualification	OLY	PCH	LEV	AAV
1	Olympiacos	3	3	0	0	5	1	+4	9	Round of 16		—	1–0	—
2	Panachaiki	3	2	0	1	3	3	0	6	Round of 16	0–2		2–1	—
3	Levadiakos	3	1	0	2	5	3	+2	3		—	—		4–0
4	Aris Avato	3	0	0	3	1	7	−6	0		1–2	0–1	—	

Source: epo.gr
Rules for classification: 1. Points 2. Head-to-head points 3. Head-to-head goal difference 4. Goals scored 5. Goals against 6. Play-offs (neutral ground).

27 September 2018 1	Olympiacos	1–0	Levadiakos	Piraeus
21:30	Manos 68'	Summary	Chatzilampros (yellow card) 62'	Stadium: Georgios Karaiskakis Stadium; Referee: Angelos Evangelou

1 November 2018 2	Panachaiki	0–2	Olympiacos	Patras
17:15	Loumpardeas (yellow card) 23'; Dasios (yellow card) 48'	Summary	Torosidis 39'; Guilherme (yellow card) 40'; Matías Nahuel 70'	Stadium: Kostas Davourlis Stadium; Referee: Ioannis Papadopoulos

19 December 2018 3	Aris Avato	1–2	Olympiacos	Avato
15:00	Sarigiannidis 45'; Dontsos (yellow card) 77'	Summary	Vrousai 11'; Pardo (yellow card) 35'; Androutsos 40'; Nikolaou (yellow card) 81'	Stadium: Vistonida Stadium; Referee: Evangelos Gratsanis

==== Round of 16 ====
8 January 2019 First leg	Xanthi	0–0	Olympiacos	Xanthi
17:15	Kovačević (yellow card) 16'; Khadda (yellow card) 25'; Camara (yellow card) 52'	Summary	Meriah (yellow card) 51'; Natkho (yellow card) 84'	Stadium: Xanthi FC Arena; Referee: Praxiteles Zachariadis

23 January 2019 Second leg	Olympiacos	3–1 (3–1 agg.)	Xanthi	Piraeus
19:30	Podence 29', 61'; Natkho (yellow card) 45+2'; Guilherme (yellow card) 45+2'; Koka 52'; Roderick (yellow card) 67'	Summary	Lisgaras (yellow card) 8'; Casado (yellow card) 45+2'; Brito 74' (pen.)	Stadium: Karaiskakis Stadium; Referee: Georgios Tzovaras

==== Quarter-finals ====
6 February 2019 First leg	Lamia	3–3	Olympiacos	Lamia
17:00	Tsoukalos 9', 62'; Bouchalakis 31' (o.g.); Piti (yellow card) 52'; Skondras (yellow card) 68'; Bouloulis (yellow card) 75'	Summary	Dias 12' (yellow card) 54'; Roderick (yellow card) 30'; Soldano 51'; Koka 61'; Camara (yellow card) 90'	Stadium: Lamia Municipal Stadium; Referee: Manolis Skoulas

28 February 2019 Second leg	Olympiacos	0–1 (3–4 agg.)	Lamia	Piraeus
19:30	Bouchalakis (yellow card) 39'	Summary	Joan Tomàs 52'; Pliatsikas (yellow card) 86'	Stadium: Karaiskakis Stadium; Referee: Georgios Kominis

=== UEFA Europa League ===
Win Draw Loss

==== Third qualifying round ====
9 August 2018 First leg	Olympiacos (Greece)	4–0	(Switzerland) Luzern	Piraeus, Greece
21:00	Christodoulopoulos 10', 33'; Camara (yellow card) 16'; Guerrero 36', 84'; Bouchalakis (yellow card) 61'	Summary	Schmid (yellow card) 20'; Voca (yellow card) 39'; Schneuwly (yellow card) 56'	Stadium: Georgios Karaiskakis Stadium; Attendance: 19,208; Referee: François Letexier (France)

16 August 2018 Second leg	Luzern (Switzerland)	1–3 (1–7 agg.)	(Greece) Olympiacos	Lucerne, Switzerland
19:30	Lucas (yellow card) 56'; Demhasaj 82'	Summary	Christodoulopoulos 23', 60'; Fortounis (yellow card) 32'; Guerrero 68'	Stadium: Swissporarena; Attendance: 6,258; Referee: Kirill Levnikov (Russia)

==== Play-off round ====
23 August 2018 First leg	Olympiacos (Greece)	3–1	(England) Burnley	Piraeus, Greece
20:00	Fortounis 19', 60' (pen.); Bouchalakis (yellow card) 32', (goal) 48'; Christodoulopoulos (yellow card) 44'	Summary	Wood 33' (pen.); Guðmundsson (yellow card) 45+2'; Long (yellow card) 47'; Gibson (yellow card) 47' (yellow-red card) 59'; Taylor (yellow card) 75'	Stadium: Georgios Karaiskakis Stadium; Attendance: 25,010; Referee: Slavko Vinčić (Slovenia)

30 August 2018 Second leg	Burnley (England)	1–1 (2–4 agg.)	(Greece) Olympiacos	Burnley, England
19:45	Barnes (yellow card) 50'; Westwood (yellow card) 63'; Bardsley (yellow card) 79'; Vydra 86'; Mee (yellow card) 87'	Summary	Tsimikas (yellow card) 67'; Gianniotis (yellow card) 78'; Podence 83'; Bouchalakis (yellow card) 87'	Stadium: Turf Moor; Attendance: 15,234; Referee: Viktor Kassai (Hungary)

==== Group stage ====
Pos	Team	Pld	W	D	L	GF	GA	GD	Pts	Qualification	BET	OLY	MIL	DUD
1	(Spain) Real Betis	6	3	3	0	7	2	+5	12	Advance to knockout phase	—	1–0	1–1	3–0
2	(Greece) Olympiacos	6	3	1	2	11	6	+5	10 (Note: Goal difference in all group matches: Olympiacos +5, Milan +3.)	Advance to knockout phase	0–0	—	3–1	5–1
3	(Italy) Milan	6	3	1	2	12	9	+3	10		1–2	3–1	—	5–2
4	(Luxembourg) F91 Dudelange	6	0	1	5	3	16	−13	1		0–0	0–2	0–1	—

Source: UEFA
Notes:

20 September 2018 1	Olympiacos (Greece)	0–0	(Spain) Real Betis	Piraeus, Greece
22:00	Bouchalakis (yellow card) 21'; Tsimikas (yellow card) 32' (yellow-red card) 73'	Summary	Canales (yellow card) 75'; Inui (yellow card) 84'	Stadium: Georgios Karaiskakis Stadium; Attendance: 28,650; Referee: Daniel Stefański (Poland)

4 October 2018 2	Milan (Italy)	3–1	(Greece) Olympiacos	Milan, Italy
18:55	Çalhanoğlu (yellow card) 56'; Cutrone 70', 79'; Higuaín 76'	Summary	Guerrero 14'	Stadium: San Siro; Attendance: 22,294; Referee: Bobby Madden (Scotland)

25 October 2018 3	F91 Dudelange (Luxembourg)	0–2	(Greece) Olympiacos	Luxembourg City, Luxembourg
18:55	Couturier (yellow card) 56'	Summary	Camara (yellow card) 35'; Torosidis 66'; Christodoulopoulos (yellow card) 73'; Jordanov 81' (o.g.)	Stadium: Stade Josy Barthel; Attendance: 7,500; Referee: Hüseyin Göçek (Turkey)

8 November 2018 4	Olympiacos (Greece)	5–1	(Luxembourg) F91 Dudelange	Piraeus, Greece
22:00	Torosidis 6', (yellow card) 48'; Fortounis 15', 36'; Christodoulopoulos 26'; Hassan 70'	Summary	Turpel (yellow card) 27'; Schnell (yellow card) 48'; Sinani 69'	Stadium: Georgios Karaiskakis Stadium; Attendance: 24,032; Referee: Petr Ardeleanu (Czech Republic)

29 November 2018 5	Real Betis (Spain)	1–0	(Greece) Olympiacos	Seville, Spain
18:55	Bartra (yellow card) 29'; Canales 39', (yellow card) 87'; Mandi (yellow card) 73'; Sanabria (yellow card) 75'; Lo Celso (yellow card) 87'	Summary	Cissé (yellow card) 18'; Fortounis (yellow card) 19'; Nahuel (yellow card) 24'; Bouchalakis (yellow card) 25'; Elabdellaoui (yellow card) 82'	Stadium: Estadio Benito Villamarín; Attendance: 37,722; Referee: Sergei Karasev (Russia)

13 December 2018 6	Olympiacos (Greece)	3–1	(Italy) Milan	Piraeus, Greece
22:00	Koutris (yellow card) 41'; Cissé (yellow card) 45', (goal) 60'; Zapata 70' (o.g.); Camara (yellow card) 73'; Fortounis 81' (pen.); Guerrero (yellow card) 90'	Summary	Çalhanoğlu (yellow card) 13'; Bakayoko (yellow card) 43'; Reina (yellow card) 54'; Zapata 72'; Abate (yellow card) 81'	Stadium: Georgios Karaiskakis Stadium; Attendance: 31,010; Referee: Benoît Bastien (France)

==== Knockout phase ====
===== Round of 32 =====
14 February 2019 First leg	Olympiacos (Greece)	2–2	(Ukraine) Dynamo Kyiv	Piraeus, Greece
18:55	Hassan 9'; Camara (yellow card) 32'; Dias 40'; Podence (yellow card) 58'	Summary	Buyalskyi 29'; Verbič (yellow card) 74', (goal) 89'; Kędziora (yellow card) 90+2'	Stadium: Georgios Karaiskakis Stadium; Attendance: 31,020; Referee: Craig Pawson (England)

21 February 2019 Second leg	Dynamo Kyiv (Ukraine)	1–0 (3–2 agg.)	(Greece) Olympiacos	Kyiv, Ukraine
21:00	Verbič (yellow card) 22'; Kędziora (yellow card) 24'; Sol 32'; Shepelyev (yellow card) 79'	Summary	Cissé (yellow card) 22'; Podence (yellow card) 45'; Guerrero (yellow card) 66'; Torosidis (yellow card) 84'	Stadium: NSC Olimpiyskiy Stadium; Referee: Ivan Kružliak (Slovakia)

== Squad statistics ==
=== Appearances ===
Last updated on 14 April 2019.

No.	Pos	Nat	Player	Total		Super League Greece		Greek Cup		Europa League	
No.	Pos	Nat	Player	Apps	Goals	Apps	Goals	Apps	Goals	Apps	Goals
Goalkeepers
1	GK	(Greece) GRE	Lefteris Choutesiotis	2	0	0	0	2	0	0	0
32	GK	(Russia) RUS	Yuri Lodygin	1	0	0	0	1	0	0	0
93	GK	(Portugal) POR	José Sá	30	0	21	0	2	0	7	0
Defenders
14	DF	(Norway) NOR	Omar Elabdellaoui	30	4	22	4	0	0	7+1	0
20	DF	(Tunisia) TUN	Yassine Meriah	24	1	15+1	1	4	0	3+1	0
21	DF	(Greece) GRE	Kostas Tsimikas	26	0	11+2	0	4	0	9	0
23	DF	(Greece) GRE	Leonardo Koutris	24	0	17	0	3+1	0	3	0
25	DF	(Portugal) POR	Roderick Miranda	20	0	7+1	0	6	0	6	0
26	DF	(Serbia) SRB	Jagoš Vuković	28	3	18	3	1	0	9	0
34	DF	(Greece) GRE	Avraam Papadopoulos	1	0	0+1	0	0	0	0	0
35	DF	(Greece) GRE	Vasilis Torosidis	24	3	7+5	0	3	1	4+5	2
64	DF	(Greece) GRE	Apostolos Martinis	1	0	0	0	1	0	0	0
66	DF	(Senegal) SEN	Pape Abou Cissé	27	2	17	1	2	0	7+1	1
Midfielders
4	MF	(Guinea) GUI	Mohamed Camara	34	4	16+6	4	2	0	10	0
5	MF	(Greece) GRE	Andreas Bouchalakis	30	2	15+3	1	2+1	0	8+1	1
6	MF	(Israel) ISR	Bibras Natkho	30	1	6+13	1	2+1	0	2+6	0
7	MF	(Greece) GRE	Kostas Fortounis	41	16	25+1	11	2+1	0	11+1	5
8	MF	(Greece) GRE	Thanasis Androutsos	7	1	0+3	0	4	1	0	0
11	MF	(Greece) GRE	Lazaros Christodoulopoulos	26	9	12+5	4	0+1	0	5+3	5
12	MF	(Brazil) BRA	Guilherme	32	4	21+1	4	5	0	5	0
16	MF	(Greece) GRE	Georgios Masouras	15	4	7+2	4	3+1	0	0+2	0
31	MF	(Portugal) POR	Gil Dias	9	2	2+4	0	1	1	0+2	1
56	MF	(Portugal) POR	Daniel Podence	40	8	25+1	5	1+1	2	11+1	1
57	MF	(Greece) GRE	Georgios Xenitidis	1	0	0	0	1	0	0	0
58	MF	(Greece) GRE	Nikos Peios	1	0	0	0	0+1	0	0	0
67	MF	(Greece) GRE	Georgios Neofytidis	1	0	0	0	0+1	0	0	0
Forwards
9	FW	(Spain) ESP	Miguel Ángel Guerrero	34	11	15+7	7	2+1	0	7+2	4
18	FW	(Egypt) EGY	Ahmed Hassan	30	13	11+9	9	2+3	2	3+2	2
29	FW	(Argentina) ARG	Franco Soldano	7	1	1+3	0	2+1	1	0	0
51	FW	(Greece) GRE	Alexandros Voilis	3	0	0	0	1+2	0	0	0
63	FW	(Greece) GRE	Georgios Marinos	1	0	0	0	0+1	0	0	0
Players who have made an appearance or had a squad number this season but have been loaned out or transferred
10	MF	(Greece) GRE	Giannis Fetfatzidis	18	1	3+6	1	1+1	0	3+4	0
17	MF	(Spain) ESP	Nahuel	11	1	4	0	3	1	4	0
17	FW	(Iran) IRI	Karim Ansarifard	2	0	0	0	0	0	0+2	0
19	MF	(Greece) GRE	Marios Vrousai	6	1	0+1	0	3	1	0+2	0
22	GK	(Greece) GRE	Andreas Gianniotis	13	0	7	0	1	0	5	0
27	MF	(Greece) GRE	Georgios Masouras	3	0	0	0	2+1	0	0	0
33	FW	(Greece) GRE	Dimitrios Manos	9	2	1+5	1	3	1	0	0
42	MF	(Ivory Coast) CIV	Yaya Touré	5	0	1+1	0	1	0	1+1	0
43	DF	(Greece) GRE	Dimitris Nikolaou	1	0	0	0	1	0	0	0
90	FW	(Colombia) COL	Felipe Pardo	3	0	1	0	1+1	0	0	0

== Individual Awards ==
Name	Pos.	Award
(Greece) Kostas Fortounis	Attacking Midfielder	Super League Greece Player of the Season; Super League Greece Greek Footballer of the Season; Super League Greece Team of the Season
(Greece) Georgios Masouras	Winger	Super League Greece Team of the Season
(Brazil) Guilherme	Defensive Midfielder	Super League Greece Team of the Season
(Portugal) Daniel Podence	Winger	Super League Greece Team of the Season
(Norway) Omar Elabdellaoui	Right-back	Super League Greece Team of the Season
