= Gisbert Zarambaud =

Central African footballer

Personal information
- Full name: Gisbert-Tristan Zarambaud
- Date of birth: 8 July 1997 (age 29)
- Place of birth: Bangui, Central African Republic
- Height: 1.73 m (5 ft 8 in)
- Position: Left-back

Team information
- Current team: Vesoul
- Number: 11

Youth career
- Orléans

Senior career*
Years	Team	Apps	(Gls)
2019–2020	Roche Novillars	18	(0)
2020–2022	Jura Sud	8	(0)
2022–2023	Pontarlier	23	(1)
2023–	Vesoul	5	(1)

International career
2021–	Central African Republic	1	(0)
- * Club domestic league appearances and goals as of 17:32, 9 October 2023 (UTC)

Gisbert-Tristan Zarambaud (born 8 July 1997) is a Central African professional footballer who plays as a left-back for FC Vesoul and the Central African Republic national team.

== Club career ==
A youth product of Orléans, Zarambaud began his senior career with Roche Novillars in the Championnat National 3. On 13 August 2020, he joined Jura Sud in the Championnat National 2. He left the club in 2022.

== International career ==
Following a call-up, Zarambaud made his debut with the Central African Republic national team in a 1–1 2022 FIFA World Cup qualification tie with Cape Verde on 1 September 2021.

== Personal life ==
Coming from a family of sportsmen who have represented Central African football and basketball, Zarambaud is the grandson of Central African politician Théophile Sonny Colé, 1974 FIBA Africa Championship champion Sonny Pokomandji, and of famous International Criminal Court lawyer Assingambi Zarambaud.
