= José Diego =

José Diego may refer to:

- Diego José de Cádiz (1743–1801), a Spanish Capuchin friar and preacher from the Andalusia region.
- José de Diego (1866–1918), a Puerto Rican statesman, journalist, poet, lawyer, and advocate for independence.
- José Tormos Diego (1890–1977), a Puerto Rican politician who served as mayor of Ponce.
- José Diego (footballer), (born 1954), a Spanish former footballer who played as a midfielder for Real Sociedad and the Spain national team.
- Jose Diego, Spanish astrophysicist and cosmologist

== See also ==
- Diego José, Argentine professional footballer.
- Diego José Abad, Jesuit poet and translator in New Spain and Italy.
