= Lycée Barthélémy Boganda de Bangui =

Lycée Barthélemy Boganda
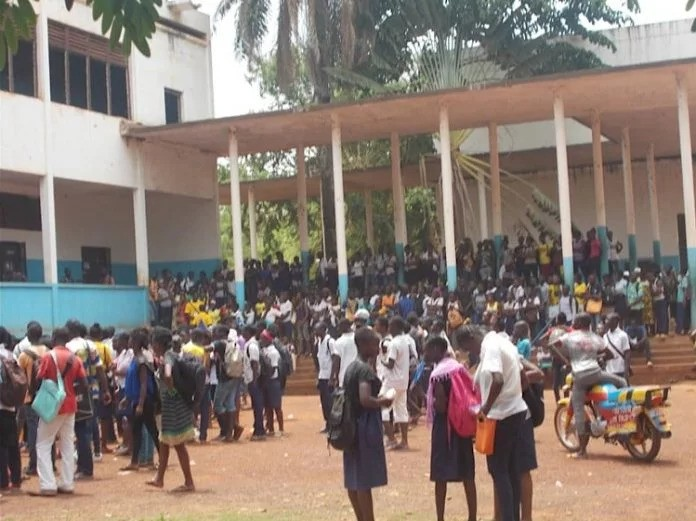
- Lycée Barthélemy Boganda in 2019

Location
- Avenue de l'indépendance 2361; Bangui; Central African Republic
- Coordinates: 4.395572°N 18.560139°E

Information
- Former name: Collège Emile Gentil (1954–1968)
- Type: Public
- Established: 23 January 1954; 72 years ago
- Principal: Annie Yindoua
- Staff: 185+
- Teaching staff: 155
- Enrollment: 12,000+

Lycée Barthélemy Boganda is a public high school situated in Bangui. The school is named after Barthélemy Boganda.

== History ==
=== Founding and early history ===
The school's construction began on 17 May 1952 and inaugurated on 23 January 1954 by Pierre Chauvet with the name Collège Emile Gentil. It was the first high school in what was then the French colony of Ubangi-Shari. The school, which served the children of elites, educated many of the Central African Republic's post-independence political leaders. The school was open to both European and African students, the latter of whom received scholarships to study and board at the school.

In January–February 1956, African students at Collège Emile Gentil went on strike, citing racial discrimination. The immediate cause of the strike was the suspension of an African student for moving to sit next to a European student. For this violation, the student was expelled for eight days by a school disciplinary board. In response, at lunchtime on 27 January 1956, African students left the school refectory without eating and walked into town, first approaching the home of Barthélemy Boganda to express their grievances. Finding that Boganda was not at home, they went to home of Antoine Darlan, whose nephew Pascal Darlan was a student at the school and a leader of the demonstrators. The students complained of poor treatment and separation from the European students. On 30 January, only about 30 students returned to their classes, and just 19 the following day. The strike lasted until Thursday, 2 February, followed by a demonstration in front of the school the following Monday.

The colonial government of French Equatorial Africa granted that the student's expulsion may have been "disproportionate", but dismissed most of the demonstrators' grievances as "unfounded". One exception was a school policy in which African and European students were kept in separate areas during study periods between classes or in the absence of a teacher, which the colonial authorities acknowledged was "questionable". This system was changed in response to the strike.

In 1968, the school was renamed Lycée Barthélemy Boganda in honor of Barthélemy Boganda, the first premier of the autonomous Central African Republic.

=== Recent history ===
Ecobank Centrafrique donated computers and laboratory equipment worth $11 million to Lycée Barthélemy Boganda on 6 February 2009. The school underwent renovation in 2011, resulting in new classrooms and a rehabilitated sanitary block.

A quarrel between Lycée Barthélemy Boganda and Lycée Gobongo students outside the school ensued on 1 February 2013, causing traffic disruption on the road in front of the school. The squabble stemmed from some of the Boganda students accusing Gobongo students of not cleaning the courtyard, and some of Boganda's buildings were leased to Gobongo. The gendarmerie and police arrived at the location and disbursed the fight by firing warning shots and throwing tear gas, leading some students to get injured due to the trampling from the other pupils who fled due to the gunfire. The fight was soon resolved.

Due to the Seleka takeover of Bangui, Lycée Barthélemy Boganda was temporarily closed and the militias occupied the school. Class learning resumed on 6 May 2013, although fewer students were present. Upon the fall of Seleka Government, an unknown group looted and vandalized the school. In response to this situation, the school principal asked Anti-balaka to guard the school, and they promised to do so.

The 3rd-grade students organized a demonstration demanding clarification on the list of candidates for the baccalaureate certificate and the removal of the principal, Martin Pounouwaka. Soon, the demonstration ended, and the principal released the candidate lists.

In 2018, there was a call to rehabilitate Lycée Barthélemy Boganda as the school was in poor condition which might harm the students and teachers.

In April 2019, Lycée Barthélemy Boganda was chosen as the pilot project for Russian language teaching.

A group of students held a strike by blocking the Independence Avenue road to express their discontent with the teacher shortage in their school on 8 February 2022.

The school's basketball court was built with funds from France and was inaugurated on 17 December 2021. BGFIBank Group rehabilitated the laboratory and donated the lab's equipment to the school on 21 September 2023 during the ceremony.

In October 2023, the school was in a dire situation. The school's walls were cracked, whereas the desks, benches, and blackboards were broken. Furthermore, the school classes were dirty, cobwebs were ubiquitous, and windows and doors were lost. Touadéra announced the rehabilitation of the school during his visit to the school on 3 November 2023. In January 2024, the school was renovated.

On 25 June 2025, an explosion of an electrical transformer near the school caused a stampede that killed 29 and injured around 260 students.

== Enrollment ==
Lycée Barthélemy Boganda has approximately 12,000 students and 155 teachers.

== Reputation ==
The school is renowned for its excellence and for producing alumni who become national leaders.

== Notable people ==
=== Alumni ===
- Faustin-Archange Touadéra, current president of Central African Republic
- Bruno Dacko, Minister of Tourism (2003–2005)
- Jean-Jacques Démafouth, Minister of Defense (1999–2001) and APRD rebel leader
- Fidèle Gouandjika, Minister of Rural Development and Agriculture (2009–2013) and Minister of Posts and Telecommunications (2005–2009)
- Enoch Derant Lakoué, Prime Minister of the Central African Republic (1993); studied at the school from 1960–1962
- Jean-Pierre Lebouder, Prime Minister of Central African Republic (1980–1981)
- Sonny M'Pokomandji, basketball player and politician, Minister of Equipment and Transport (2003–2005); completed the 12th grade at the school
- Jean-Luc Mandaba, Prime Minister of Central African Republic (1993–1995)
- Patrice-Edouard Ngaïssona, Minister of Sport (2003–2013) and Anti-balaka leader
- André Nzapayeké, acting Prime Minister of Central African Republic (2014)
- Louis Papeniah, member of Parliament and Minister of Transport and Civil Aviation (c.1993)
- Faustin-Archange Touadéra, President of the Central African Republic (2016–present)
- Isaac Zokoué, theologian

== Bibliography ==
- Bradshaw, Richard; Rius, Juan Fandos (2016). Historical Dictionary of the Central African Republic (Historical Dictionaries of Africa). Lanham: Rowman & Littlefield.
