= USTC =

USTC may mean:

- Universal Short Title Catalogue
- University of Science and Technology of China
- Union of Central African Workers (Union Syndicale des Travailleurs de Centrafrique)
- University of Science & Technology Chittagong
- United Shipping & Trading Company, a conglomerate in shipping and other fields
- United Sports Training Center
- United State of Travancore and Cochin
- United States Tax Court
- United States Training Center
