= FC Vesoul =

French football club

Vesoul
- Full name: Football Club de Vesoul
- Nickname: FCV
- Founded: 1917
- Ground: Stade René Hologne
- Capacity: 6,000
- Chairman: Pierre-Antoine Gorcy
- Manager: Didier Clerval
- League: National 2
- 2025–26: Régional 1 Bourgogne-Franche-Comté Group B, 1st of 12 (promoted)
Home colours	Away colours	Third colours

Football Club de Vesoul is a French association football team founded in 1917. They are based in Vesoul, France and currently play in the Championnat National 2, the fifth tier in French football. They play at the Stade René Hologne in Vesoul, which has a capacity of 6,000.

== History ==
Founded in 1917 as Racing Club Vésulien, the club took the name US Vesoul. In 1950 the club merged with ASPTT Vesoul, becoming ASPTT/US Vesoul. Another merger in 1973 with an existing club named FC Vesoul saw the name USFC Vesoul taken.

In 1994 the club were promoted to the fifth tier of the French football pyramid for the first time, followed by further promotion to the fourth tier in 2001. In 2002 the club took the new name Vesoul Haute Saône Football. Following several promotions and relegations between the fourth and fifth tiers, the club suffered a bankruptcy event in 2014 and was automatically relegated back to the regional league. It took today's name, Football Club de Vesoul at that point.

In 2023, the club regained the national level, with promotion to Championnat National 3.

== Notable players ==
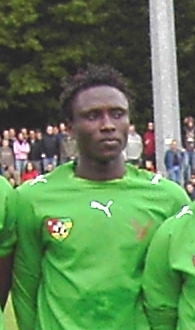
Affo Erassa

- Cédric Si Mohamed (one cap for the Algeria national team)
- Jacques Olivier Etonde-Ebelle (two caps for the Cameroon national team)
- Pape Mamadou Diouf (four caps for the Senegal national team)
- Affo Erassa (four caps for the Togo national team)
- (France) Mickaël Ravaux
- (France) Christophe Taine
- (Central African Republic) Gisbert Zarambaud
- (France) Sofiane Khadda
- (Senegal) Elhadji Ousseynou Ndoye
- (Gabon) Emmanuel Ovono
- (France) Alassane N'Diaye
- (Argentina) Diego José
