= Fidèle Gouandjika =

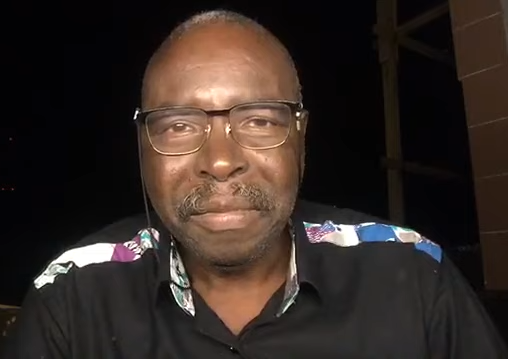
- Fidèle Gouandjika in 2020

Minister of Rural Development and Agriculture
- In office 19 January 2009 – 3 February 2013
- President: François Bozizé
- Prime Minister: Faustin-Archange Touadéra
- Preceded by: David Banzokou
- Succeeded by: Dorothée Aimée Malenzapa

Minister of Posts and Telecommunications and New Technology
- In office 19 June 2005 – 19 January 2009
- President: François Bozizé
- Prime Minister: Élie Doté
- Preceded by: Idriss Salao
- Succeeded by: Thierry Savonaroye Maléyombo

Personal details
- Born: 20 February 1955 Mbaiki, Ubangi-Shari (now the present-day Central African Republic)
- Party: KNK (former)
- Children: 7
- Education: Gheorghe Asachi Technical University of Iași
- Occupation: Businessman; Politician; Teacher

Fidèle Gouandjika (born 20 February 1955), nicknamed The billionaire of Boy-Rabe, is a wealthy Central African businessman and politician. He held two different ministerial positions under the Bozize government. Gouandjika was the first person who introduced Qwan Ki Do in Romania by establishing the Qwan Ki Do club in Iași in 1980.

== Early life and education ==
Fidèle Gouandjika was born on 20 February 1955 in Mbaiki. He is the son of François Ngouandjika, a soldier who served for Senegalese Tirailleurs unit during the World War II. In the unknown year, Gouandjika moved to Bangui and was raised in the Boy-Rabe neighborhood. He enrolled in primary education at Boy-Rabe and completed it in 1968. He then continued high school in Lycée des Martyrs in 1968 and finished it in 1974. Later he enrolled at Lycée Barthélémy Boganda and graduated in 1977. When Bokassa proclaimed himself emperor, Gouandjika opposed it. His opposition to Bokassa led him to be jailed for three months.

Gouandjika then moved to Romania in 1977 and continued his higher education at the Faculty of Electrical Engineering of Gheorghe Asachi Technical University of Iași and graduated in 1983. One year later, he went back to Central African Republic.

== Career ==
=== Early career ===
He taught karate and Qwan Ki Do in Romania. As a karate and qwan ki do athlete, he participated in the 1981 European martial arts championship representing Romania and won the silver medal in a long stick fight. Gouandjika competed in the 1982 European martial arts championship, represented the Romania team and won a silver medal.

In the Central African Republic, he began his career as a physics and computer sciences teacher at several high schools in Bangui from 1984 to 1987. He then worked as Head of the Studies and Planning Department at Office Centrafricain des Postes et Télécommunications (DGT) from 1988 to 1990. While working at DGT, he also became a professor of physics at the University of Bangui from 1989 to 1990. Subsequently, he worked at Socatel from 1990 to 2005. In the beginning, he was the Head of the IT Division position from 1990 to 1997. Later he was promoted to director of Socatel. Meanwhile, he also became the Telecommunications and New Technologies advisor at High Council for Communication from 1998 to 1999. He announced his retirement as the Director of Socatel in 2004 to support Francois Bozize on 2005 election. However, he later encouraged people to vote for André Massi and Nicolas Tiangaye on 28 December 2004.

=== Political career ===
Gouandjika ran for the 1999 Central African presidential election as an independent candidate who represented the youth and received 9,431 votes, placing him as the second lowest of all candidates.

In 2005, Dotte appointed Gouandjika as a Minister of Posts and Telecommunications and New Technology. As a Posts and Telecommunications and New Technology minister, he liberalized Socatel by signing a contract with Telesoft International in 2007. In addition, he signed a 7 billion CFA francs contract with ZTE for government digitalization and a 6 million CFA francs establishment and operation agreement with Orange. In 2011, Karim Meckassoua conducted an audit of Minister of Posts and Telecommunications and New Technology under his two predecessors over mismanagement and accused Thierry Savonaroye Maléyombo and Gouandjika of money embezzlement. This accusation led his passport to be confiscated and him lost position as the government spokesman. Later, he received his passport.

Touadera appointed Gouandjika as a minister of agriculture and development on 19 January 2009. He held this position for four years. While serving as agriculture minister, he was appointed government spokesman on 20 April 2010. As a minister, he was known for corrupting the budget allocated to peasant farmers.

When Seleka toppled Bozize in 2013, Gouandjika fled to Romania and later returned to CAR on 9 September 2014. In 2015, he ran for election and received 15,356 votes. He later resigned from KNK and supported Touadéra. Currently, he is a special minister and adviser to President Touadéra.

== Controversy ==
=== Sexism ===
On 15 March 2021, during a live session on his personal Facebook account, he stipulated that if Russians requested Central African women for sexual desire, we would give them. His remark stunned the public and the country's women's organizations condemned his statement that objectified women. He later apologized for his offensive remark.

=== Call for Genocide ===
During the Facebook live session on 2 November, Gouandjika issued a genocide threat that if Touadera was ousted from the position, there would be a genocide not only targeting Central Africans but also MINUSCA and embassy staff. The Civil society organizations condemned Gouandjika's threat and called for his resignation as special advisor.

== Personal life ==
Gouandjika belongs to Mandja and is married to a Romanian woman from Bacău. He speaks fluent Sango, French, and Romanian and can understand English and Spanish. In 1994, he was elected as president of the Central African Federation of Karate and Martial Arts.
