= Affo =

Affo is both a surname and a given name. Notable people with the name include:

- Frédéric Affo (1943–2011), Beninese politician
- Ireneo Affò (1741–1797), Italian historian
- Affo Erassa (born 1983), Togolese footballer
