= Jean Izamo =

Central African military leader

Jean-Henri Izamo (died January 1966) was the head of the gendarmerie of the Central African Republic. He was killed following the Saint-Sylvestre coup d'état.

== Saint-Sylvestre coup d'état ==
Central African Republic President David Dacko, Jean-Bédel Bokassa's cousin, took over the country in 1960, and Bokassa, a military officer in the French army, joined the CAR army in 1962. By 1965, the country was in turmoil—plagued by corruption and slow economic growth, while its borders were breached by rebels from neighboring countries. Dacko obtained financial aid from the communist People's Republic of China, but despite this support, the country's problems persisted. Bokassa made plans to take over the government; Dacko became aware of this, and countered by forming the gendarmerie headed by Izamo of the Sara ethnic group, who quickly became Dacko's closest adviser.

Tensions between Dacko and Bokassa increased. In December, Dacko approved a budget increase for Izamo's gendarmerie, but rejected the budget proposal for Bokassa's army. At this point, Bokassa told friends he was annoyed by Dacko's treatment and was "going for a coup d'état". Dacko planned to replace Bokassa with Izamo as his personal military adviser, and wanted to promote army officers loyal to the government, while demoting Bokassa and his close associates. Bokassa realized he had to act against Dacko quickly, and worried that his 500-man army would be no match for the gendarmerie and the presidential guard. He was also concerned the French would intervene to aid Dacko, as had occurred after the 23 February 1964 coup d'état in Gabon against President Léon M'ba. After receiving word of the coup from the country's military chief of staff, Omar Bongo, officials in Paris sent paratroopers to Gabon in a matter of hours and M'ba was quickly restored to power.

Bokassa found substantive support from his co-conspirator, Captain Alexandre Banza, who was commander of the Camp Kassaï military base in northeast Bangui, and, like Bokassa, had served in the French army in posts around the world. Banza was an intelligent, ambitious and capable man who played a major role in planning the coup. By December, many people began to anticipate the potential turmoil that would result. Dacko's personal advisers alerted him that Bokassa "showed signs of mental instability" and needed to be arrested before he sought to bring down the government, but Dacko failed to heed these warnings.

=== Execution of the coup ===
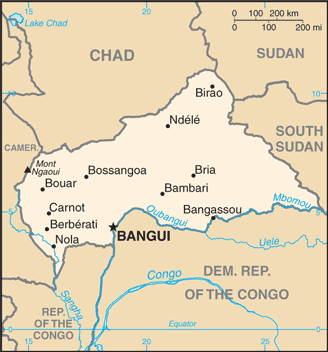
Map of the Central African Republic

Early in the evening of 31 December 1965, Dacko left the Palais de la Renaissance to visit one of his ministers' plantations southwest of the capital. At 22:30, Captain Banza gave orders to his officers to begin the coup: one of his captains was to subdue the security guard in the presidential palace, while the other was to take control of Radio-Bangui to prevent communication between Dacko and his followers. Bokassa called Izamo at his headquarters, asking him to come to Camp de Roux to sign some papers that needed his immediate attention. Izamo, who was at a New Year's Eve celebration with friends, reluctantly agreed and traveled in his wife's car to the camp. Upon arrival, he was confronted by Banza and Bokassa, who informed him of the coup in progress. When asked if he would support the coup, Izamo said no, leading Bokassa and Banza to overpower him and hold him in a cellar.

At midnight on 1 January 1966, Bokassa and Banza organized their troops and told them of their plan to take over the government. Bokassa claimed that Dacko had resigned from the presidency and given the position to Izamo, then told the soldiers that the gendarmerie would take over the CAR army, which had to act now to keep its position. He then asked the soldiers if they would support his course of action; the men who refused were locked up. At 00:30, Banza, Bokassa and their supporters left Camp de Roux to take over the capital. They encountered little resistance and were able to take Bangui. Bokassa and Banza then rushed to the Palais de la Renaissance, where they tried to arrest Dacko, who was nowhere to be found. Bokassa began to panic, as he believed the president had been warned of the coup in advance, and immediately ordered his soldiers to search for Dacko in the countryside until he was found.

Dacko was not aware of the events taking place in the capital. After leaving his minister's plantation near midnight, he headed to Simon Samba's house to ask the Aka Pgymy leader to conduct a year-end ritual. After an hour at Samba's house, he was informed of the coup in Bangui. Dacko was arrested by soldiers patrolling Pétévo Junction, on the western border of the capital. He was taken back to the presidential palace, where Bokassa hugged the president and told him, "I tried to warn you—but now it's too late". President Dacko was taken to Ngaragba Prison in east Bangui at around 02:00. In a move that he thought would boost his popularity in the country, Bokassa ordered prison director Otto Sacher to release all prisoners in the jail. Bokassa then took Dacko to Camp Kassaï at 03:20, where the president was forced by Banza to resign from office. Banza wanted to kill Dacko, but Bokassa would not allow it, believing that Dacko had not yet outlived his usefulness. Later, Bokassa's officers announced on Radio-Bangui that the Dacko government had been toppled and Bokassa had taken over control.

== Death ==
Bokassa often claimed that he seized power to prevent Izamo from doing the same. For this reason, along with director of the Presidential security service Prosper Mounoumbaye, Bokassa considered Izamo a particularly dangerous individual and "did not rest until they were eliminated". Attempting to escape, he was taken out of his cellar, moved to Camp de Roux, and then to Ngaragba Prison at roughly 10 January. At the end of January, Izamo died from mistreatment and neglect.
