= .cf =

Top-level Internet domain for the Central African Republic

- Introduced: 24 April 1996
- TLD type: Country code top-level domain
- Status: No new registries are allowed
- Registry: Central African Society of Telecommunications (SOCATEL)
- Sponsor: Central African Society of Telecommunications (SOCATEL)
- Intended use: Entities connected with Central African Republic
- Actual use: Gets a relatively small amount of use, mostly outside the Central African Republic
- Registration restrictions: Yes, for free domains only
- Structure: Registrations are directly at second level
- Documents: Registration Agreement (free domains); Registration Agreement (paid domains)
- Dispute policies: UDRP (paid domains only)
- DNSSEC: No
- Registry website: www.dot.cf

.cf is the Internet country code top-level domain (ccTLD) for the Central African Republic. It is administered by the Central African Society of Telecommunications.

Dot CF, also known as Dot CrossFire, is an initiative of the Societe Centrafricaine de Telecommunications (SOCATEL, headquartered in Bangui) in partnership with Freenom (previously known as Freedom Registry).

The domain was made available for registration free of charge on Freenom's website, regardless of whether the individual who registers the domain has any connection with the Central African Republic. Exceptions included "high value" domain names, which include trademark domain names for most Fortune 500 companies, and common dictionary terms. Potentially valuable domains which are fewer than 4 characters were also marked "High Value". The same applied to other domains offered via Freenom, such as .tk and .ml.

The .cf registry allowed the creation of emoji domain names.

Following Freenom's lawsuit with Meta and its settlement in 2024, it was unclear who would take up registration of the domain, as Freenom announced it would be exiting the domain business. The Central African Republic now owns the domain, and has closed off any further registries for the domain.
