= Mickaël Ravaux =

French footballer (born 1979)

Personal information
- Full name: Mickaël Ravaux
- Date of birth: January 2, 1979 (age 47)
- Place of birth: Belfort, France
- Height: 1.81 m (5 ft 11 1/2 in)
- Position: Defender

Team information
- Current team: Vesoul Haute-Saône
- Number: 4

Youth career
- 1994–1997: Sochaux

Senior career*
| Years | Team | Apps | (Gls) |
| 1997–1999 | Sochaux | 36 | (0) |
| 2000 | Le Mans | 3 | (0) |
| 2000–2003 | Grenoble | 102 | (1) |
| 2003–2005 | Vesoul Haute-Saône | 29 | (0) |
| 2005–2007 | SO Romorantin | 77 | (0) |
| 2007–2008 | AS Cannes | 35 | (0) |
| 2008–2009 | Bergerac Foot | 14 | (0) |
| 2009–2010 | CS Louhans-Cuiseaux | 10 | (0) |
| 2010–2011 | RC Belfort 80 | | |
| 2011– | Vesoul Haute-Saône | | |

International career
| 1999–2000 | France U-21 | 16 | (0) |
- * Club domestic league appearances and goals as of 20:25, 20 November 2009 (UTC)

Mickaël Ravaux (born January 2, 1979) is a French professional football player, who currently plays for Vesoul Haute-Saône.

== Career ==
He played on the professional level in Ligue 1 for FC Sochaux-Montbéliard and in Ligue 2 for FC Sochaux-Montbéliard, Le Mans Union Club 72 and Grenoble Foot 38.
