= Cécile Guéret =

Mayor of Bangui
- In office 18 February 2000 – 22 May 2003
- Preceded by: Joseph Bendounga
- Succeeded by: Jean-Barkès Gombé-Ketté

Personal details
- Born: 1954 (age 71–72)

Cécile Guéret-Séreguet (born 1954) is an activist and politician in the Central African Republic. She served as mayor of Bangui from 2000 to 2003.

A trade unionist and women's rights advocate, she was previously president of both the General Union of Central African Workers and the feminist organization OFCA.

== Career ==
=== Labor and feminist activism ===
Guéret joined the Central African labor movement in 1979 and became a prominent leader.

As a member of the national bureau of the Union of Central African Workers (USTC), she was arrested and held without trial on July 9, 1991, for her union activity under the regime of President André Kolingba. She became president of the General Union of Central African Workers (UGTC) in 2000. Guéret's labor activism included traveling throughout the country to encourage women workers to organize.

Her feminist activism led to her being named president l’Organisation des Femmes de Centrafrique (OFCA) in 2015. That same year, she was appointed to the preparatory commission of the Bangui National Forum by President Catherine Samba-Panza.

=== Mayor of Bangui ===
Guéret was named mayor of Bangui, the capital of the Central African Republic, by President Ange-Félix Patassé in February 2000, joining only a handful of women who had reached that level of office in the country. She served as mayor for three years, until 2003, when President François Bozizé took office and appointed his nephew Jean-Barkès Gombé-Ketté in her place. Guéret was imprisoned for a few months but eventually released.
