= 2025 Bangui school stampede =

Crowd crush incident

- Date: 25 June 2025
- Location: Barthelemy Boganda High School, Bangui, Central African Republic; 4.395572°N 18.560139°E
- Type: Human stampede
- Cause: people flee after a nearby explosion
- Deaths: 29
- Injuries: 280+

On 25 June 2025, 29 students were killed and more than 280 were injured in a crush in Bangui, Central African Republic at Barthelemy Boganda High School during the second day of the baccalaureate exams. The event was triggered by an explosion at a nearby electricity transformer which caused panic among the 6000 students who were taking the exam.

The explosion occurred when power was being restored to a malfunctioned electrical transformer on the ground floor of the main building. The resultant noise and smoke caused alarm among the students who were taking the history and geography exams, leading them to flee towards the small door on the upper floors. Most of the victims, including 16 girls, died at the scene during the stampede while others were confirmed dead at the hospital. Some students died after jumping out of the building in an attempt to escape. The victims were transported via ambulance, pickup trucks and motorbikes. The incident quickly overwhelmed local hospitals. According to Abel Assaye, the Director General of the Community Hospital, the hospital received 85 patients and 15 had died, including 2 pregnant women.

== Aftermath and reactions ==
A period of three days of national mourning from 27 June to 29 June was declared by President Faustin-Archange Touadéra. He also ordered that the 280 injured students get free treatment in hospital. The Minister of education Aurélien-Simplice Zingas offered his condolences to affected families and students. He also announced that further exams were suspended. Government officials who arrived at the scene were pelted with different objects by local residents who accused them of negligence. Gédéon Cyr Ngaïssé, president of the school’s parents’ association condemned the incident which he attributed to poor maintenance and called for an investigation. The Republican Bloc for the Defence of the Constitution, a coalition of opposition parties, also condemned the incident and blamed the authorities for irresponsibility. There were also official international condolences; including from Turkey.

An extensive investigation was started into the cause of the disaster.
