= Dorothée Aimée Malenzapa =

Minister of Rural Development
- In office 3 February 2013 – 31 March 2013
- President: François Bozizé; Michel Djotodia
- Prime Minister: Nicolas Tiangaye
- Preceded by: Fidèle Gouandjika
- Succeeded by: Jérémie Tchimanguere

Minister of International Cooperation, Regional Integration and Francophonie
- In office 22 April 2011 – 3 February 2013
- President: François Bozizé
- Prime Minister: Faustin-Archange Touadéra
- Preceded by: Antoine Gambi
- Succeeded by: Anicet Parfait Mbaye

Personal details
- Born: 1951
- Died: 23 December 2025 (aged 73–74)
- Party: KNK

Dorothée Aimée Malenzapa (1951 - 23 December 2025) was a Central African politician, women's activist, and professor. During Bozize's administration, she served as Minister of Rural Development (2013) and Minister of International Cooperation, Regional Integration and Francophonie (2011–2013).

== Biography ==
Born in 1951, Malenzapa worked as Professor of African Literature at Ecole Normale Supérieure de Bangui (Higher Teacher Training College of Bangui). From 1993 to 1998, she served as an Ambassador to the Francophonie in Paris. While serving as an ambassador, she founded the Association of Women Educators for Development in the Central African Republic (AFEDEC) in 1994. In 1998, she attended the 48th session of the Conference of Education Ministers of Countries Using French as a Common Language (CONFEMEN) in Yamoussoukro from 26 to 30 October 1998 as an observer. She also founded an NGO named Educational Relief in the Central African Republic (SECA) in an unknown year.

Before becoming minister, Malenzapa worked at the OIF. She joined Kwa Na Kwa in an unknown year. Touadéra appointed her as Minister of International Cooperation, Regional Integration and Francophonie on 22 April 2011. On 3 February 2013, she became Minister of Rural Development, replacing Fidèle Gouandjika. She stepped down as Minister of Rural Development on 31 March 2013 after Tiangaye reshuffled his cabinet and Jérémie Tchimanguere replaced her position.

After resigning from a ministerial position, Malenzapa founded two NGOs, which were the Network for Supporting Political Leadership of Central African Women (RESOLEP-FC) (2015) and the Collective of Women of Central African Civil Society (2016). Within the RESOLEP-FC, she served as its coordinator until her death. While serving as RESOLEP-FC coordinator, she became a speaker at the Capacity Building Technical Workshop held in Brazzaville on 14–15 November 2016, where she delivered an assessment on policies implementation in the Central Africa region. She also a member of The Francophone Network for Gender Equality (RF-EFH), representing AFEDEC. She became a speaker at the RF-EFH panel held in March 2024 where she delivered strategies to bolster women empowerment to combat the feminization of poverty.

Malenzapa died on 23 December 2025. Her funeral was held on 17 January 2026 and Touadera attended it.
