= Sofiane Khadda =

French footballer (born 1991)

Personal information
- Full name: Sofiane Khadda
- Date of birth: December 23, 1991 (age 34)
- Place of birth: Vesoul, France
- Height: 1.81 m (5 ft 11 in)
- Position: Midfielder

Senior career*
Years	Team	Apps	(Gls)
2012–2014	Vesoul	51	(12)
2014–2016	Belfort	42	(0)
2016–2018	LB Châteauroux	49	(4)
2018–2020	Xanthi	25	(0)
- * Club domestic league appearances and goals as of 7 May 2019

Sofiane Khadda (born 23 December 1991) is a French professional footballer who plays as a midfielder.

== Professional career ==
Khadda made his professional debut for LB Châteauroux in a 3–2 Ligue 2 win over Stade Brestois 29, wherein he scored the winner in extra time.

On 6 August 2018, Khadda moves to the Greek Super League club Xanthi.
