= Sonny M'Pokomandji =

Member of National Assembly
- In office 2005–?
- Constituency: Nola

Minister of Equipment and Transport
- In office 31 March 2003 – 19 June 2005
- President: François Bozizé
- Prime Minister: Abel Goumba; Célestin Gaombalet
- Preceded by: André Tobi Kotazo
- Succeeded by: Charles Massi

Personal details
- Born: 29 February 1948 (age 78) Bangui, Ubangi-Shari (now the Central African Republic)
- Spouse: Rose Francine
- Relations: Théophile Sonny Colé (brother)
- Children: 4
- Occupation: Basketball player Air transportation expert Politician
- Basketball career

Career information
- High school: Lycée des Rapides; Lycée Barthélémy Boganda
- College: University of Perpignan Via Domitia; Montpellier 2 University; École nationale de l'aviation civile

Career history
- Hit Trésor SC
- Basket Olympique Perpignanais
- Montpellier Université Club
Medals
Event	1st	2nd	3rd
FIBA Africa Championship	1	0	1
Total	1	0	1
Men's basketball
Representing Central African Republic
FIBA Africa Championship
Gold medal – first place	1974 Central African Republic	
Bronze medal – third place	1968 Morocco	

Sonny M'Pokomandji (born 29 February 1948), nicknamed M'Pokson, is a retired Central African basketball player, air transport expert, and politician. He represented Central African Republic in the FIBA Africa Championship in 1968, 1970, and 1974. Later, he served as Minister of Equipment and Transport (2003–2005).

== Early life and education ==
M'Pokomandji was born in Bangui on 29 February 1948. He is the third child of seven siblings. His father, Ambroise Sonny, is from Kouango, while his mother, Elisabeth Sapki, hails from Satema. He moved to Sarh in an unknown year since his parents, who worked as a civil servant, were posted there and enrolled in Saint-François Xavier Catholic School. While living in Sarh, he enjoyed watching AS Tempête Mocaf matches against a local team.

In 1960, M'Pokomandji moved to Bangui and lived in Lakouanga District. At first, he wanted to study at the Catholic schools of Saint Louis and Saint Charles. However, he was rejected at those schools and accepted at Ecole Lakouanga instead. One year later, he finished his primary education and moved to Berbérati to continue his high school education at Juvenat College after being invited by Brother Claude, the former manager of Fu Manchu Club.

Upon finishing 9th grade in Berberati, M'Pokomandji moved to Bangui and enrolled at Lycée des Rapides, where he finished his 10th and 11th grades. Later on, he was transferred to Lycée Barthélémy Boganda and completed his 12th grade. After passing the baccalaureate, Bokassa sent M'Pokomandji to Morocco to study civil engineering after his visit to the country. However, the major did not exist in Morocco yet and he decided to study at the University of Perpignan, taking math and physics. Later, he enrolled at Montpellier 2 University and completed his bachelor's and master's degrees in Electrical Engineering and Automation. Subsequently, he was admitted to École nationale de l'aviation civile and earned a civil aviation engineering degree in 1974.

== Sport career ==
=== Football ===
M'Pokomandji developed his passion for football when he was dwelling in Sarh. During his school year at Ecole Lakouanga, he played football with his schoolfellows. At one time, his schoolmates Joseph Marcel Bimalé and Eloi Limbio, who were playing for Brazza (now TP USCA Bangui) and Fu Manchu (now Publique Sportive Mouara), respectively, persuaded M'Pokomandji to join their respective clubs. Afterward, he decided to draw lots to determine the clubs that he wanted because he did not want to dismay his friends. Eloi won, and M'Pokomandji then joined Fu Manchu's junior team. He ended his football career after being recruited to the Hit Tresor Sporting Club basketball team.

=== Basketball ===
M'Pokomandji began his basketball journey when he studied at Ecole Lakounga. When he studied in Berberati, he played basketball and represented College Normal Berberati in 1964, where the team won the competition after defeating Lycée Barthélémy Boganda in the final. During the 1967–1968 school year, M'Pokomandji was selected for the Berberati selection squad in a match against Hit Tresor. Berberati's selection managed to defeat Hit Tresor in the first match in the town. Later, the match was replayed in Bangui, and Hit Tresor won. After the match, Hit Tresor captain François Péhoua recruited M'Pokomandji to his team.

M'Pokomandji joined the national team and played the first game for the Central African Republic in 1966 against Zaire in Kinshasa. In his final school year, he was included in the Central African Republic national Basketball team at the 1968 FIBA Africa Championship, where the team finished in third place. In 1973, he played for Hit Tresor in the 1973 FIBA Africa Basketball League, and the team became the league champion after defeating Dial Diop.

M'Pokomandji still played basketball when he pursued his higher education in France. He joined Basket Olympique Perpignanais when he lived in Perpignan. Later, he played for Montpellier University Club. While playing for Montpellier University Club, he was called to the Central African basketball squad for the FIBA Africa Championship 1972, and the team finished in fourth place. Two years later, he played for the Central African team at the FIBA Africa Championship 1974, and the team became the champions. As a result, Bokassa rewarded each player with 300,000 CFA, while Catherine Denguiadé promised to present Renault 4. Although the players received the prize from Bokassa, Renault 4 was not delivered to them since the Cameroonian Port Authority sold the cars in the auction due to the inability to pay storage and custody fees. He was also included in the national team squad at the 1974 FIBA World Championship.

Although he has retired from basketball, he still gets involved in it. He joined the Association of Former International Basketball Players of the Central African Republic (AIBCA), and as the president of AIBCA, he implored the government to rehabilitate the dilapidated sports infrastructures that were ravaged during the war. In February 2021, he became the Central African Basketball Federation (FCBB) president candidate, promising to restore the country's basketball. However, he lost the election to Aimé Serge Singa. In 2022, the government dissolved the FCBB board and formed the crisis committee, in which M'Pokomandji became the chairman.

== Professional career and detainment ==
After finishing his higher education with a civil aviation engineering degree, he returned to CAR and worked at ACESNA. However, his career at ACENSEA was ended in 1976 due to the coup plot. On 16 February 1976, while M'Pokomandji and ICAO officials inspected the Bangui M'Poko International Airport runway, a grenade was thrown at Bokassa when he was to board a flight to N'Délé. Although the grenade failed to explode, M’pokomandji and the other ACESNA officials were called to the Council of Ministers for questioning. Later, he wrote and sent a letter to his colleague in Toulouse, Joseph Ndoro, about the coup in which the coup plotters were arrested and some were exiled. The country's censorship service prevented the letter from reaching Ndoro since it was considered "an act of subversion against Bokassa". This letter caused M'Pokomandji to be arrested.

M'Pokomandji was sentenced to nine years in prison and fined 300,000 CFA francs by a military tribunal. He was jailed in Ngaragba Central Prison for nine months and shared a cell with political prisoners and highway robbers. On 4 December 1977, Bokassa gave M'Pokomandji and other hundred prisoners amnesty on the occasion of the Coronation of Bokassa I and Catherine on the condition that they were prohibited from taking jobs in public administration.

Upon his release from detainment, M'Pokomandji became a businessman. He opened a small beverage business called Carrefour in Bangui, which attracted expatriate customers. Later, an expatriate who also became his loyal customer offered him a job as warehouse manager at Oubangui-Automobiles, and he accepted. Subsequently, he resigned and got a new job as an Air Transport Expert at the United Nations Economic Commission for Africa (ECA) in Addis Ababa. After the fall of the Bokassa regime, the Central African Republic rejoined ASECNA, and he became the country's representative. However, he was dismissed as the Central African Workers’ Union (USTC) was dissolved due to the long strike. Nevertheless, he later reentered ASECNA and was posted in Dakar and later Paris for four years.

M'Pokomandji left ASECNA in 2000 and returned to Bangui, where he and his younger brothers established a freight forwarding company called Mondial Air Fret (MAF).

== Political career ==
M'Pokomandji was appointed Minister of Equipment and Transport in 2003 and served until 2005. During his tenure, he served as the Air CEMAC project coordinator and signed a border closure with DRC in 2003. Furthermore, he was accused of obstructing the liquidation of Air Afrique.

M'Pokomandji ran for the MP candidate in the 2005 Central African general election representing Nola and won a seat at the National Assembly. In the 2011 election, he was reelected as an MP representing Nola 1 District after the constitutional court declared him the winner by invalidating Aliou Bapetel's victory. Previously, his supporters staged a demonstration in Bangui Street on 8 April to protest the vote theft of M'Pokomandji's rival.

During Djotida's presidency, he was appointed as a National Transitional Council (NTC) member in May 2013. However, his appointment as an NTC member sparked protests from Sangha-Mbaéré residents who claimed that he was not an appropriate person to represent the prefecture and asked the government to endorse Paulin Pomodimo instead. Under Samba-Panza administration, he was part of the Transitional Counselor from 2014 to 2016.

== Personal life ==
M'Pokomandji belongs to Banda and married Rose Francine, a daughter of police commissioner Gaston Ouakara-Sow. The couples have three sons and one daughter.
