= Théophile Sonny Colé =

Central African politician and footballer (born 1945)

Member of National Assembly
- In office 2005–2016
- Constituency: Bangui

Personal details
- Born: 1 June 1945 (age 81) Bianga, Kouango, Ubangi-Shari (now the present-day Central African Republic)
- Relations: Sonny M'Pokomandji (brother)
- Parents: Ambroise Sonny (father); Elisabeth Sapki (mother)
- Occupation: Footballer player Politician; Activist
Association football career
- Position: Defender
Senior career*
Years	Team	Apps	(Gls)
?	Olympic Real de Bangui		
International career
1972	Central African Republic		
- * Club domestic league appearances and goals

Théophile Sonny Colé (born 1 June 1945) is a Central African politician, trade union activist, and footballer. He had played for the country's football team, and later became a politician, being elected to the National Assembly in 2005.

== Early life ==
Colé was born on 1 June 1945 in Bianga to Ambroise Sonny and Elisabeth Sapki. He is the first child of seven children and the older brother of a Central African basketball player, Sonny M'Pokomandji.

== Football career ==
Colé played as a defender at the Olympic Real de Bangui. He was one of the 27 players who were called to the Central African Republic national team in 1972 and took part in the match against Cameroon where Central African Republic won 4–3. On 3 November 2022, he and 10 other 1972 Central African Republic squad players who were still alive received a gift of 500,000 CFA from Central African Football Federation and 300,000 CFA from BGFIBank Group each for their achievements in defeating Cameroon.

After retirement, he serves as the vice president of Olympic Real de Bangui.

== Activism and politics ==
Colé joined USTC and became its secretary general in 1980. He organized and led strikes during Dacko administration, resulting in the dissolution of USTC. In the 1990s, he led a civil servant strike to protest the unpaid salaries for months. During the 1992 election, he endorsed the candidate from Confederation of Democratic Forces (CFD). Furthermore, he was assigned as the coordinator of an opposition group, the Union of Forces Committed to Peace and Change (UFAPC). On 15 May 1998, he was designated as the operations director of a freight company, Mondial Air Fret.

Presidential Guard arrested Colé upon his arrival in Bangui M'Poko International Airport after attending a conference on 9 January 1999 for writing a tract that Patassé deemed "seditious". He was tortured, causing him to lose two teeth and be injured in the head. On the following day, he was released. He became Patasse's commando assassination target in November 2000. On 17 June 2001, he was arrested at the Bangui Airport after participating in a meeting in Nairobi. On the following day, the government released him. After the 2001 Central African Republic coup attempt, he was called for trial in the court over accusations of involvement in the plots.

Colé was called to the Truth and Reconciliation Commission for the testimony to investigate the deep rift between David Dacko and Abel Goumba. He ran as an independent MP candidate representing Bangui Second district in the 2005 Central African general election and won a seat in the National Assembly with a vote of 53,30%. During his first term, he founded the Bangui's 2nd arrondissement High Management Council on 16 March 2007 with the aim to monitor projects and solve issues in his constituency.

In the 2011 Central African general election, Colé was reelected as a member of the National Assembly, obtaining a vote of 54%. On 13 April 2013, he was appointed as a member of the National Transitional Council as a syndicate's representative.

Colé became a presidential candidate for the 2015–16 election on 12 December 2015. He received 3,784 votes (0.33%), thus did not eligible for the second round. After receiving the result of the first round of the presidential election, he appealed for the audits to the Transitional Constitutional Court and his request was rejected. Apart from that, he failed to be re-elected to the National Assembly after conceding defeat to Massikini Mathurin in 2016.
