= Isaac Zokoué =

Central African theologian

Isaac Zokoué (September 17, 1944 — September 12, 2014) was a leading theologian in the Central African Republic. For 14 years he was the dean of the leading French-speaking evangelical seminary, Faculte de Theologie Evangelique de Bangui.

Zokoué wrote a number of books and articles about harmonizing Christian ideas to African cultures, including “Jésus-Christ sauveur : le mystère des deux natures: perspective africaine,” his doctorate thesis in theology at the University of Strasbourg.

Because of his prominence as a religious leader, he was asked to lead the Preliminary Committee for the National Debate in 2003, which was meant to find a way of ending the cycle of coups and civil war in the country.
