= Diego José =

Argentine footballer

Personal information
- Full name: Diego Jesus José
- Date of birth: December 11, 1976 (age 49)
- Place of birth: Rosario, Argentina
- Height: 1.84 m (6 ft 1/2 in)
- Position: Striker

Team information
- Current team: U.S. PONS

Senior career*
Years	Team	Apps	(Gls)
1996 –1998	Rosario Central	15	(2)
1998 –1999	Tigre	34	(19)
1999–2000	All Boys	21	(6)
2000	AS Angoulême	5	(0)
2000–2003	FC Rouen	74	(28)
2003–2006	US Raon-l'Étape	79	(30)
2006–2009	Vesoul Haute-Saône	117	(54)
2009–2010	Montceau Bourgogne	38	(12)
2010–2011	Jura Sud Foot	35	(9)
2011–2012	Vesoul Haute-Saône	21	(7)
2012–2015	AS Cozes		
2015–	Presqu'île FC		
2016-2019	Saujon		
2019-2020	ES Saintes		
2020-2021	US Pons		
- * Club domestic league appearances and goals

Diego Jesus José (born December 11, 1976, in Rosario) is an Argentine professional footballer. He currently plays for U.S. PONS.

José played on the professional level in the Primera División Argentina for Rosario Central.
