= Stathis Chatzilampros =

Greek footballer (1997–2024)

Personal information
- Full name: Efstathios Chatzilampros
- Date of birth: 24 June 1997
- Place of birth: Thebes, Greece
- Date of death: 23 June 2024 (aged 26)
- Place of death: Greece
- Height: 1.80 m (5 ft 11 in)
- Position: Right-back

Youth career
- –2015: Levadiakos

Senior career*
Years	Team	Apps	(Gls)
2015–2020	Levadiakos	11	(0)
2017–2018	→ Thiva (loan)		
2022–2023	P.A.O. Rouf	10	(0)
- * Club domestic league appearances and goals

Stathis Chatzilampros (Greek: Στάθης Χατζηλάμπρος; 24 June 1997 – 23 June 2024) was a Greek professional footballer who played as a right-back.

Chatzilampros died on 23 June 2024, at the age of 26 and one day before his 27th birthday, as the result of a traffic collision.
