= Télévision Centrafricaine =

National television station of Central African Republic

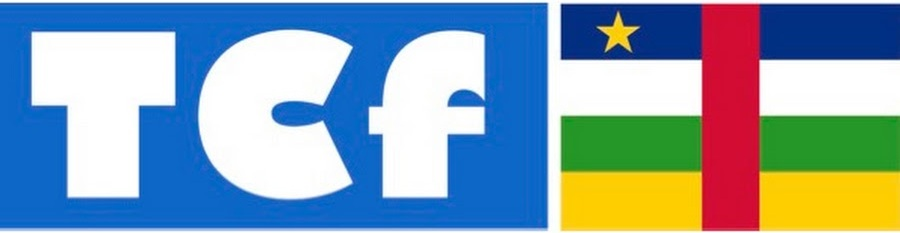
- Logo used since 1 October 2021
- Industry: Broadcasting
- Founded: 22 February 1974; 52 years ago
- Headquarters: Bangui, Central African Republic
- Area served: Central African Republic & abroad (satellite)
- Key people: Alfred Ngoe-Bengue (Director General)
- Owner: Minister of Communication & Media
- Website: telecentrafricaine.cf

Télévision Centrafricaine (TCF) is the national television station of Central African Republic. TCF broadcasts in French and Sango.

== History ==
In March 1966, future self-proclaimed Emperor Jean-Bédel Bokassa received a plan from Israeli prime minister Golda Meir to install a television center in Bangui, the capital. Israeli aid was limited to financial support, as technical equipment came from France. In November 1969, the Israelis gained further credits to for its opening, without the need of a feasibility study. Its initial infrastructure consisted of a reporting van, and a black and white production center in Bangui (with two studios, 50 sq m and 150 sq m respectively). The production center was connected by terrestrial waves to a transmission center with a power of 2kW which made it possible to broadcast the broadcast signal over a radius of nearly 250km, thanks to a retransmitter installed in M'Baïki, located nearly 100km close to Bangui. The signal didn't reach the hinterland, which wasn't properly electrified at the time.

At the time of its launch, five ORTF representatives went to Bangui to supervise the journalists, cameramen and other maintenance technicians, who had all received their studies at the National Audiovisual Institute in Paris, with more than five years of experience. Its estimated budget to operate was of CFA 150 million.

Founded on 22 February 1974 during the Bokassa Regime under the abbreviation of TVCA, TVCA began its broadcast in black and white. In 1985, TVCA switched its broadcasts to color. At the end of the 80s, the station was led by Minister of Communications Joaquim da Silva Nzengue, secretary general Hubert Mary Djamany and director-general Patrice Yazenga.

In the aftermath of the 2001 Central African Republic coup d'état attempt, TVCA broadcast for five hours from 12 PM to 5 PM. It lasted until mid-June 2003 when TVCA extended its broadcast hours from 2 PM to 10 PM. On 16 July 2003, TVCA went off for 48 hours due to aging technical installations. It subsequently resumed broadcasts two days later on 18 July 2003.

Starting on 24 November 2011, TVCA began to be available on satellite, reaching the whole country. On 6 August 2019, TVCA office underwent renovation. The renovation lasted for five months and Touadéra inaugurated the newly rehabilitated office on 2 March 2020. TVCA changed its name to TCF and its logo on 2 October 2021.

== Current situation ==
Since the downfall of the Bokassa regime, TCF's quality has deteriorated. Currently, the TV station faces bad management and a lack of technical equipment. Moreover, TCF only has five cameras and does not has any shuttle vehicles for the journalists for field report. TCF does not has clear schedules for seven days, the image quality is poor, and often repeats the same program on the same day.

== Controversy ==
=== Porn film ===
In January 2023, TCF accidentally broadcast a porn film for a few minutes. This incident created negative responses among Central African internet users.

== Logo ==
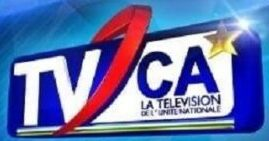
Logo until 30 September 2021

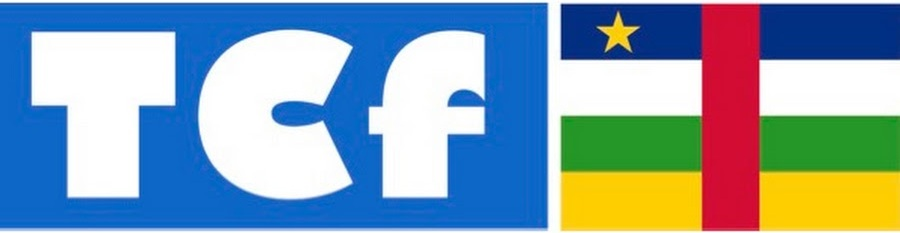
Logo since 1 October 2021 – present

== See also ==
- Telecommunications in the Central African Republic
