= General Union of Central African Workers =

Trade union center in the Central African Republic

USTC
- Union of Central African Workers
- Union Syndicale des Travailleurs de Centrafrique
- Headquarters: Bangui, Central African Republic
- Location: Central African Republic
- Members: 15,000
- Key people: Théophile Sonny-Colé, secretary general
- Affiliations: ITUC

The Union of Central African Workers, created in 1964, is a trade union centre in the Central African Republic. It was formed by the merger of the African Confederation of Free Trade Unions-Workers Force-Central African Republic, African Confederation of Believing Workers - Central African Republic, African General Confederation of Labour-Central African Republic and the FECETEC. In 1981, its activity was suspended by David Dacko's government. In place of it government-backed Confederation of Central African Workers was established, which didn't stand up for the rights of workers in practice.

It is affiliated with the International Trade Union Confederation.
