= Radio Centrafrique =

Bangui; Central African Republic
- Frequency: 106.9 MHz

Programming
- Format: Public broadcasting

Ownership
- Owner: Minister of Communication & Media

History
- First air date: 8 December 1958
- Former names: Radio Bangui

Radio Centrafrique is a public radio station in the Central African Republic that is funded by the Ministry of Communication and Media. It broadcasts in French and Sango.

== History ==
Radio Centrafrique was established on 8 December 1958 as Radio Bangui. The radio only aired in Bangui in the early period since it was only equipped with a 250-watt transmitter. In 1963, it replaced the first transmitters with the new one. During the Saint-Sylvestre coup d'état, the pro-Bokassa officers attacked the Radio Bangui headquarter and killed the guard. Afterward, they threatened to execute all the broadcasting staff. However, the plan was dropped due to the order from Alexandre Banza. Through Radio Bangui, Jean-Bedel Bokassa announced the coup publicly.

Entering the 1970s, a new 100 kW transmitter was installed in Bimbo, which not only enabled the radio coverage to reach the whole country but also some areas in the neighboring countries, such as Chad, Zaire, and the Republic of Congo, that near the CAR border. In September 1976, Radio Bangui was renamed La Voix de la Révolution, and three months later, it changed its name to La Voix de l’Empire Centrafricain. Later, it became Radio Centrafrique. Germany rehabilitated the radio in the 1980s.

In 2004, the director general of the radio, Delphine Zouta, stated that it might stop its operation due to the aging and broken equipment and the unavailability of the equipment's spare parts. On 29 November 2011, together with Télévision Centrafricaine, Radio Centrafrique became available on the satellite. In 2013, Seleka stole the radio's two transmitters (MW and Short Wave), prompting it to operate with the remaining FM transmitters that could only reach within a radius of 90 KM from the sites.

Radio Centrafrique was reportedly understaffed and operated with dilapidated equipment in 2014.In 2019, the radio received new transmitters from low to high that allowed its coverage to reach 800 km from the location.

== Structures and Organizations ==
Radio Centrafrique is divided into four departments:

- Department of Programs and Magazines
- Department of News and Information
- Department of Equipment
- Department of Rural Radio Programs

== Notable staffs ==
- Andre Kolingba
- Mireille Kolingba
- Henri Koba

== Bibliography ==
- Internews Network (May 2014). Radio Centrafrique: Institutional and Technical Assessment (PDF) (Report).
