= Affo Erassa =

Togolese football midfielder

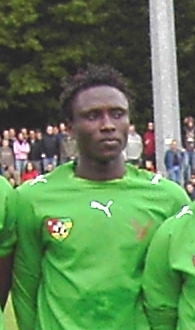
- Erassa with Togo in 2006

Personal information
- Full name: Affo Omorou Erassa
- Date of birth: 19 February 1983 (age 43)
- Place of birth: Lomé, Togo
- Height: 1.90 m (6 ft 3 in)
- Position: Midfielder

Senior career*
Years	Team	Apps	(Gls)
2001–2004	AC Merlan	50	(0)
2004–2005	Clermont	4	(0)
2005–2006	Moulins	10	(0)
2006–2007	RCO Agde	18	(2)
2008–2009	Montargis USM	13	(4)
2009–2017	AS Belfort Sud		

International career
1995–1996	Togo U-17	10	(0)
1998–2000	Togo U-20	6	(0)
2000–2006	Togo	18	(1)
- * Club domestic league appearances and goals

Affo Omorou Erassa (born 19 February 1983) is a Togolese former professional footballer who played as a midfielder. He spent most of his playing career in the lower divisions of France, representing clubs such as Clermont Foot and AS Moulins.

Erassa was a member of the Togo national football team during the 2000s and was included in Togo's squad for the 2006 FIFA World Cup. However, he did not make an appearance in the tournament.

== Club career ==
Erassa began his playing career with AC Merlan in Togo before moving to France in 2004, where he joined Clermont Foot. At Clermont, he made four appearances in Ligue 2 and six appearances in all competitions.

In 2005, he moved to AS Moulins, playing in the Championnat National. He made 10 league appearances for Moulins before continuing his career with lower-division French clubs, including RCO Agde, USM Montargis, and AS Belfort Sud.

Erassa primarily played as a defensive midfielder and was noted for his aerial ability, taking advantage of his 190 cm height, as well as his defensive work and ability to win possession in midfield.

== International career ==
Erassa represented the Togo national football team and was included in Togo's squad for the 2006 FIFA World Cup.

At the 2006 FIFA World Cup, Erassa was named among the substitutes for all three of Togo's group-stage matches against South Korea, Switzerland, and France, but did not make an appearance in any of the matches. Togo lost all three matches and were eliminated in the group stage.
