= Socatel =

Telecommunications company in Central African Republic

- Company type: Société d'Économie Mixte
- Industry: Telecommunications
- Founded: 1990
- Headquarters: Bangui, Central African Republic
- Website: www.socatel.cf

Socatel, officially the Société Centrafricaine de Télécommunications (English: Central African Telecommunications Company), is the leading telecommunications and Internet service provider in the Central African Republic. The Central African government owns 60% of its stock, with France Câbles et Radio, an affiliate of France Telecom, owning 40%.

Socatel's subsidiaries include Caratel, a mobile phone service provider.

== See also ==
- Telecommunications in the Central African Republic
