= December 20 =

354th day of the year

December 20 this year in various calendars
- Sunday, 20 December 2026
Akan	Nwonakwasi
Armenian	3 Arach 1476
Aztec	Tozoztontli 19, 7 Malīnalli
Babylonian	10 Kislimu, 2337 SE
Balinese pawukon	Menga, Beteng, Laba, Umanis, Aryang, Redite of Warigadian, Indra, Jangur, Pandita
Bengali	5 Poush, BS 1433
Chinese	Yang Earth Dragon・Emptiness Mansion; Fire Horse Year, Month 11, Day 12 (Daxue, 2 days until Dongzhi)
Common Era	20 December 2026 CE
Coptic	11 Koiak, AM 1743
Egyptian	8 Pachon, 2775 NE
Ethiopian	11 Tākḫśāś, 2019 Amätä Məhrät
French Republican	Décade III, Nonidi de Frimaire de l'Année 235 de la République
Gregorian	20 December, AD 2026
Hebrew	10 Tevet, AM 5787
Hindu	Aśvinī・Parigha; Solar: 5 Pauṣa, 1948 SE; Lunisolar: Ekādaśī, Śukla pakṣa of Mārgaśīrṣa, 2083 VE; Rāudra・5127 KY・1,872,929
Icelandic	Sunnudagur, 28 Ýlir 2026
Islamic	10 Rajab, AH 1448 (using tabular method)
ISO week date	2026-W51-7
Japanese	12 Shimotsuki, Reiwa 8 (Taisetsu, 2 days until Tōji)
Julian	7 December, AD 2026 (AM 7535)
Julian day	2461395
Korean	12 Jwidal, 4359 DE
Maya	13.0.14.3.12; 5 Kankin, 7 Eb
Roman	ante diem VII Idus Decembres, MMDCCLXXIX AUC
Solar Hijri	29 Azar, SH 1405
Tibetan	11 mgo, me pho rta 2153 or 1772 or 1000

<<	December					>>
Su	Mo	Tu	We	Th	Fr	Sa
		1	2	3	4	5
6	7	8	9	10	11	12
13	14	15	16	17	18	19
20	21	22	23	24	25	26
27	28	29	30	31
2026

December 20 in recent years
2025 (Saturday)
2024 (Friday)
2023 (Wednesday)
2022 (Tuesday)
2021 (Monday)
2020 (Sunday)
2019 (Friday)
2018 (Thursday)
2017 (Wednesday)
2016 (Tuesday)

December 20 is the 354th day of the year (355th in leap years) in the Gregorian calendar; 11 days remain until the end of the year.

== Events ==
=== Pre-1600 ===
- AD 69 – Antonius Primus enters Rome to claim the title of Emperor for Nero's former general Vespasian.
- 944 – Byzantine Emperor Romanos I Lekapenos is arrested by two of his sons, forced to abdicate and to live as a monk for the rest of his life.
- 1046 – Emperor Henry III convenes the synod of Sutri to mediate between different claimants to the papacy.
- 1192 – Richard I of England is captured and imprisoned by Leopold V of Austria on his way home to England after the Third Crusade.
- 1334 – Cardinal Jacques Fournier, a Cistercian monk, is elected Pope Benedict XII.

=== 1601–1900 ===
- 1803 – The Louisiana Purchase is completed at a ceremony in New Orleans.
- 1808 – Peninsular War: The Siege of Zaragoza begins.
- 1832 – HMS Clio under the command of Captain Onslow arrives at Port Egmont under orders to take possession of the Falkland Islands.
- 1848 – French presidential election: Having won the popular vote in a landslide, Louis Napoleon Bonaparte is inaugurated in the chamber of the National Assembly as the first (and only) president of the French Second Republic.
- 1860 – South Carolina becomes the first state to attempt to secede from the United States with the South Carolina Declaration of Secession.

=== 1901–present ===
- 1915 – World War I: The last Australian troops are evacuated from Gallipoli.
- 1917 – Cheka, the first Soviet secret police force, is founded.
- 1924 – Adolf Hitler is released from Landsberg Prison.
- 1940 – Captain America Comics #1, containing the first appearance of the superhero Captain America, is published.
- 1941 – World War II: First battle of the American Volunteer Group, better known as the "Flying Tigers", in Kunming, China.
- 1942 – World War II: Japanese air forces bomb Calcutta, India.
- 1946 – It's a Wonderful Life premieres at the Globe Theatre in New York to mixed reviews. [1]
- 1946 – An earthquake in Nankaidō, Japan causes a tsunami which kills at least one thousand people and destroys 36,000 homes.
- 1948 – Indonesian National Revolution: The Dutch military captures Yogyakarta, the temporary capital of the newly formed Republic of Indonesia.
- 1951 – The EBR-1 in Arco, Idaho becomes the first nuclear power plant to generate electricity. The electricity powered four light bulbs.
- 1952 – A United States Air Force C-124 crashes and burns in Moses Lake, Washington, killing 87 of the 115 people on board.
- 1955 – Cardiff is proclaimed the capital city of Wales, United Kingdom.
- 1957 – The initial production version of the Boeing 707 makes its first flight.
- 1960 – Vietnam War: The National Liberation Front of South Vietnam, popularly known as the Viet Cong, is formally established in Tân Lập village, present day Tây Ninh province.
- 1968 – The Zodiac Killer murders his first two officially confirmed victims, David Arthur Faraday and Betty Lou Jensen, on Lake Herman Road in Benicia, California, United States.
- 1970 – Koza riot: After a series of hit-and-runs and other vehicular incidents involving American service personnel, roughly 5,000 Okinawans take to the streets, clashing with American law enforcement in protest against the U.S. occupation of Okinawa.
- 1973 – Assassination of Luis Carrero Blanco: A car bomb planted by ETA in Madrid kills three people, including the Prime Minister of Spain, Admiral Luis Carrero Blanco.
- 1977 – With the approval of the State Council, China's two largest newspapers, the People's Daily and the Guangming Daily, publish in full for the first time the Second Chinese Character Simplification Scheme.
- 1984 – The Summit Tunnel fire, one of the largest transportation tunnel fires in history, burns after a freight train carrying over one million liters of gasoline derails near the town of Todmorden, England, in the Pennines.
- 1984 – Disappearance of Jonelle Matthews from Greeley, Colorado. Her remains were discovered on July 23, 2019, located about 24 km (15 mi) southeast of Jonelle's home. The cause of death "was a gunshot wound to the head."
- 1985 – Pope John Paul II announces the creation of World Youth Day.
- 1987 – In the worst peacetime sea disaster, the passenger ferry Doña Paz sinks after colliding with the oil tanker MT Vector in the Tablas Strait of the Philippines, killing an estimated 4,000 people (1,749 official).
- 1988 – War on drugs: The United Nations agrees upon and promulgates the United Nations Convention Against Illicit Traffic in Narcotic Drugs and Psychotropic Substances, one of three major drug control treaties currently in force.
- 1989 – The United States invasion of Panama deposes Manuel Noriega.
- 1991 – A Missouri court sentences the Palestinian militant Zein Isa and his wife Maria to death for the honor killing of their daughter Palestina.
- 1995 – American Airlines Flight 965, a Boeing 757, crashes into a mountain 50 km north of Cali, Colombia, killing 159 of the 163 people on board.
- 1999 – Macau is handed over to China by Portugal.
- 2004 – A gang of thieves steal £26.5 million worth of currency from the Donegall Square West headquarters of Northern Bank in Belfast, Northern Ireland, United Kingdom, one of the largest bank robberies in British history.
- 2007 – Elizabeth II becomes the oldest monarch in the history of the United Kingdom, surpassing Queen Victoria, who lived for 81 years and 243 days.
- 2007 – The Portrait of Suzanne Bloch (1904), by the Spanish artist Pablo Picasso, and O Lavrador de Café by Brazilian modernist painter Cândido Portinari, are stolen from the São Paulo Museum of Art in Brazil. Both will be recovered a few weeks later.
- 2016 – Aerosucre Flight 157 crashes during takeoff from Germán Olano Airport in Puerto Carreño, Colombia, killing five people.
- 2019 – The United States Space Force becomes the first new branch of the United States Armed Forces since 1947.
- 2024 – Six people are killed and over 200 are injured when an anti-Islam activist drives a car into a crowd at a Christmas market in Magdeburg, Germany.
- 2024 – A mass stabbing occurs in a primary school in Zagreb, Croatia, in which a 7-year-old pupil is killed and six more are injured by a knife-wielding 19-year-old male.

== Births ==
=== Pre-1600 ===
- 1494 – Oronce Finé, French mathematician and cartographer (died 1555)
- 1496 – Joseph ha-Kohen, historian and physician (died 1575)
- 1537 – John III, king of Sweden (died 1592)
- 1576 – John Sarkander, Moravian priest and saint (died 1620)

=== 1601–1900 ===
- 1626 – Veit Ludwig von Seckendorff, German scholar and politician (died 1692)
- 1629 – Pieter de Hooch, Dutch painter (died 1684)
- 1641 – Urban Hjärne, Swedish chemist, geologist, and physician (died 1724)
- 1740 – Arthur Lee, American physician and diplomat (died 1792)
- 1786 – Pietro Raimondi, Italian composer (died 1853)
- 1792 – Nicolas Toussaint Charlet, French painter and educator (died 1845)
- 1806 – Martín Carrera, Mexican general and president (1855) (died 1871)
- 1812 – Laura M. Hawley Thurston, American poet and educator (died 1842)
- 1838 – Edwin Abbott Abbott, English theologian, author, and educator (died 1926)
- 1841 – Ferdinand Buisson, French academic and politician, Nobel Prize laureate (died 1932)
- 1851 – Knut Wicksell, Swedish economist (died 1926)
- 1861 – Ferdinand Bonn, German actor (died 1933)
- 1861 – Ivana Kobilca, Slovenian painter (died 1926)
- 1865 – Elsie de Wolfe, American actress and interior decorator (died 1950)
- 1868 – Harvey Samuel Firestone, American businessman, founded the Firestone Tire and Rubber Company (died 1938)
- 1869 – Charley Grapewin, American actor (died 1956)
- 1871 – Henry Kimball Hadley, American composer and conductor (died 1937)
- 1873 – Kan'ichi Asakawa, Japanese historian, author, and academic (died 1948)
- 1873 – Mehmet Akif Ersoy, Turkish poet, academic, and politician (died 1936)
- 1874 – Mary Ann Bevan, English nurse who, after developing acromegaly, toured the circus sideshow circuit as "the ugliest woman in the world" (died 1933)
- 1881 – Branch Rickey, American baseball player and manager (died 1965)
- 1884 – Ruhana Kuddus, Indonesian activist and journalist (died 1972)
- 1886 – Hazel Hotchkiss Wightman, American tennis player and businessman (died 1974)
- 1888 – Yitzhak Baer, German-Israeli historian and academic (died 1980)
- 1888 – Fred Merkle, American baseball player and manager (died 1956)
- 1890 – Yvonne Arnaud, French pianist, actress and singer (died 1958)
- 1890 – Jaroslav Heyrovský, Czech chemist and academic, Nobel Prize laureate (died 1967)
- 1891 – Erik Almlöf, Swedish triple jumper (died 1971)
- 1894 – Robert Menzies, Australian lawyer and politician, 12th Prime Minister of Australia (died 1978)
- 1898 – Konstantinos Dovas, Greek general and politician, 156th Prime Minister of Greece (died 1973)
- 1898 – Irene Dunne, American actress and singer (died 1990)
- 1899 – Martyn Lloyd-Jones, Welsh preacher and physician (died 1981)
- 1900 – Lissy Arna, German actress (died 1964)
- 1900 – Gabby Hartnett, American baseball player and manager (died 1972)

=== 1901–present ===
- 1901 – Robert J. Van de Graaff, American physicist and academic, invented the Van de Graaff generator (died 1967)
- 1902 – Prince George, Duke of Kent (died 1942)
- 1902 – Sidney Hook, American philosopher and author (died 1989)
- 1904 – Spud Davis, American baseball player, coach, and manager (died 1984)
- 1904 – Yevgenia Ginzburg, Russian author (died 1977)
- 1905 – Bill O'Reilly, Australian cricketer and sportscaster (died 1992)
- 1907 – Paul Francis Webster, American soldier and songwriter (died 1984)
- 1908 – Dennis Morgan, American actor and singer (died 1994)
- 1909 – Vakkom Majeed, Indian journalist and politician (died 2000)
- 1911 – Hortense Calisher, American author (died 2009)
- 1914 – Harry F. Byrd Jr., American lieutenant, publisher, and politician (died 2013)
- 1915 – Aziz Nesin, Turkish author and poet (died 1995)
- 1916 – Michel Chartrand, Canadian trade union leader and activist (died 2010)
- 1917 – David Bohm, American-English physicist, neuropsychologist, and philosopher (died 1992)
- 1917 – Cahit Külebi, Turkish poet and author (died 1997)
- 1917 – Audrey Totter, American actress (died 2013)
- 1918 – Jean Marchand, Canadian trade union leader and politician, 43rd Secretary of State for Canada (died 1988)
- 1920 – Väinö Linna, Finnish author (died 1992)
- 1921 – George Roy Hill, American director, producer, and screenwriter (died 2002)
- 1922 – Beverly Pepper, American sculptor and painter (died 2020)
- 1922 – William Soeryadjaya, Chinese-Indonesian businessman and co-founder of Astra International (died 2010)
- 1924 – Charlie Callas, American actor and comedian (died 2011)
- 1924 – Judy LaMarsh, Canadian soldier, lawyer, and politician, 42nd Secretary of State for Canada (died 1980)
- 1925 – Benito Lorenzi, Italian footballer (died 2007)
- 1926 – Marcel Douzima, Central African lawyer and politician (died 2012)
- 1926 – Geoffrey Howe, Welsh lawyer and politician, Deputy Prime Minister of the United Kingdom (died 2015)
- 1926 – Otto Graf Lambsdorff, German lawyer and politician, German Federal Minister of Economics (died 2009)
- 1927 – Michael Beaumont, 22nd Seigneur of Sark, English engineer and politician (died 2016)
- 1927 – Jim Simpson, American sportscaster (died 2016)
- 1927 – Kim Young-sam, South Korean soldier and politician, 7th President of South Korea (died 2015)
- 1927 – James Lawrence King, American jurist (died 2026)
- 1928 – John Menkes, Austrian-American pediatric and writer (died 2008)
- 1929 – Milan Panić, Serbian businessman and politician, 1st Prime Minister of FR Yugoslavia (died 2026)
- 1929 – Don Sunderlage, American basketball player (died 1961)
- 1931 – Mala Powers, American actress (died 2007)
- 1931 – Hristina Obradović, Serbian hegumenia and abbess (died 2026)
- 1932 – Antoine Mbary-Daba, Central African politician, bureaucrat, and diplomat (died c. 1997).
- 1932 – John Hillerman, American actor (died 2017)
- 1933 – Olavi Salonen, Finnish runner (died 2025)
- 1933 – Rik Van Looy, Belgian cyclist (died 2024)
- 1935 – Khalid Ibadulla, Pakistani cricketer and sportscaster (died 2024)
- 1939 – Kathryn Joosten, American actress (died 2012)
- 1939 – Kim Weston, American soul singer
- 1942 – Rana Bhagwandas, Pakistani lawyer and judge, Chief Justice of Pakistan (died 2015)
- 1942 – Bob Hayes, American sprinter and football player (died 2002)
- 1942 – Jean-Claude Trichet, French banker and economist
- 1942 – Roger Woodward, Australian classical pianist, composer, conductor, teacher and human rights activist.
- 1944 – Ray Martin, Australian television host and journalist
- 1945 – Peter Criss, American singer-songwriter, drummer, and producer
- 1945 – Sivakant Tiwari, Indian-Singaporean lawyer and author (died 2010)
- 1946 – Uri Geller, Israeli-English magician and psychic
- 1946 – Bill Hosket Jr., American basketball player
- 1946 – Sonny Perdue, American politician, 31st United States Secretary of Agriculture, 81st Governor of Georgia
- 1946 – Dick Wolf, American director, producer, and screenwriter
- 1947 – Gigliola Cinquetti, Italian singer-songwriter
- 1948 – Alan Parsons, English keyboard player and producer
- 1948 – Mitsuko Uchida, Japanese pianist
- 1949 – Soumaïla Cissé, Malian engineer and politician (died 2020)
- 1949 – Cecil Cooper, American baseball player and manager
- 1950 – Arturo Márquez, Mexican-American composer
- 1951 – Nuala O'Loan, Baroness O'Loan, Northern Irish academic and police ombudsman
- 1951 – Marta Russell, American author and activist (died 2013)
- 1952 – Jenny Agutter, English actress
- 1954 – Michael Badalucco, American actor
- 1954 – Sandra Cisneros, American author and poet
- 1955 – Martin Schulz, German politician
- 1955 – Binali Yıldırım, Turkish lawyer and politician, Turkish Minister of Transport
- 1956 – Mohamed Ould Abdel Aziz, Mauritanian general and politician, President of Mauritania
- 1956 – Guy Babylon, American keyboard player and songwriter (died 2009)
- 1956 – Blanche Baker, American actress and screenwriter
- 1956 – Junji Hirata, Japanese wrestler
- 1956 – Andrew Mackenzie, Scottish geologist and businessman
- 1956 – Anita Ward, American disco/R&B singer
- 1957 – Billy Bragg, English singer-songwriter and guitarist
- 1957 – Anna Vissi, Cypriot singer-songwriter and actress
- 1957 – Mike Watt, American singer-songwriter and bass player
- 1958 – Doug Nordquist, American high jumper
- 1958 – James Thomson, American biologist and academic
- 1959 – George Coupland, Scottish scientist
- 1959 – Hildegard Körner, German runner
- 1959 – Kazimierz Marcinkiewicz, Polish physicist and politician, 12th Prime Minister of Poland
- 1960 – Nalo Hopkinson, Jamaican-Canadian author and educator
- 1960 – Kim Ki-duk, South Korean director, producer, and screenwriter (died 2020)
- 1961 – Mohammad Fouad, Egyptian singer-songwriter and actor
- 1963 – Joel Gretsch, American actor
- 1966 – Veronica Pershina, Russian-American figure skater and coach
- 1966 – Chris Robinson, American singer-songwriter and guitarist
- 1968 – Karl Wendlinger, Austrian racing driver
- 1969 – Alain de Botton, Swiss-English philosopher and author
- 1969 – Zahra Ouaziz, Moroccan runner
- 1970 – Nicole de Boer, Canadian actress
- 1970 – Grant Flower, Zimbabwean cricketer and coach
- 1970 – Jörg Schmidt, German footballer
- 1972 – Jan Čaloun, Czech ice hockey player
- 1972 – Anders Odden, Norwegian guitarist, songwriter, and producer
- 1974 – Die, Japanese guitarist, songwriter, and producer
- 1975 – Bartosz Bosacki, Polish footballer
- 1976 – Nenad Vučković, Croatian footballer
- 1978 – Yoon Kye-sang, South Korean singer
- 1978 – Andrei Markov, Russian-Canadian ice hockey player
- 1978 – Geremi Njitap, Cameroon footballer
- 1978 – Bouabdellah Tahri, French runner
- 1979 – Michael Rogers, Australian cyclist
- 1980 – Israel Castro, Mexican footballer
- 1980 – Ashley Cole, English footballer
- 1980 – Anthony da Silva, French-Portuguese footballer
- 1980 – Martín Demichelis, Argentine footballer
- 1981 – Royal Ivey, American basketball player and coach
- 1981 – James Shields, American baseball player
- 1982 – Mohammad Asif, Pakistani cricketer
- 1982 – David Cook, American singer-songwriter
- 1982 – Kasper Klausen, Danish footballer
- 1982 – David Wright, American baseball player
- 1983 – Jonah Hill, American actor, producer, and screenwriter
- 1984 – Bob Morley, Australian actor
- 1984 – David Tavaré, Spanish singer and DJ
- 1986 – Chay Genoway, Canadian ice hockey player
- 1987 – Malcolm Jenkins, American football player
- 1990 – JoJo, American singer and actress
- 1990 – Marta Xargay, Spanish basketball player
- 1991 – Rachael Boyle, Scottish footballer
- 1991 – Jorginho, Brazilian footballer
- 1991 – Jillian Rose Reed, American actress
- 1991 – Fabian Schär, Swiss footballer
- 1992 – Ksenia Makarova, Russian-American figure skater
- 1993 – Andrea Belotti, Italian footballer
- 1993 – Robeisy Ramírez, Cuban boxer
- 1994 – Calvin Ridley, American football player
- 1995 – Anžejs Pasečņiks, Latvian basketball player
- 1996 – Jarrod Bowen, English football player
- 1997 – De'Aaron Fox, American basketball player
- 1997 – Suzuka Nakamoto, Japanese singer
- 1998 – Kylian Mbappé, French footballer
- 2000 – Gaboro, Assyrian Swedish rapper and songwriter (died 2024)
- 2001 – Facundo Pellistri, Uruguayan footballer
- 2007 – Gavin McKenna, Canadian ice hockey player

== Deaths ==
=== Pre-1600 ===
- 69 – Titus Flavius Sabinus, a Roman politician and soldier
- 217 – Zephyrinus, pope of the Catholic Church
- 910 – Alfonso III, king of Asturias
- 977 – Fujiwara no Kanemichi, Japanese statesman (born 925)
- 1295 – Margaret of Provence, French queen (born 1221)
- 1326 – Peter of Moscow, Russian metropolitan bishop
- 1340 – John I, duke of Bavaria (born 1329)
- 1355 – Stefan Dušan, emperor of Serbia (born 1308)
- 1539 – Johannes Lupi, Flemish composer (born 1506)
- 1552 – Katharina von Bora, wife of Martin Luther (born 1499)
- 1590 – Ambroise Paré, French physician and surgeon (born 1510)

=== 1601–1900 ===
- 1658 – Jean Jannon, French designer and typefounder (born 1580)
- 1722 – Kangxi, emperor of the Qing Dynasty (born 1654)
- 1723 – Augustus Quirinus Rivinus, German physician and botanist (born 1652)
- 1740 – Richard Boyle, 2nd Viscount Shannon, English field marshal and politician, Governor of Portsmouth (born 1675)
- 1765 – Louis-Ferdinand, Dauphin of France (born 1729)
- 1768 – Carlo Innocenzo Frugoni, Italian poet and academic (born 1692)
- 1783 – Antonio Soler, Spanish priest and composer (born 1729)
- 1812 – Sacagawea, American explorer (born 1788)
- 1820 – John Bell, American farmer (born 1750)
- 1849 – Kyai Maja, Javanese ulama and commander of Java War (born 1792)
- 1856 – Francesco Bentivegna, Italian activist (born 1820)
- 1862 – Robert Knox, Scottish surgeon and zoologist (born 1791)
- 1880 – Gaspar Tochman, Polish-American colonel and lawyer (born 1797)
- 1889 – George F. Durand, Canadian architect (born 1850)
- 1893 – George C. Magoun, American businessman (born 1840)

=== 1901–present ===
- 1915 – Upendrakishore Ray, Indian painter and composer (born 1863)
- 1916 – Arthur Morgan, Australian politician, 16th Premier of Queensland (born 1856)
- 1917 – Lucien Petit-Breton, French-Argentinian cyclist (born 1882)
- 1919 – Philip Fysh, English-Australian politician, 12th Premier of Tasmania (born 1835)
- 1920 – Linton Hope, English sailor and architect (born 1863)
- 1921 – Julius Richard Petri, German microbiologist (born 1852)
- 1925 – João Ferreira Sardo, the founder of Gafanha da Nazaré, also known as Prior Sardo (born 1873).
- 1927 – Frederick Semple, American golfer and tennis player (born 1872)
- 1929 – Émile Loubet, French lawyer and politician, 8th President of France (born 1838)
- 1935 – Martin O'Meara, Irish-Australian sergeant, Victoria Cross recipient (born 1882)
- 1937 – Erich Ludendorff, German general (born 1865)
- 1938 – Annie Armstrong, American missionary (born 1850)
- 1938 – Lida Howell, American archer (born 1859)
- 1939 – Hans Langsdorff, German captain (born 1894)
- 1940 – Sarita Colonia, Peruvian folk saint (born 1914)
- 1941 – Igor Severyanin, Russian-Estonian poet and author (born 1887)
- 1950 – Enrico Mizzi, Maltese lawyer and politician, 6th Prime Minister of Malta (born 1885)
- 1954 – James Hilton, English-American author and screenwriter (born 1900)
- 1956 – Ramón Carrillo, Argentinian neurologist and physician (born 1906)
- 1959 – Juhan Simm, Estonian composer and conductor (born 1885)
- 1961 – Moss Hart, American director and playwright (born 1904)
- 1961 – Earle Page, Australian soldier and politician, 11th Prime Minister of Australia (born 1880)
- 1968 – John Steinbeck, American novelist and short story writer, Nobel Prize laureate (born 1902)
- 1971 – Roy O. Disney, American banker and businessman, co-founded The Walt Disney Company (born 1893)
- 1972 – Adolfo Orsi, Italian businessman (born 1888)
- 1973 – Luis Carrero Blanco, Spanish admiral and politician, 69th President of the Government of Spain (born 1904; assassinated)
- 1973 – Bobby Darin, American singer-songwriter and actor (born 1936)
- 1974 – Rajani Palme Dutt, English journalist and politician (born 1896)
- 1974 – André Jolivet, French composer and conductor (born 1905)
- 1976 – Richard J. Daley, American lawyer and politician, 48th Mayor of Chicago (born 1902)
- 1976 – Soetardjo Kartohadikusumo, Indonesian politician, 1st Governor of West Java (born 1890)
- 1981 – Dimitris Rontiris, Greek actor and director (born 1899)
- 1982 – Arthur Rubinstein, Polish-American pianist and composer (born 1887)
- 1984 – Stanley Milgram, American psychologist and academic (born 1933)
- 1984 – Dmitry Ustinov, Minister of Defence of the Soviet Union (1976–84) (born 1908)
- 1986 – Joe DeSa, American baseball player (born 1959)
- 1991 – Simone Beck, French chef and author (born 1904)
- 1991 – Sam Rabin, English wrestler, singer, and sculptor (born 1903)
- 1991 – Albert Van Vlierberghe, Belgian cyclist (born 1942)
- 1993 – W. Edwards Deming, American statistician, author, and academic (born 1900)
- 1993 – Nazife Güran, Turkish composer and educator (born 1921)
- 1994 – Dean Rusk, American lawyer, and politician, 54th United States Secretary of State (born 1909)
- 1995 – Madge Sinclair, Jamaican-American actress (born 1938)
- 1996 – Carl Sagan, American astronomer, astrophysicist, and cosmologist (born 1934)
- 1997 – Denise Levertov, English-American poet and translator (born 1923)
- 1997 – Dick Spooner, English cricketer (born 1919)
- 1997 – Dawn Steel, American film producer (born 1946)
- 1998 – Alan Lloyd Hodgkin, English physiologist and biophysicist, Nobel Prize laureate (born 1916)
- 1999 – Riccardo Freda, Egyptian-Italian director and screenwriter (born 1909)
- 1999 – Hank Snow, Canadian-American singer-songwriter and guitarist (born 1914)
- 2001 – Léopold Sédar Senghor, Senegalese poet and politician, 1st President of Senegal (born 1906)
- 2005 – Raoul Bott, Hungarian-American mathematician and academic (born 1923)
- 2006 – Anne Rogers Clark, American dog breeder and trainer (born 1929)
- 2008 – Adrian Mitchell, English author, poet, and playwright (born 1932)
- 2008 – Robert Mulligan, American director and producer (born 1925)
- 2008 – Igor Troubetzkoy, Russian aristocrat and racing driver (born 1912)
- 2009 – Brittany Murphy, American actress and singer (born 1977)
- 2009 – Arnold Stang, American actor (born 1918)
- 2010 – K. P. Ratnam, Sri Lankan academic and politician (born 1914)
- 2011 – Barry Reckord, Jamaican playwright and screenwriter (born 1926)
- 2012 – Stan Charlton, English footballer and manager (born 1929)
- 2012 – Robert Juniper, Australian painter and sculptor (born 1929)
- 2012 – Victor Merzhanov, Russian pianist and educator (born 1919)
- 2013 – Pyotr Bolotnikov, Russian runner (born 1930)
- 2014 – Per-Ingvar Brånemark, Swedish surgeon and academic (born 1929)
- 2014 – John Freeman, English lawyer, politician, and diplomat, British Ambassador to the United States (born 1915)
- 2020 – Fanny Waterman, British pianist (born 1920)
- 2020 – Ezra Vogel, American sociologist (born 1930)
- 2022 – Franco Harris, American football player (born 1950)
- 2024 – Casey Chaos, American singer (born 1965)
- 2024 – George Eastham, English footballer (born 1936)
- 2024 – Rickey Henderson, American baseball player (born 1958)

== Holidays and observances ==
- Abolition of Slavery Day, also known as Fête des Cafres (Réunion, French Guiana)
- Bo Aung Kyaw Day (Myanmar)
- Christian feast day:
  - Dominic of Silos
  - Blessed Michał Piaszczyński
  - O Clavis
  - Philogonius
  - Ursicinus of Saint-Ursanne
  - Katharina von Bora (Lutheran)
  - December 20 (Eastern Orthodox liturgics)
- Earliest date for Winter solstice's eve (Northern Hemisphere), and its related observances:
  - Yaldā (Iran)
- International Human Solidarity Day (International)
- Macau Special Administrative Region Establishment Day (Macau)
