= Marcel Douzima =

Central African politician and teacher

Minister of Justice
- In office 11 January 1964 – 1 January 1966
- President: David Dacko
- Preceded by: Antoine Guimali
- Succeeded by: Jean-Bédel Bokassa

Minister of Information and Tourism
- In office 2 January 1963 – 11 January 1964
- President: David Dacko

Minister of Public Service and Planning
- In office 2 January 1961 – 2 January 1963
- President: David Dacko
- Preceded by: Himself (as Minister of Public Service)

Minister of Public Service
- In office 20 June 1960 – 2 January 1961
- President: David Dacko

Minister of Public Works, Transport, and Mines
- In office 1 May 1959 – 20 June 1960
- Prime Minister: David Dacko

Minister of Agriculture, Livestock, Water, and Forestry
- In office 23 August 1958 – 1 May 1959
- Prime Minister: Barthélemy Boganda; Abel Goumba

Minister of Labor
- In office 4 June 1958 – 23 August 1958
- Prime Minister: Barthélemy Boganda
- Preceded by: Honoré Roland Willickond

Personal details
- Born: 20 December 1926 Bali, Batangafo, Ubangi-Shari (now the Central African Republic)
- Died: 2 February 2012 (aged 85) Bangui, Central African Republic
- Party: MESAN
- Occupation: Politician; Teacher

Marcel Douzima (20 December 1926 - 2 February 2012) was a Central African politician and teacher who served in various ministerial positions under the David Dacko Presidency.

== Early life and education ==
Belonging to Dagba, Douzima was born in Bali, Batangafo on 20 December 1926. He completed his primary education in February 1944 in a catholic school in Bangui.

== Career (1944 - 1966) ==
=== Education ===
Upon finishing his education, he worked as a teacher starting in April 1944. He taught at a catholic school in Bambari, Bangui, and Ippy. He joined the scouts in 1950.

=== Politics ===
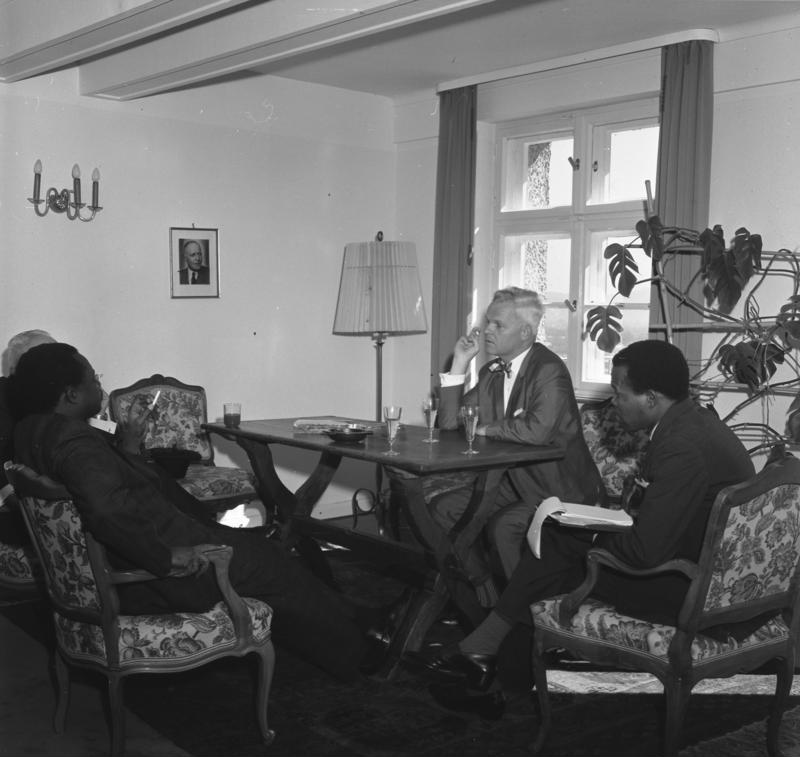
Douzima met Ewald Bucher in Bonn on 24 September 1964

Douzima joined MESAN party and became its secretary-general. He was elected as a member of the Bangui City Council on 18 November 1956 on the Overseas France Municipal Election, representing the MESAN party. In 1957 election, he was elected as a member of the Territorial Assembly representing Ouham District. Two years later, on 5 April 1959, he was reelected as a member of the Territorial Assembly at the legislative election.

Boganda appointed Douzima as a Minister of Labor on 4 June 1958, a position that he served for one month. He was then appointed as the Minister of Agriculture, Livestock, Water, and Forestry on 23 August 1958. On 1 May 1959, Dacko named Douzima as a Minister of Public Works, Transport, and Mines. He later served as the Minister of Public Service on 20 June 1960. Within the cabinet, he was part of the educated and literate group.

Dacko appointed Douzima as the Minister of Public Service and Planning on 2 January 1961, a position that he served for two years. Afterwards, he became the Minister of Information and Tourism on 2 June 1963. Subsequently, he served as the Minister of Justice for almost two years. While serving as a minister of justice, he also became the Chairman of the Transequatorial Communications Agency and representative of the Central African Republic at the 2nd Summit of the Non-Aligned Movement in Cairo. At the 2nd Summit of the Non-Aligned Movement, he called for total disarmament as he believed that it would lead to coexistence.

== Arrest ==
After the Saint-Sylvestre coup d'état, Bokassa arrested Douzima on 13 January 1966 and imprisoned him in Birao cell at the Ngaragba Prison. Banza later interrogated Douzima and forced him to admit the confession that he had a Swiss Bank Account. During the interrogation, he was tortured and subsequently transferred to the Safari cell around 25 January.

During Douzima's first three days in Safari Cell, he did not receive any food or drink, causing him to fall into a coma. Realizing that he was in a coma, the prisoners brought him to Golowaka cell and washed him. When the prisoners were washing him, he regained little consciousness and once heard a voice from someone. Upon finishing the washing, he lost his consciousness and was put in an isolation cell. A few hours later, he awoke from a coma and was then placed in Golowaka cell.

On 13 October 1969, Douzima, along with Charles Bornou, Simon Samba, and Léopold Ismael Samba, was invited by Bokassa to Renaissance Palace. They arrived at the palace at 11 PM and Bokassa freed them from prison. Meanwhile, Bokassa blamed Banza for their imprisonment.

== Post-Arrest and Death ==
Upon Douzima's release from prison, Bokassa appointed him as a secretary-general at the presidency on 2 August 1974. In December 1976, he served as the secretary-general of the imperial court in Berengo. Douzima died on 2 February 2012 in Bangui.

== Personal life ==
Douzima was married.

== Awards ==
- , Commander Order of Central African Merit.

== Bibliography ==
- Baccard, André (1987). Les Martyrs de Bokassa. Paris: Editions du Seuil.
- Bradshaw, Richard; Rius, Juan Fandos (2016). Historical Dictionary of the Central African Republic (Historical Dictionaries of Africa). Lanham: Rowman & Littlefield.
