= Charles Bornou =

Central African politician (born c. 1914)

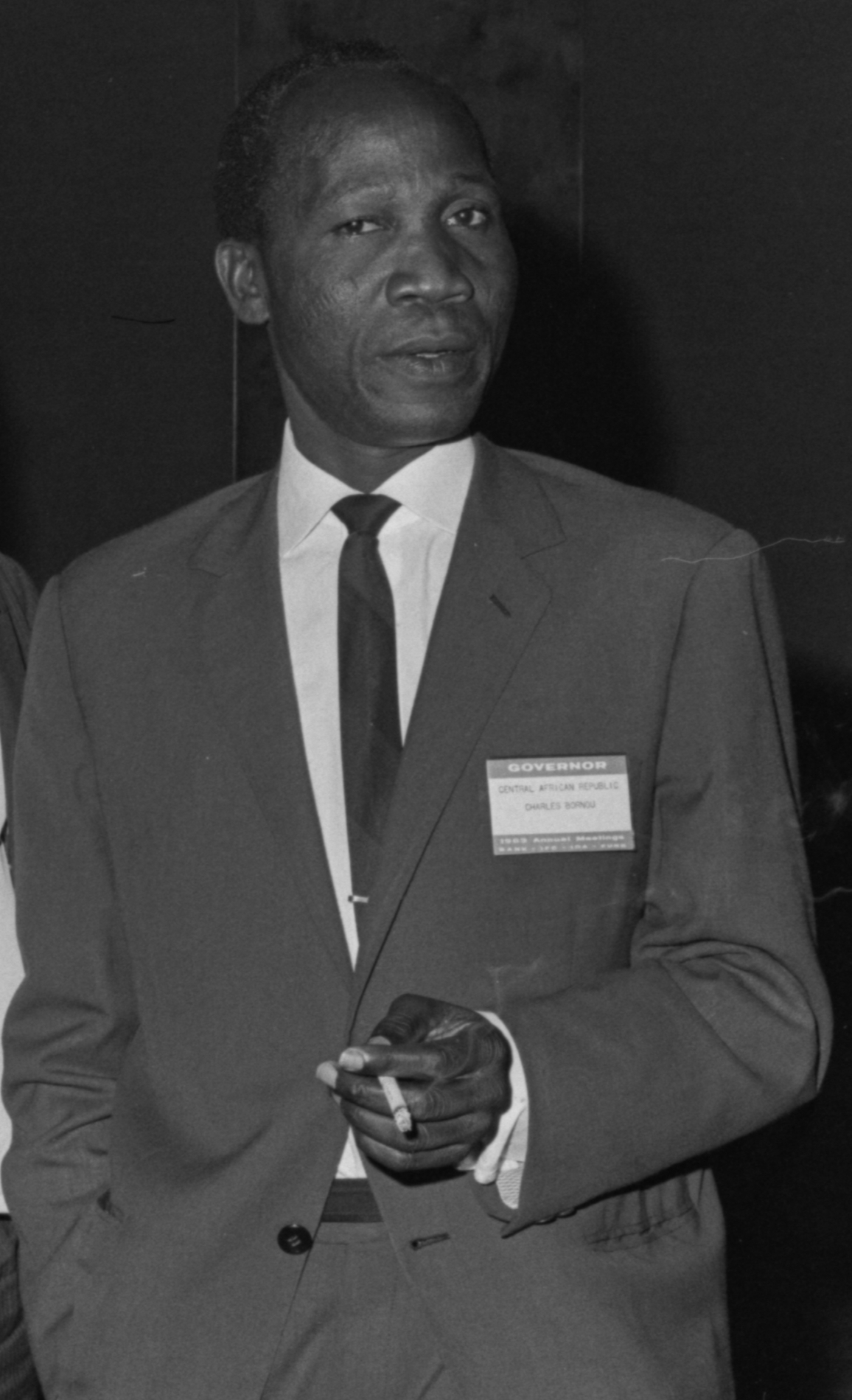
- Bornou in 1963

Minister of Finance
- In office 4 April 1962 – 1 January 1966
- President: David Dacko
- Preceded by: Albert Payao
- Succeeded by: Alexandre Banza

Mayor of Bangui
- In office 1962 – 1 January 1966
- President: David Dacko
- Preceded by: Étienne Ngounio
- Succeeded by: Etienne Pamala-Sambonga

Minister of Agriculture, Water and Forestry, Hunting, and Tourism
- In office 3 August 1961 – 4 April 1962
- President: David Dacko

Prefect of Ouaka
- In office 23 January 1961 – 24 July 1961
- President: David Dacko
- Preceded by: Himself (as Chief of Ouaka Region)
- Succeeded by: Barthélemy Paul Zinga-Piroua

Chief of Ouaka Region
- In office 21 December 1960 – 23 January 1961
- President: David Dacko
- Preceded by: Maurice Bourgine
- Succeeded by: Himself (as Prefect of Ouaka)
Chief posts
Chief of Dekoa District
In office 26 April 1960 – 21 December 1960
Preceded by	Paul François Jean Quelen
Succeeded by	Marcel Yakathe
In office 22 July 1959 – ?
Preceded by	Paul François Jean Quelen
Succeeded by	Paul François Jean Quelen
Chief of Fort-Crampel District
In office 22 July 1959 – 29 December 1959
Preceded by	Paul François Jean Quelen
Succeeded by	Eric Ernest André Romain Bruneton

Personal details
- Born: c. 1914 Doumoungou, N'Délé, Ubangi-Shari (now the Central African Republic)
- Party: MESAN
- Occupation: Politician; Accountant; Clerk

Charles Christophe Bornou (c. 1914 – ?) was a Central African politician, accountant, and clerk.

== Early life and education ==
Bornou was born c. 1914 in Doumoungou, N'Délé, to Doumoungou and Ganepou. His father was a soldier who served for Dar al Kuti. He enrolled at École urbaine in Bangui from 1926 to 1931. While working at the finance department, he participated in the training and courses program for the Ubangi Shari civil servants and received the diploma in 1949.

== Career ==
=== French Equatorial Africa Civil Service ===
Bornou was accepted at the French Equatorial Africa (FEA) civil service in 1931, working as an interpreter for the Ubangi-Shari governor's cabinet in Bangui. Later, he worked at two different places, which were Mobaye (1932–1934) and Berberati (1934–1938). On 1 December 1938, he moved to Bangui and was placed at the real estate department. Less than a year later, on 29 April 1939, he worked again for the governor's cabinet in Bangui and then in Fort-Crampel on 31 May. Two years later, he moved to Bangui on 19 December 1941 and was reassigned to the real estate department.

Bornou switched his job to an accountant on 5 October 1942. Later, he was placed at Fort-Crampel and became a court clerk on 26 September 1942. From 1948 to 1952, he worked at the governor's finance department. Meanwhile, he also became the president of the cultural association in Bangui in 1948 and once ran as a candidate for councilor representing Upper Kotto-Ndele-Birao district from the Movement for the Social Evolution of Black Africa (MESAN) on the 1952 election where he was defeated by Paul Issa Mazengue.

In 1953, Bornou was posted at Upper Sangha as a finance and postal agent and designated as the Secretary of the Indigenous Provident Society in Bamara. Two years later, he served as the Secretary of the Indigenous Provident Society in Nola.

The Colonial government designated Bornou as a financial agent in Dekoa in 1958. On 22 July 1959, he was appointed as a chief in two different districts, Dekoa (1959–1960) and Fort-Crampel (1959).

=== Central African Republic Government ===
When the Central African Republic declared its independence from France on 14 August 1960, Bornou served as the Chief of the Dekoa District. On 21 December 1960, he was appointed as the Head of Ouaka for one year with two different titles: chief (21 December 1960 – 23 January 1961) and prefect (23 January 1961 – 24 July 1961).

Dacko named Bornou as the Minister of Agriculture, water and forestry, hunting, and tourism on 3 August 1961, a position that he served until 4 April 1962. He was later appointed as Minister of Finance on 4 April 1962 and served in that position until 1 January 1966. When he served as Minister of Finance, he also became Mayor of Bangui (1962–1966) and was designated as the managing committee of MESAN. Furthermore, he also participated in the Conference on the establishment of the African Development Bank.

During the Saint-Sylvestre coup d'état, a group of soldiers led by Auguste Mbongo arrested Bornou at his house on 1 January 1966 and jailed him at Ngaragba Central Prison. On 13 October 1969, Bokassa invited Bornou, Marcel Douzima, Simon Samba, Léopold Ismael Samba to Renaissance Palace and they went to the place on the same day. Arriving at the palace, Bokassa pardoned them and blamed Banza for their imprisonment. He also told Bornou that he was imprisoned due to his position as a finance minister.

Upon Bornou's release from prison on 13 October 1969, he was reassigned to the civil service. He retired from work on 1 January 1972.

== Death and personal life ==
He died on an unknown date and year. His nephew, Gaston Bartoume-Moussa, worked as a doctor.

== Awards ==
- , Knight Order of the Black Star.
- , Knight Order of Central African Merit.
- Officer Agricultural Merit (23 April 1963).

== Bibliography ==
- Baccard, André (1987). Les Martyrs de Bokassa. Paris: Editions du Seuil.
- Bradshaw, Richard; Rius, Juan Fandos (2016). Historical Dictionary of the Central African Republic (Historical Dictionaries of Africa). Lanham: Rowman & Littlefield.
- Serre, Jacques; Fandos-Rius, Juan (2014). Répertoire de l'administration territoriale de la République centrafricaine. Paris: L’Harmattan. ISBN 978-2-343-01298-8.
