= Bornou =

Bornou could refer to:

- Charles Bornou (c. 1914–???), Central African Republic politician
- Kanem–Bornu Empire, historical empire in North and Central Africa
