= Théodore Dabanga =

Central African banker and economist

Minister of Finance and Budget
- In office 19 June 2005 – 2 September 2006
- President: François Bozizé
- Prime Minister: Élie Doté
- Preceded by: Daniel Nditiféï Boyssembè
- Succeeded by: Sylvain Ndoutingai

Personal details
- Born: 25 October 1956 (age 69) Yaloke, Ubangi-Shari (now the present-day Central African Republic)
- Party: National Convention; Kwa Na Kwa
- Occupation: Banker; Economist

Théodore Dabanga (born 25 October 1956) is a Central African banker and economist who served as Minister of Finance and Budget during Bozize's administration.

== Early life and education ==
Belonging to Gbaya, Dabanga was born in Yaloke on 25 October 1956. He studied economy in Bordeaux and banking in Abidjan in 1983.

== Career ==
Dabanga commenced his career by joining the finance department of the International Bank for West Africa (BIAC) Bangui Branch in 1983. In 1988, he worked at the Central African Pharmaceutical Office (OPC) for three years. Subsequently, he moved to the Central African Cigarette Company (SOCACIG) in 1991.

Patassé appointed Dabanga as head of the Standing Technical Committee for Monitoring Structural Adjustment Programs (CTPPAS). On 15 January 1999, he was appointed as Deputy Minister of Finance and served until 5 April 2001. Afterward, he became the director general of Commercial Bank Centrafrique (CBCA) on 20 April 2001, replacing Etienne Djimarim. While serving as CBCA's director general, he also worked as chairman of the Central African Textile Development Company (SOCADETEX) from 2001 to 2004 and the African Fund for Guarantee and Economic Cooperation (FAGACE) from 2002 to 2004.

In 2004, he got involved in the establishment of the National Convergence "Kwa Na Kwa" and supported Bozize during the 2005 Central African general election. He then served as the Minister of Finance and Budget from 19 June 2005 to 2 September 2006 and Central African Republic's representative on the International Monetary Fund (IMF) board of governors. When he served as the minister, he promised to restructure public finances by taking "courageous measures" due to the monthly budget deficit. Furthermore, he also became the witness for Simon Kouloumba's trial in the Libyan Oil Case.

Upon resigning from the ministerial position, he worked as Bozize's financial adviser from 2006 to 2008 and then as Director of General Control at the Bank of Central African States (BEAC) from July 2008 until his dismissal on 7 June 2010 as a result of BEAC's meeting in Brazzaville. While serving as managing director, he led the complementary audit mission to Paris to investigate alleged BEAC's fund embezzlement.

== Bibliography ==
- Bradshaw, Richard; Rius, Juan Fandos (2016). Historical Dictionary of the Central African Republic (Historical Dictionaries of Africa). Lanham: Rowman & Littlefield.
