= François Gon =

Vice Prime Minister of Energy, Mining, Public Services, and Social Security
- In office 4 September 1976 – December 1977
- President: Jean-Bédel Bokassa
- Succeeded by
Ministerial posts
Minister of Energy and Mining
In office 7 June 1976 – 4 September 1976
| President | Jean-Bédel Bokassa |
| Preceded by | Himself (as Minister of Energy) |
Minister of Energy
In office 2 September 1974 – 7 June 1976
| President | Jean-Bédel Bokassa |
Deputy Minister of National Defense, Ex-servicemen and War Victims, and Energy
In office 15 June 1974 – 2 September 1974
| President | Jean-Bédel Bokassa |
| Preceded by | Himself (as Deputy Minister of National Defense and Energy) |
Deputy Minister of National Defense and Energy
In office 15 February 1974 – 15 June 1974
| President | Jean-Bédel Bokassa |
| Preceded by | Himself (as Deputy Minister of National Defense) |
Deputy Minister of National Defense
In office 6 April 1973 – 15 February 1974
| President | Jean-Bédel Bokassa |
Minister of Justice and Labor
In office 14 July 1972 – 6 April 1973
| President | Jean-Bédel Bokassa |
| Preceded by | Himself (as Minister of Justice) |
| Succeeded by | Clément N'Gai Voueto |
Minister of Justice
In office 13 May 1972 – 14 July 1972
| President | Jean-Bédel Bokassa |
| Preceded by | Louis Pierre Gamba |
| Succeeded by | Himself (as Minister of Justice and Labor) |
In office 28 February 1969 – 4 February 1970
| President | Jean-Bédel Bokassa |
| Preceded by | André Dieudonné Magale |
| Succeeded by | Antoine Guimali |
Deputy Minister of Industry and Trade
In office 29 December 1971 – 13 May 1972
| President | Jean-Bédel Bokassa |
Minister of Finance
In office 4 February 1970 – 29 December 1971
| President | Jean-Bédel Bokassa |
| Preceded by | Antoine Guimali |
| Succeeded by | Enoch Dérant Lakoué |

Personal details
- Born: 1937 Carnot, Ubangi-Shari (now the Central African Republic)
- Died: November 1993 (aged 55–56) Bangui, Central African Republic
- Education: IHEOM; ENM
- Occupation: Politician; Judge

François Valentin Gon (1937 – November 1993) was a Central African politician and judge.

== Biography ==
Belonging to Ngbaka, Gon was born in Carnot in 1937. He enrolled in IHEOM for five years (1956–1961) and École nationale de la Magistrature for five years (1961–1966).

Upon returning to the Central African Republic, Bokassa assigned Gon as chairman of the Supreme Court. On 28 February 1969, Gon served as Minister of Justice, replacing André Dieudonné Magale. When he served as the Minister of Justice, his name was on the list of persons who assisted Alexandre Banza during the 1969 coup attempt, along with Joseph Kallot, François Péhoua, Timothée Malendoma, and Auguste Mbongo. They went to Bokassa asking for forgiveness and he accepted it except for Kallot. He subsequently worked as Minister of Finance on 4 February 1970. As a minister of finance, he represented the Central African Republic on the board of the African Development Bank. Afterwards, he became the Deputy Minister of Industry and Trade on 29 December 1971, a position that he served for less than a year. Bokassa reappointed Gon as Minister of Justice on 13 May 1972 and then as Minister of Justice and Labor on 14 July 1972.

Gon stepped down as Minister of Justice and Labor on 6 April 1973. He subsequently served in various ministerial and deputy ministerial positions which were Deputy Minister of National Defense (6 April 1973 – 15 February 1974), Deputy of National Defense and Energy (15 February 1974 – 15 June 1974), Deputy Minister of National Defense, ex-servicemen and war victims, and energy (15 June 1974 – 2 September 1974), Minister of Energy (2 September 1974 – 7 June 1976), and Minister of Energy and Mining (7 June 1976 – 4 September 1976).

After Bokassa established the Central African Revolutionary Council, Gon was employed as the Vice Prime Minister of Energy, Mining, Public Services, and Social Security. He later served as the Chairman of the Economic and Social Council from December 1977 to 1978. He died in Bangui in November 1993.

== Works ==
- Gon, François (1969). "L'organisation de la justice administrative en République Centrafricaine". Revue juridique et politique: Indépendance et coopération. 23 (4): 929–936.

== Awards ==
- Commander Central African Orders of Industrial and Artisanal Merit (1 May 1972).
- Operation Bokassa (31 December 1974).
