= Antoine Guimali =

Central African politician, clerk and interpreter

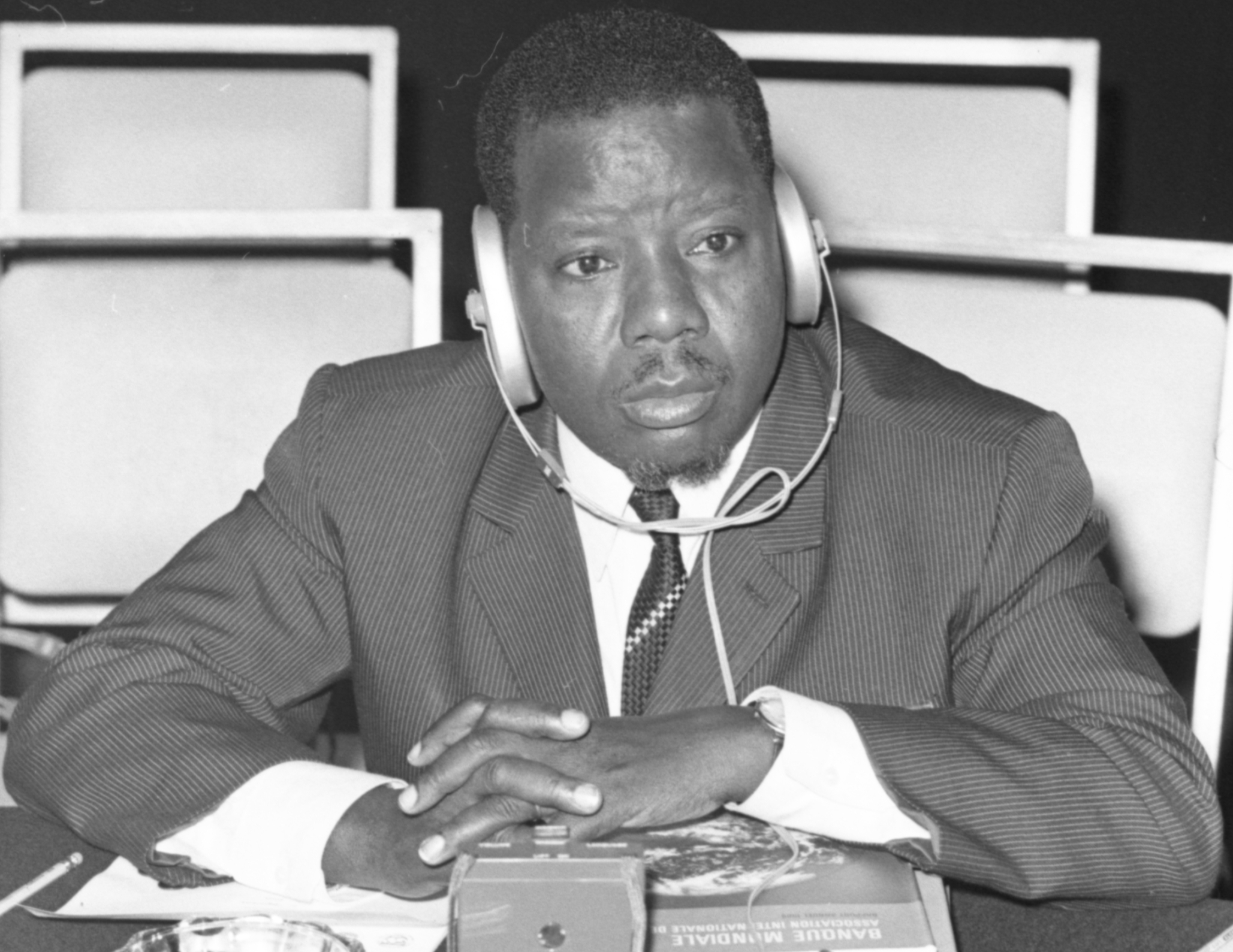
- Guimali in 1969

Minister of Justice
- In office 4 February 1970 – 25 June 1970
- President: Jean-Bédel Bokassa
- Preceded by: François Gon
- Succeeded by: Maurice Gouandjia
- In office 12 January 1967 – 13 February 1968
- President: Jean-Bédel Bokassa
- Preceded by: Jean-Bédel Bokassa
- Succeeded by: André Dieudonné Magale
- In office 2 January 1961 – 11 January 1964
- President: David Dacko
- Succeeded by: Marcel Douzima

Minister of Finance
- In office 13 February 1968 – 4 February 1970
- President: Jean-Bédel Bokassa
- Preceded by: Alexandre Banza
- Succeeded by: François Valentin Gon

Minister of Foreign Affairs
- In office 4 January 1966 – 12 January 1967
- President: Jean-Bédel Bokassa
- Preceded by: Himself
- Succeeded by: Jean-Arthur Bandio
- In office 11 January 1964 – 1 January 1966
- President: David Dacko
- Preceded by: Jean-Christophe Mackpayen
- Succeeded by: Himself

Personal details
- Born: 1918 Yetomane, Ippy, Ubangi-Shari (now the Central African Republic)
- Died: Unknown
- Occupation: Politician; Clerk; Interpreter; Accountant

Antoine Guimali (1918 - unknown) was a Central African politician, clerk, interpreter, and accountant.

== Early life and education ==
Guimali was born in Yetomane, Ippy in 1918 to Michel Gouandjiliou and Marie Bomango. He attended primary education in Ippy (1927) and higher school at École régionale in Bambari (1929).

== Career ==
=== Colonial era ===
Upon finishing his education, Guimali joined the French Equatorial Africa (FEA) civil service on 15 April 1932 and worked as a clerk in the Finance Agent's office in Bambari. He then worked at the Ippy district government's office from October 1932 to September 1933.

Guimali served as an interpreter in Bambari on 27 April 1935. He later became an interpreter at the Alindao district government's office in July 1935. He then moved to Mobaye and worked at the government and finance agent's office. On 1 March 1938, he became an accountant. He then moved to Bangui to work at the Ubangi-Shari governor's cabinet on 4 May 1939. Later, he served as the governor's secretary for three years.

On 1 October 1946, Guimali was appointed as the court clerk. Working as a court clerk, he became a member of the electoral committee for the 1st election of the Ubangi-Shari Representative Council on 15 December 1946. He then moved to Brazzaville to serve as the court clerk on 18 April 1947 and stayed there until 1951. From 1951 to 1959, he lived in Gabon and worked as a clerk and auctioneer in Lambaréné, Mouila, and Port Gentil.

=== Central African Republic ===
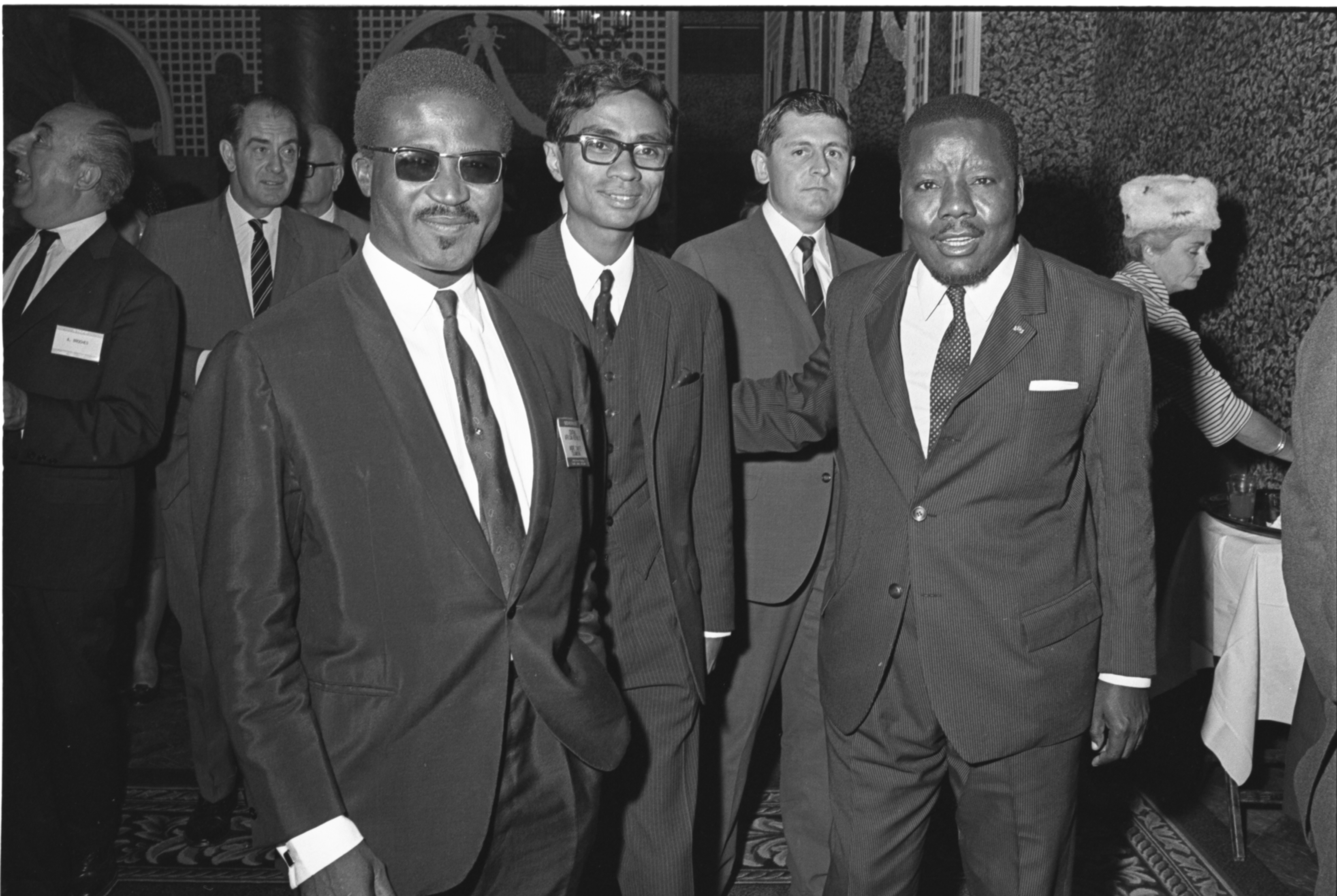
Antoine Guimali (right) during the World Bank Annual Meeting in Washington DC in 1968

Upon the independence of the Central African Republic, Guimali returned home. David Dacko appointed him as the Deputy Minister of Justice on 17 August 1960. His position within the Ministry of Justice was elevated from deputy to minister on 2 January 1961, a position that he served until 11 January 1964. While serving as a minister of justice, he served as the head of the Central African Republic goodwill mission when he went to Guinea in 1962 and was appointed as a Chairman of Constitutional Council.

Dacko named Guimali as a Minister of Foreign Affairs on 11 January 1964. In the Saint-Sylvestre coup d'état, he was arrested on 1 January 1966 by a group of soldiers led by Auguste Mbongo. He was tortured in the back with rifle butts and face by slapping, causing injury to his left eye. In the evening, Bokassa released Guimali along with Dominique Gueret, Jean-Arthur Bandio, Maurice Maïdou, and El Hadj Bouari.

After Guimali's release from brief detention, Bokassa reappointed him as Minister of Foreign Affairs on 4 January 1966. As a minister of foreign affairs, he conveyed the messages to the chargé d'affaires of the People's Republic of China to the Central African Republic, Keng Ying, on the CAR diplomatic break off with the PRC and expulsion of all Chinese nationals in the country within 48 hours in early January 1966. One year later, on 12 January 1967, he served as the Minister of Justice. Meanwhile, he was also designated as a Vice President of the Central African Republic Red Cross Society on 31 March 1967. He then became the Minister of Finance on 13 February 1968 for two years. As a minister of finance, he joined the Board of Directors of Bakouma Uranium Mining Company. On 4 February 1970, he served again as the Minister of Justice.

Bokassa had high trust in Guimali and appointed him to a position equal to the prime minister, vice president responsible for justice, on 25 June 1970. Bokassa then appointed Guimali as the chairman of the Supreme Court on 13 September 1971. He served as the Chairman of the Supreme Court until he decided to retire on 1 February 1974.

== Late life ==
Guimali died in unknown year.

== Awards ==
- , Knight Order of the Black Star.
- , Grand Officer Order of Central African Merit - 1 December 1970.
- Grand Officer Operation Bokassa - 1 December 1970.

== Bibliography ==
- Baccard, André (1987). Les Martyrs de Bokassa. Paris: Editions du Seuil.
- Bradshaw, Richard; Rius, Juan Fandos (2016). Historical Dictionary of the Central African Republic (Historical Dictionaries of Africa). Lanham: Rowman & Littlefield.
