= Jean-Christophe Mackpayen =

Central African politician and teacher

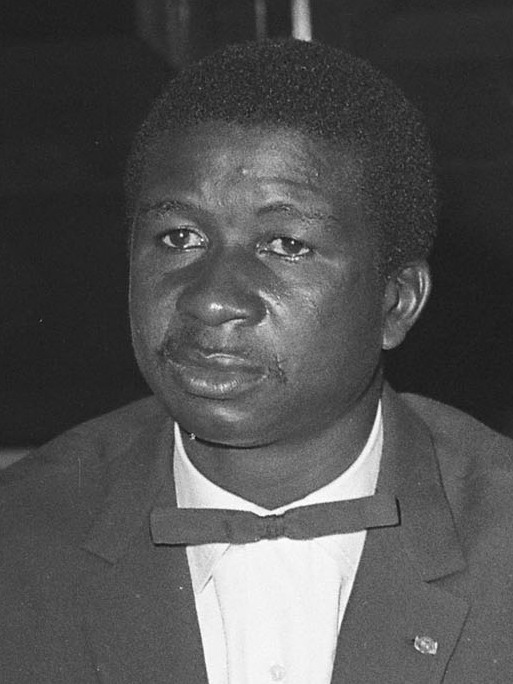
- Mackpayen in 1963

Minister of Information and Tourism
- In office 11 January 1964 – 1 May 1964
- President: David Dacko

Minister of Foreign Affairs
- In office 2 January 1963 – 11 January 1964
- President: David Dacko
- Preceded by: Maurice Dejean
- Succeeded by: Antoine Guimali

Minister of National Education
- In office 2 January 1961 – 2 January 1963
- President: David Dacko
- Preceded by: Himself (as Minister of National Education, Labor, and Social Affaris)
- Succeeded by: Dominique Gueret

Minister of National Education, Labor, and Social Affairs
- In office 20 June 1960 – 2 January 1961
- President: David Dacko

Minister of Public Works
- In office 1 May 1959 – 8 October 1959
- Prime Minister: David Dacko

Personal details
- Born: 11 July 1934 Bangui, Ubangi-Shari (now the Central African Republic)
- Died: 1 July 1981 (aged 46) Bangui, Central African Republic
- Party: MESAN
- Children: 37
- Occupation: Politician; Teacher

Jean-Christophe Mackpayen (11 July 1934 - 1 July 1981) was a Central African politician and teacher.

== Biography ==
=== Early life, education, and teaching career ===
Belonging to Lissongo, Mackpayen was born in Bangui on 11 July 1934. He worked as a teacher in Bangui for four years from 1954 to 1958. While working as a teacher, he also served as Secretary General of the Union of Teachers of Oubangui and later became the President of the Teaching League Section of the Ubangui Branch.

Mackpayen went to France in 1958 and studied at École Normale in Chartres and École Normale Supérieure in Saint-Cloud. Upon finishing his studies in France, he returned to Bangui and worked as an education inspector.

=== Politics ===
Mackpayen joined MESAN in an unknown year. He was elected as an MP in the 1959 election from the MESAN party. He served as an MP from 30 April 1959 to 30 April 1964.

Dacko appointed Mackpayen as a Minister of Public Works on 1 May 1959. He then became a Minister of National Education, Labor, and Social Affairs from 20 June 1960 to 2 January 1961. On 2 January 1961, he became the Minister of National Education, a position that he served for two years before being replaced by Dominique Guéret on 2 January 1963. During his service as Minister of National Education, he headed the Central African Republic Delegation at the 1960 UNESCO General Conference and supported the UNESCO plan for African education development.

Mackpayen then served as the Minister of Foreign Affairs for one year. As a Minister of Foreign Affairs, he attended the first OAU Conference in Addis Ababa in May 1963 and signed a partnership agreement between the EEC and African states. Upon stepping down as Minister of Foreign Affairs, he served as Minister of Information and Tourism from 1 January 1964 to 1 May 1964. Under Bokassa's presidency, he served as the President of the Chamber of Commerce from 25 July 1968 to July 1972.

=== Death ===
Mackpayen died in Bangui on 1 July 1981.

== Awards ==
- , Knight Order of Central African Merit (1 December 1959).

== Bibliography ==
- Bradshaw, Richard; Rius, Juan Fandos (2016). Historical Dictionary of the Central African Republic (Historical Dictionaries of Africa). Lanham: Rowman & Littlefield.
