= Dominique Gueret =

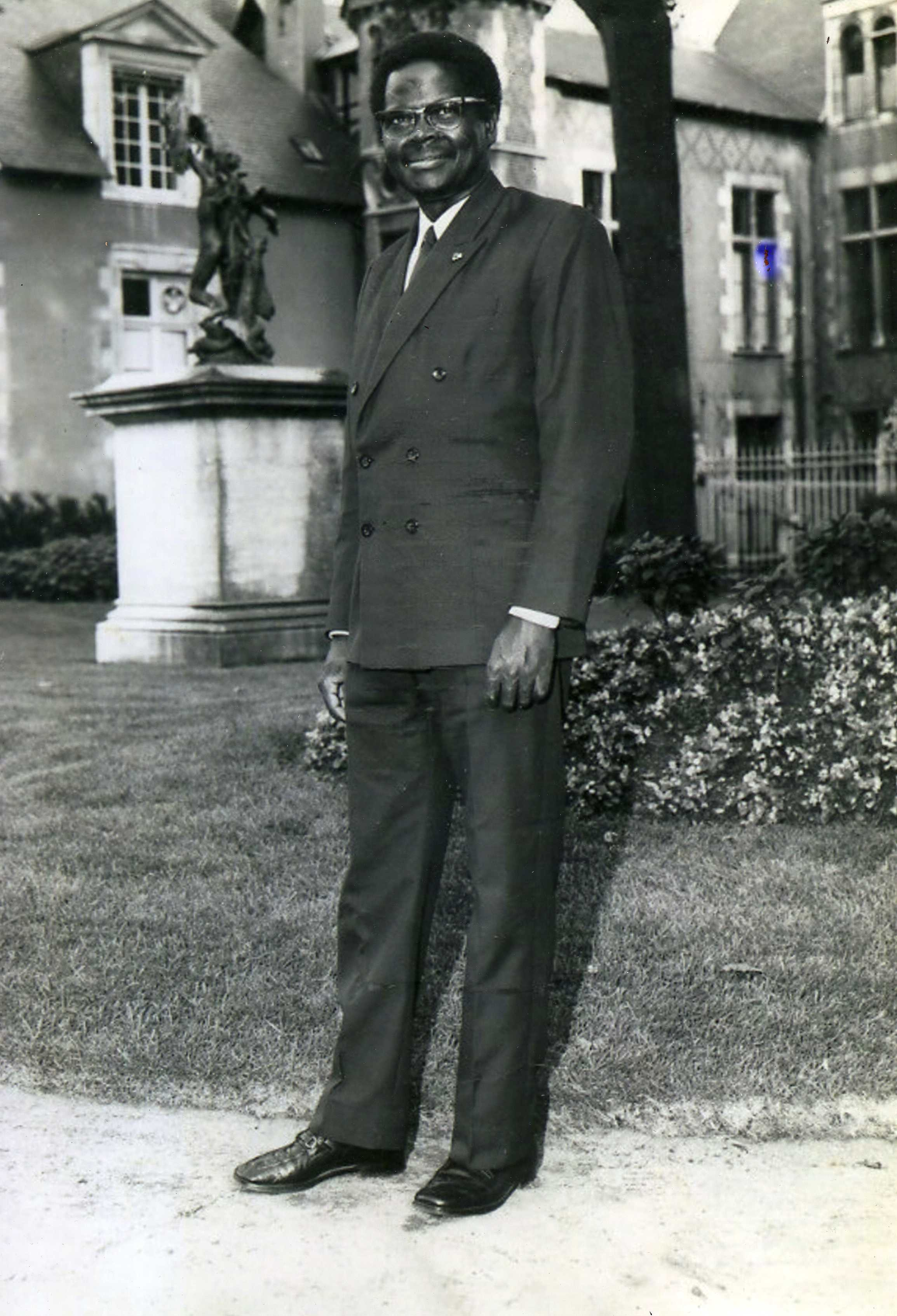

Ministry of National Education, Youth, and Sports
- In office 4 January 1966 – 15 October 1966
- President: Jean-Bédel Bokassa
- Preceded by: Himself
- Succeeded by: Antoine Mbary-Daba
- In office 1 May 1964 – 1 January 1966
- President: David Dacko
- Preceded by: Himself (as Minister of National Education)
- Succeeded by: Himself

Minister of National Education
- In office 2 January 1963 – 1 May 1964
- President: David Dacko
- Preceded by: Jean-Christophe Mackpayen
- Succeeded by: Himself (as Minister of National Education, Youth, and Sports)

Personal details
- Born: 15 September 1930 Alindao, Ubangi-Shari (now the Central African Republic)
- Died: 9 September 2006 (aged 75) Orléans, France
- Occupation: Teacher; Bureaucrat; Politician

Dominique Gueret (15 September 1930 - 9 September 2006) was a Central African teacher, bureaucrat, and politician.

== Early life and education ==
Gueret was born in Alindao on 15 September 1930. He enrolled in École régionale in Bangassou and graduated in 1944. Later, he continued his education at École supérieure indigène in Bangui and finished it in 1947. In 1961, he participated in training at École normale d’instituteurs in Paris.

== Career ==
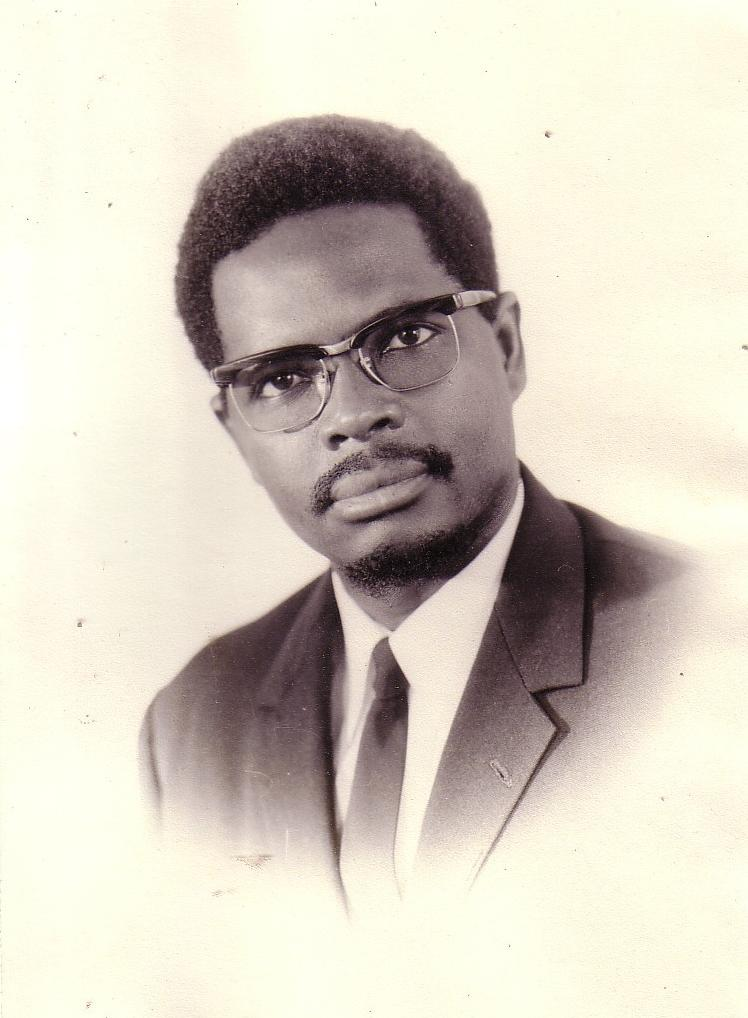
Gueret in unknown year

Gueret became a school teacher and was assigned to Bossangoa in September 1947. Afterward, he moved to Chad and lived there for ten years (1948–1958). During his service in Chad, he taught in several cities such as Bongor, Fianga, Fort Lamy, and Baïbokoum. He returned to Ubangi-Shari in 1959 and served as a school principal in Kembe. The following year, he was appointed Head of the Mobaye Education District.

Upon finishing training in Paris, Gueret served as an education inspector in Bambari in 1962. Dacko named Gueret as Minister of National Education, replacing Jean-Christophe Mackpayen on 2 January 1963. He was then appointed as the Minister of National Education, Youth, and Sports on 1 May 1964. During his first term as minister of education, he founded the National Commission for the Study of the Sango Language (CNELS) on 15 January 1965.

On the Saint-Sylvestre coup d'état, the coup plotters arrested Gueret and brought him to Camp Kassaï. Less than 24 hour, Bokassa and Banza released Gueret and Antoine Guimali. He was then reappointed as the Minister of National Education, Youth, and Sports on 4 January 1966. Less than a year later, Bokassa dismissed him as Minister of National Education because of the low passing rate of the baccalaureate exam in Bangui on 15 October. His position was replaced by Antoine Mbary Daba in January 1967.

After Bokassa fired Gueret from his ministerial position, he fled to Madagascar. Upon arriving in Madagascar, he worked as a teacher. He then worked at UNESCO in Madagascar. Afterwards, he moved to France. When the Bokassa regime was toppled, he returned to the Central African Republic in 1980 and served as an academy inspector.

Gueret died in Orléans on 9 September 2006.

== Bibliography ==
- Bradshaw, Richard; Rius, Juan Fandos (2016). Historical Dictionary of the Central African Republic (Historical Dictionaries of Africa). Lanham: Rowman & Littlefield.
