= Marie-Christine Mboukou =

Central African Republic politician

Minister of Trade and Industry
- In office 14 December 1976 – ?
- President: Jean-Bédel Bokassa

Minister of Finance
- In office 9 June 1975 – 14 December 1976
- President: Jean-Bédel Bokassa
- Preceded by: Alphonse Koyamba
- Succeeded by: Hugues Dobozendi

Deputy Minister of Finance
- In office 2 January 1975 – 9 June 1975
- President: Jean-Bédel Bokassa

Personal details
- Born: 19 April 1942 (age 84) Dede, Lobaye, Ubangi-Shari (now the present-day Central African Republic)
- Education: École nationale d’administration
- Occupation: Customs expert and Financial controller

Marie-Christine Gbokou née Mboukou (also spelled Mbeko; born 19 April 1942) was a Central African Republic politician and civil servant. She was the country's first female minister of finance and served from 9 June 1975 to 14 December 1976.

== Early life and education ==
Marie Christiane Mbeko was born on 19 April 1942 in Dede, Lobaye. She completed her primary education at a catholic primary school in Mbaiki and higher education at École nationale d'administration in 1967. She also studied at École nationale des douanes in Neuilly-sur-Seine.

== Career ==
Upon finishing higher education, Gbokou joined public service on 1 July 1967. Bokassa named her as acting director of the accounting service of the minister of finance on 25 September 1971. Two years later, on 7 December 1973, she served as a customs inspector. Afterwards, she was appointed as the deputy minister of finance on 2 January 1975 and later became the minister of finance on 9 June. While serving as minister of finance, she also served as chairman of the board of governors of the BEAC and became the head of the BEAC delegation at IMF and World Bank meetings in Manila from 4 to 8 October 1976.

Gbokou stepped down as the minister of finance on 14 December 1976 and on the same day, she was appointed as the minister of trade and industry. On 4 February 1977, she became a board member of Central African Cigar Factory (MANUCIG), a position that she served until 3 June 1978. In 1980, she was nominated as the CAR representative at the African Development Bank. Kolingba appointed Gbokou as head of the customs service in July 1988.

== Awards ==
- Knight Orders of Gratitude - 1 December 1970.
- , Officer Order of Central African Merit – 1 December 1959.

== Bibliography ==
- Bradshaw, Richard; Rius, Juan Fandos (2016). Historical Dictionary of the Central African Republic (Historical Dictionaries of Africa). Lanham: Rowman & Littlefield.
- Serre, Jacques; Fandos-Rius, Juan (2014). Répertoire de l'administration territoriale de la République centrafricaine. Paris: L’Harmattan. ISBN 978-2-343-01298-8.

== See also ==
- List of female finance ministers
