= Antoine Mbary-Daba =

Minister of National Education, Youth, Sports, Arts, and Culture
- In office 17 September 1969 – 25 June 1970
- President: Jean-Bédel Bokassa

Minister of Public Service, Labor, and Social Services
- In office 28 February 1969 – 17 September 1969
- President: Jean-Bédel Bokassa

Minister of National Education
- In office 12 January 1967 – 28 February 1969
- President: Jean-Bédel Bokassa
- Preceded by: Dominique Gueret
- Succeeded by
Diplomatic posts
Ambassador of the Central African Republic to the Ivory Coast
In office
1979–1982
Ambassador of the Central African Republic to Japan and South Korea
In office
31 August 1974 – 1979
Ambassador of the Central African Republic to Gabon
In office
1971–1974
Ambassador of the Democratic Republic of the Congo, Burundi, and Rwanda
In office
1970–1971

Personal details
- Born: 20 December 1932 Bangassou, Ubangi-Shari (now the present-day Central African Republic)
- Died: c. 1997 (aged 64-65)

Antoine Mbary-Daba (20 December 1932 - c. 1997) was a Central African politician, bureaucrat, and diplomat.

== Early life and education ==
Belonging to Nzakara, Mbary-Daba was born on 20 December 1932 in Bangassou. He enrolled in primary school in Bangassou in 1946. After finishing primary education, he continued high school in Chambéry in 1956. In the same year, he moved to Paris and studied in high school for two years (1956-1958). Afterwards, he studied at École normale and attended school inspector training.

== Career ==
=== Education service ===
Upon finishing his education in France, Mbary-Daba returned to the Central African Republic and served as Head of Bouar School District (1960-1961). He then worked as a school inspector from 1963 to 1966.

Bokassa appointed Mbary-Daba as Minister of National Education on 12 January 1967, replacing Dominique Gueret, whom he sacked due to the poor results of the baccalaureate exam in Bangui. Two years later, on 28 February, he became the Minister of Public Service, Labor, and Social Services, a position that he served for almost seven months. Subsequently, he served as Minister of National Education, Youth, Sports, Arts, and Culture for nine months.

=== Diplomatic service ===
Upon stepping down from his ministerial job, Bokassa appointed Mbary-Daba as an ambassador of the Central African Republic to the Democratic Republic of the Congo (DRC), Rwanda, and Burundi in 1970. In 1971, he became the Ambassador to Gabon and presented a credential letter to Omar Bongo on 23 April 1971. He then served as Ambassador to Japan and South Korea on 31 August 1974. From 1979 to 1982, he worked as the Ambassador of the Central African Republic to the Ivory Coast. Afterward, he worked as the secretary-general of Minister of Foreign Affairs for two years (1984-1986). On 10 November 1988, he was the signatory to the Central African Republic-Germany Financial Cooperation Agreement.

== Death ==
Mbary-Daba died around 1997.

== Awards ==
- , Commander Order of Central African Merit - 8 September 1967.
- Academic Palms.
- , Commander National Order of Chad.
- Commander of the Japanese Order of Merit.
- The Republic of Korea’s National Order of Merit.
- , Commander Legion of Honour.

== Bibliography ==
- Bradshaw, Richard; Rius, Juan Fandos (2016). Historical Dictionary of the Central African Republic (Historical Dictionaries of Africa). Lanham: Rowman & Littlefield.
