= Sylvain Ndoutingai =

Lieutenant colonel Sylvain Ndoutingai

Minister of Finance and Budget
- In office 22 April 2011 – 2 June 2012
- President: François Bozizé
- Prime Minister: Faustin-Archange Touadéra
- Preceded by: Albert Besse
- Succeeded by: Albert Besse

Minister of State of Mines, Energy, and Water Resources
- In office 31 March 2003 – 22 April 2011
- President: François Bozizé
- Prime Minister: Abel Goumba; Célestin Gaombalet; Élie Doté; Faustin-Archange Touadéra
- Preceded by: André Nalké Dorogo
- Succeeded by: Obed Namsio (Mines); Léopold Mboli Fatran (Energy)

Personal details
- Born: 24 May 1972 Bossangoa or Nandobo, Central African Republic

Military service
- Allegiance: Central African Republic
- Branch/service: FACA
- Rank: Lieutenant colonel

Lieutenant Colonel Sylvain Ndoutingai (born 24 May 1972) is a military officer and politician in the Central African Republic. He is the nephew of former president François Bozizé. He was born in Bossangoa.

Ndoutingai was Minister of State of Mines, Energy, and Water Resources from 2008 to April 2011. He was Minister of Finance and Budget from 2006 to 2008 and from 2011 to 2012. He was dismissed by Bozizé in June 2012.
