= Alphonse Koyamba =

Central African economist and politician

Minister of the Treasury
- In office 4 April 1976 – 4 September 1976
- President: Jean-Bédel Bokassa

Minister of Finance
- In office 27 October 1972 – 9 June 1975
- President: Jean-Bédel Bokassa
- Preceded by: Enoch Dérant Lakoué
- Succeeded by: Marie-Christine Gbokou

Personal details
- Born: 2 August 1941 Ouésso, French Congo (now the Republic of the Congo)
- Died: 5 May 1998 (aged 56) Strasbourg, France
- Occupation: Economist; Politician

Alphonse Koyamba (2 August 1941 - 5 May 1998) was a Central African economist and politician who held two ministerial positions during the Bokassa government.

== Early life and career ==
Born in Ouésso on 2 August 1941, Koyamba began his career by becoming the director of statistics and economic affairs at the High Commission for Planning. He later joined the Ministry of Finance in the unknown year and served as the director of the central bank and then statistics and economic forecasting on 2 June 1971. Afterward, Bokassa appointed him as deputy minister of finance, industry, and trade on 13 May 1972 for five months.

== Minister of Finance ==
Koyamba became the minister of finance on 27 October 1972. During his tenure, he signed a monetary cooperation agreement between the BEAC member states and France on 23 November 1972 on behalf of the Central African Republic. He also led the Central African Republic delegation to South Africa in February 1975 where the delegates signed the 4-million ZAR aid package for a tourist hotel complex near Bangui. However, Bokassa dismissed Koyamba on 9 June 1975 and replaced him with Marie-Christine Gbokou due to the accusation of accounting mistakes.

== Late career ==
One month after Koyamba's dismissal as minister of finance, Bokassa assigned him as the minister of state in charge of the Treasury on 4 July 1975. The next year, he became the Minister of State in charge of organizing the Treasury in February. He also chaired the Central African delegation at the 3rd Franco-African Forum in Paris. On 4 September 1976, returning from Libya, Bokassa founded a government based on Libya's model named Council of the Central African Revolution and appointed Koyamba as the third deputy prime minister responsible for the treasury. Later, his rank within the government was elevated to the first deputy prime minister in charge of Treasury and Finance on 4 December 1976.

On 16 June 1977, Koyamba had a car accident that caused his skull, spine, and femur to break. As a result, he was flown to France for treatment. Meanwhile, the position of first deputy prime minister was vacant until May 1978, when Henri Maïdou replaced Koyamba temporarily. Afterward, Koyamba was installed as First Deputy Prime Minister in charge of economic and financial coordination on 22 September 1978. Following a reshuffle, Koyamba was appointed as Deputy Prime Minister responsible for finance on 13 March 1979.

When Bokassa received news from René Journiac that Valéry Giscard d'Estaing demanded his resignation from position during his visit to Franceville on 1 August 1979, he was furious and tried to prevent that incident occurred. Hence, Bokassa tried to lobby some African leaders so that they can defend him from France's overthrow attempt and he entrusted Koyamba to convey this message to Félix Houphouët-Boigny and Léopold Sédar Senghor. Later, he contacted Journiac to hold covert meeting with Giscard at the Fort of Brégançon. From this secret meeting, he discreetly worked together with Henri Maïdou, Michel Gallin-Douathe, and Bernard Ayandho to remove Bokassa from power. Apart from that, together with Maïdou, he signed the letter titled "Appeal to France" on 4 September 1979 calling for French intervention to remove Bokassa from power. The letter was sent to the French government through its embassy in Bangui and it served as France's justification to launch Operation Barracuda.

On 18 September 1979, Bokassa and his 20 entourages, including Koyamba, secretly went to Tripoli to meet Gaddafi. Nevertheless, Bokassa Libya's visit news was leaked to Giscard, causing him to approve Operation Barracuda, aiming to topple Bokassa. Bokassa was ousted on 21 September and David Dacko was installed as the new president. During the coup, Koyamba was in Libya. Later, he went back to Bangui and Dacko appointed him as First Vice Prime Minister, responsible for the economy and finance, telecommunications, and state-owned enterprises. In November 1979, he met Houphouët-Boigny on the Ivory Coast to persuade him to extradite Bokassa back, and it failed.

The Minister of Justice, François Guéret, filed charges against Koyamba, Maïdou, and Bozizé for repression and embezzlement on 19 January 1980. Subsequently, he was sacked as a vice prime minister on 16 July. Koyamba also participated in the Central African Republic's Criminal Court debates where he testified to Bokassa's methods of 20 million CFA state fund corruption. In July 1983, Koyamba was appointed as the Director at the Bank of Central African States (BEAC) Bangui Branch and held that position until 1992.

== Death and personal life ==
Koyamba died in Strasbourg on 5 May 1998.

Koyamba was a Christian. In 1976, along with Maïdou, Koyamba was one of the two government ministers who refused to convert to Islam when the others followed Bokassa's footsteps to become Muslims.
