= Hristina Obradović =

Serbian hegumenia and abbess (1931–2026)

- Христина Обрадовић
- Born: Velika Obradović; 20 December 1931; Sedlari, Kingdom of Yugoslavia
- Died: 18 January 2026 (aged 94); Ljubostinja, Serbia
- Education: Monastery Jovanje
- Occupations: Hegumenia; Abbess

Velika "Hristina Obradović (Serbian: Велика "Христина" Обрадовић; 20 December 1931 – 18 January 2026) was a Serbian hegumenia and abbess.

Obradović famously served as abbess Ljubostinja in the Eparchy of Kruševac.

== Biography ==
Born in Sedlari on 20 December 1931, Obradović was the daughter of Dušan and Janja. In 1944, she entered the Monastery Jovanje to study after receiving inspiration from her brother, Milorad, to dedicate her life to the faith. She left in 1947 after completing her training and joined Ljubostinja under abbess Varvara Milenović. She was ordained as a nun in 1951 by bishop Valerijan (Stefanović). After the death of Milenović in 1995, she was chosen as the third abbess of Ljubostinja, a position she held for thirty years.

Obradović died at Ljubostinja on 18 January 2026, at the age of 94.
