= Simon Samba =

Central African politician

Member of National Assembly
- In office 30 September 1964 – 1 January 1966
- Constituency: Bimbo

Personal details
- Born: 29 March 1929 Sakpa, Bimbo, Ubangi-Shari (now the present-day Central African Republic)
- Died: Unknown Unknown
- Political party: MESAN
- Children: Léopold Ismael Samba
- Occupation: Politician

Simon Samba (29 March 1929 - unknown) was a Central African politician who served as MP for Bimbo from 1964 to 1966 and Aka Pygmy leader.

== Life ==
An Aka, Samba was born in Sakpa on 29 March 1929.

=== Political career ===
At first, Samba served as canton chief. He then became the mayor of Kpale commune and joined MESAN. In 1964, he participated in the election as an MP candidate representing Bimbo from the MESAN party and was elected. David Dacko appointed Samba as a member of Central African Order of Merit Council on 26 June 1964. Later, he resigned from his position as mayor of Kpale on 30 September 1964. As a Dacko's associate, he granted his land to Prosper Mounoumbaye for shooting training and advised Dacko to be careful with Bokassa.

=== Arrest ===
In the Saint-Sylvestre coup d'état, Jean-Claude Mandaba arrested Samba in Sakpa on 1 January 1966 at 5 am and imprisoned him at Ngaragba Prison. He was put into the same cell with other Dacko's close colleagues. In September 1966, Samba and his son were transferred to the guardroom. Bokassa freed Samba and Leopold from imprisonment on 13 October 1969. He died in an unknown year.

== Honors and recognition ==
On 1 December 1964, Samba was awarded Commander Order of Central African Merit. A monument to commemorate Simon Samba was erected in Bimbo and was inaugurated by Henri-Marie Dondra on 7 December 2020.

== Bibliography ==
- Bradshaw, Richard; Rius, Juan Fandos (2016). Historical Dictionary of the Central African Republic (Historical Dictionaries of Africa). Lanham: Rowman & Littlefield.
- Baccard, André (1987). Les Martyrs de Bokassa. Paris: Editions du Seuil.
