= Léopold Ismael Samba =

Central African civil servant (1946–2022)

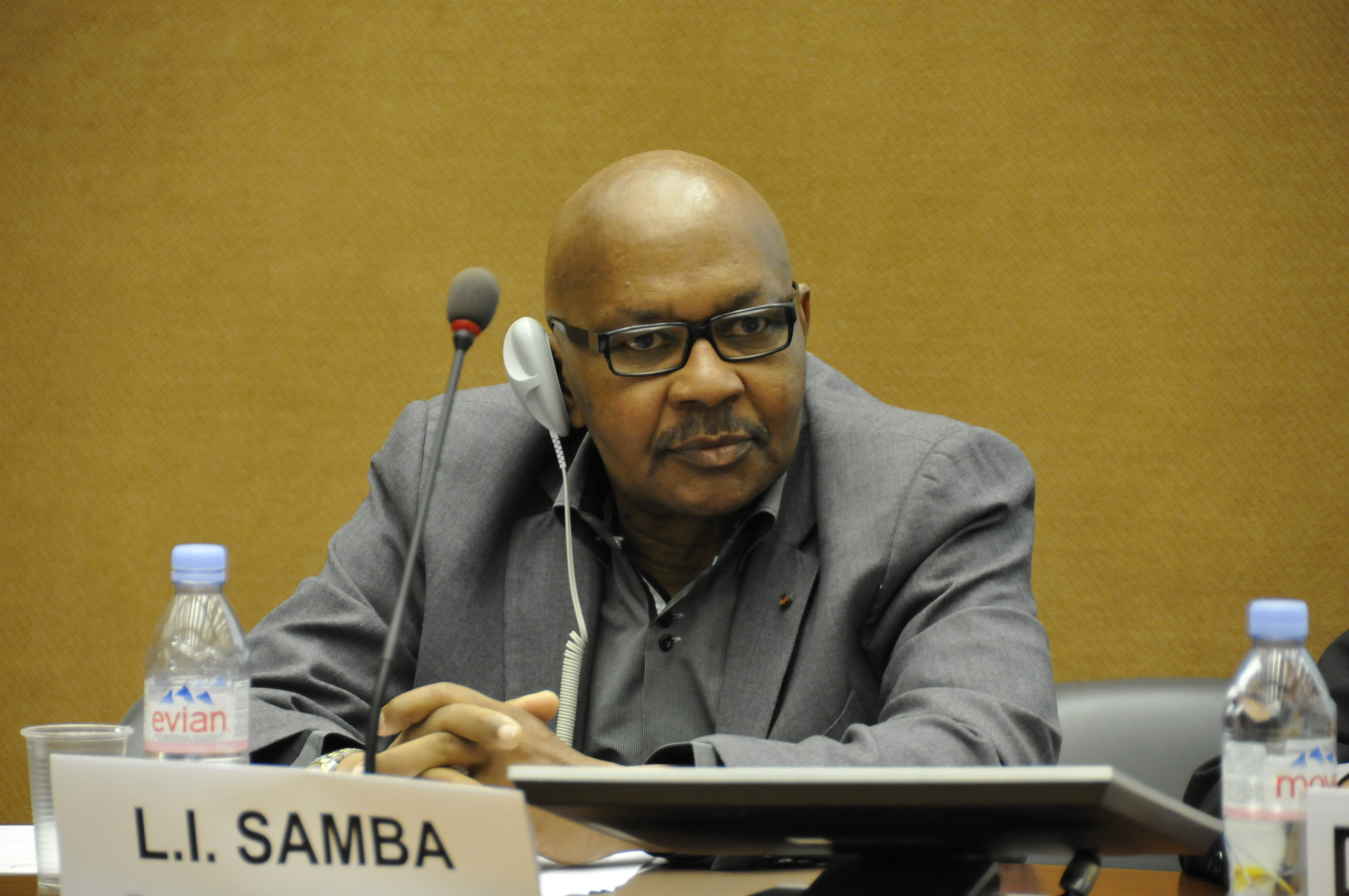
- Léopold Ismael Samba in 2012

Permanent Representatives of Central African Republic to the United Nations at Geneva
- In office 2009 – 2 September 2022
- President: François Bozizé; Michel Djotodia; Alexandre-Ferdinand Nguendet; Catherine Samba-Panza; Faustin-Archange Touadéra

Personal details
- Born: 22 March 1946 Sakpa, Bimbo, Ubangi-Shari (now the present-day Central African Republic)
- Died: 2 September 2022 (aged 76) Geneva, Switzerland
- Spouse: Marguerite Samba
- Parent: Simon Samba (father)
- Education: Paris 1 Panthéon-Sorbonne University; Institut international d'administration publique
- Occupation: Civil Servant; Diplomat

Military service
- Allegiance: Central African Republic
- Branch/service: FACA
- Years of service: 1965-1966
- Battles/wars: Saint-Sylvestre coup d'état

Léopold Ismael Maliavo Samba (22 March 1946 – 2 September 2022) was a Central African civil servant, diplomat, and former soldier.

== Early life and education ==
Samba was born in Sakpa on 22 March 1946. His father was Simon Samba. He studied at Paris 1 Panthéon-Sorbonne University from 1975 to 1977 and earned a bachelor's degree in economics and development. Afterward, he continued his postgraduate at the Paris 1 Panthéon-Sorbonne University in 1977 and gained a master's degree in economics and agricultural development in 1978. In 1986, he earned a degree in international negotiations from the International Institute for Law in Rome.

== Career ==
=== Army and civil service ===
Samba joined FACA in July 1965. Six months later, in the Saint-Sylvestre coup d'état, he was arrested together with his father. Samba was first jailed in Birao cell and was put into the same cell as Michel Adama-Tamboux. He later transferred to a guardroom in Bangui in September 1966, together with his father. Bokassa released them on 13 October 1969.

In 1987, Samba served as the State Inspector in charge of controlling and managing public administrations at the president's office for three years. In 1990, he worked as an administrative magistrate and financial chamber advisor at the Supreme Court for two years. Subsequently, he was assigned as coordinator of monitoring and controlling the numbers of civil servants and state agents from 1992 to 2003. In 2003, he served Ministry of Public Service's mission officer until 2005. Then, he worked as Central Inspector and Head of Service for two years (2005–2007).

During Samba's career in government, he served in various positions, such as mission officer at the Ministry of Economy and Finance, advisor to the minister, advisor to the Minister of Commerce and Industry, and Director of the Coffee Price Stabilization and Equalization Fund. Moreover, he also represented the Central African Republic in several international conferences, meetings, and negotiations.

=== Diplomat ===
Samba was appointed as Permanent Representative of the Central African Republic to the World Trade Organization in Geneva in 2007. Bozize appointed Samba as the Permanent Representative of the Central African Republic to the United Nations in Geneva in 2008 and presented the credential letter to Sergei Ordzhonikidze on 19 January 2009. While serving as permanent representative, he was assigned as Ambassador of the Central African Republic to Switzerland residing in Geneva and presented a letter of credence to Hans-Rudolf Merz and Corina Casanova on 7 May 2009.

During his post as CAR's permanent representative in UN Geneva, he served as Dean of the Group of African Ambassadors, coordinator of the African Group at the World Health Organization (WHO), and vice-president of the Group of Francophone Ambassadors. Representing the African Group at WHO, he proposed the creation of a Universal Health Periodic Review to WHO in 2018 which he claimed was influenced by the human rights process. Furthermore, responding to the Murder of George Floyd, he spoke on the behalf of Africa countries calling 'all governments to take collective measures to combat systemic racism and police brutality" during the 43rd session of the Human Rights Council.

== Death ==
Samba died in Geneva on 2 September 2022.

== Personal life ==
Samba married Marguerite Samba, who later served as Minister of Public Health during Mahamat Kamoun government.

== Bibliography ==
- Baccard, André (1987). Les Martyrs de Bokassa. Paris: Editions du Seuil.
