= Minister of Finance and Budget (Central African Republic) =

Minister of Finance and Budget of the Central African Republic is a government minister in charge of the Ministry of Finance and Budget of Central African Republic, which is responsible for public finances of the country.

== Ministers responsible for finance ==
- Abel Goumba, 1957-1959
- Albert Payao, 1959-1962
- Charles Bornou, 1962-1966
- Alexandre Banza, 1966-1967
- Antoine Guimali, 1968-1970
- François Valentin Gon, 1970-1971
- Enoch Dérant Lakoué, 1971-1972
- Alphonse Koyamba, 1972-1975
- Marie-Christine Gbokou, 1975-1977
- Hugues Dobozendi, 1977-1978
- François Epaye, 1978-1979
- Alphonse Koyamba, 1979-1980
- Dieudonne Padoundji-Yadjoua, 1980
- François Farra-Frond, 1980-1981
- Barthélémy Kanda, 1981
- Timothée Marboua, 1981-1982
- Alphonse Kongolo-Mbomy, 1982-1983
- Sylvestre Bangui, 1983-1984
- Jean-Louis Gervil-Yambala, 1984-1986
- Dieudonné Wazoua, ?-1987-1991
- Auguste Tenekouezoa, 1991-1992
- Emmanuel Dokouna, 1992-1996
- Jean-Paul Ngoupande, 1996-1997
- Anicet-Georges Dologuélé, 1997-2001
- Eric Sorongopé, 2001-2003
- Martin Ziguélé, 2003
- Abel Goumba, 2003
- Jean Pierre Lebouder, 2003-2004
- Daniel Nditiféï Boyssembè, 2004-2005
- Théodore Dabanga, 2005-2006
- Sylvain Ndoutingai, 2006-2008
- Élie Doté, 2006-2008
- Emmanuel Bizo, 2008-2009
- Albert Besse, 2009-2011
- Sylvain Ndoutingai, 2011-2012
- Nicolas Tiangaye, 2013-2014
- Rémy Yakoro, 2014
- Bonandelé Koumba, 2014-2015
- Abdallah Kadre Hassan, 2015-2016
- Célestin Yanendji, 2016
- Henri-Marie Dondra, 2016-2021
- Hervé Ndoba, 2021-

== See also ==
- Economy of Central African Republic
