= Sedlari, Trebinje =

Sedlari Седлари
- Village
- Interactive map of Sedlari
- Location within Bosnia and Herzegovina
- Coordinates: 42°49′35″N 18°03′25″E
- Country: Bosnia and Herzegovina
- Entity: Republika Srpska
- Municipality: Trebinje
- Time zone: UTC+1 (CET)
  - Summer (DST): UTC+2 (CEST)

Sedlari (Serbian Cyrillic: Седлари) is a village in the municipality of Trebinje, Republika Srpska, Bosnia and Herzegovina.
