= Nandobo =

- Location in Central African Republic
- Coordinates: 4°40′0″N 15°47′55″E
- Country: Central African Republic
- Prefecture: Mambéré-Kadéï
- Sub-prefecture: Berbérati
- Commune: Haute-Batouri

Nandobo is a mining town located in Mambéré-Kadéï Prefecture, Central African Republic.

== History ==
An alleged Anti-balaka armed group captured Nandobo on 15 December 2020 and kidnapped four gendarmeries, including the commander. Due to the attack, the residents fled either to the bush or Berbérati.

== Economy ==
Near the town, there are diamond mines.

== Education ==
Nandobo has one school.

== Healthcare ==
There is a health center in the town.
