= Alexandre Banza =

Central African army officer and politician (1932–1969)

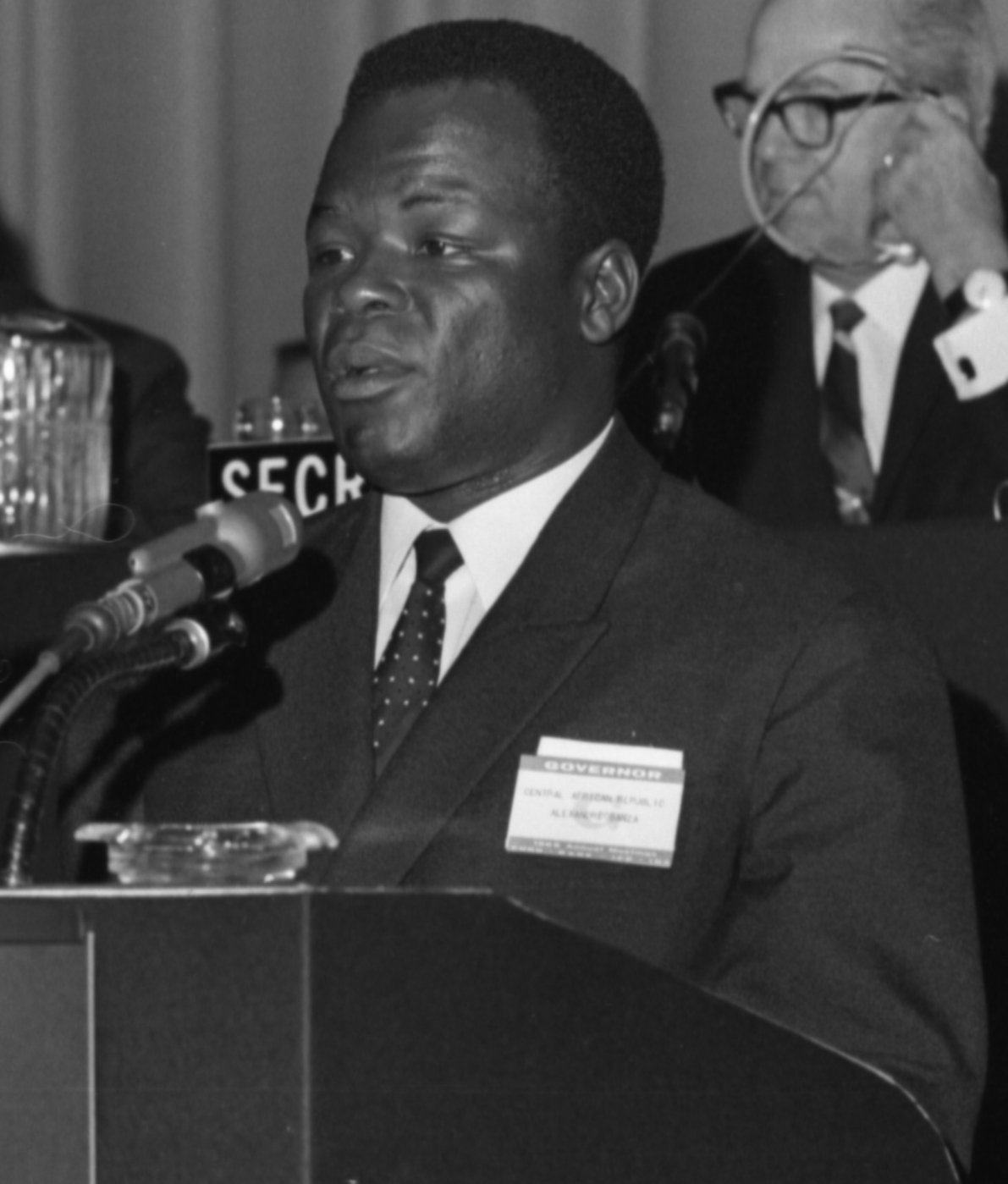
- Banza in 1966

Minister of state
- In office January 1, 1966–April, 1968

Minister of Finance
- In office 1 January 1966 – April 1968
- Preceded by: Charles Bornou
- Succeeded by: Antoine Guimali

Commander of the Camp Kassaï Military Base
- In office 1965?-January 1, 1966

Personal details
- Born: 10 October 1932 Carnot, Ubangi-Shari (Note: Ubangi-Shari was a constituent territory of French Equatorial Africa. When it became independent on 13 August 1960 it was renamed the Central African Republic.)
- Died: 12 April 1969 (aged 36) Camp Kassaï, Central African Republic
- Party: MESAN
- Occupation: Military officer, Minister

Lieutenant Colonel Alexandre Banza (10 October 1932 – 12 April 1969) was a military officer and politician in the Central African Republic. Born in Carnot, Ubangi-Shari, Banza served with the French Army during the First Indochina War before joining the Central African Armed Forces. As commander of the Camp Kassaï military base in 1965, Banza helped Jean-Bédel Bokassa overthrow the government of President David Dacko. Bokassa rewarded Banza by appointing him as minister of state and minister of finance in the new government. Banza quickly established the new regime's reputation abroad and forged diplomatic relations with other countries. In 1967, Bokassa and his protégé had a major argument over the president's extravagances. In April 1968, Bokassa removed Banza as minister of finance. Recognizing Bokassa's attempts to undermine him, Banza made a number of remarks highly critical of the president's handling of the government. Bokassa responded by abolishing the minister of state position.

Banza soon decided to stage a coup d'état. He confided in a few military officers, who he hoped would support his attempt to gain power. One of his confidants, Jean-Claude Mandaba, contacted the president and informed him of the date of the coup, 9 April 1969. Hours before he was going to execute his bid for power, Banza was ambushed by Mandaba and taken directly to Bokassa. Bokassa nearly beat Banza to death before Mandaba suggested that Banza be put on trial for appearance's sake. On 12 April, Banza presented his case to a military tribunal, which quickly sentenced him to death by firing squad. He was reportedly taken to an open field, where he was executed and buried in an unmarked grave. Alternate circumstances of Banza's death have been reported in Time and Le Monde. In the aftermath of the failed coup, Banza's family, mistress and close associates were all arrested and either sent to jail or deported. With Banza eliminated, Bokassa spent extravagantly and surrounded himself with adulators.

== Early life and military career ==
Banza was born on 10 October 1932. He was the first of three sons and grew up in the heart of Gbaya territory. Banza studied In Cameroon and Congo-Brazzaville. In his twenties, he had served with the French army in the First Indochina War and had been stationed in Gabon, Morocco, Tunisia and other locations in colonial Africa. He had a similar military record to his future colleague Jean-Bédel Bokassa, who had also served in the First Indochina War and had been stationed in Africa and Europe as a radio transmissions expert. Afterward, Banza returned to the Central African Republic, where he enlisted in the armed forces. Brian Titley, author of Dark Age: The Political Odyssey of Emperor Bokassa described Banza as an "intelligent, ambitious, and unscrupulous" military officer.

== Role in Saint-Sylvestre coup d'état ==
=== Background ===
Central African Republic President David Dacko, Bokassa's cousin, took over the country in 1960, after winning a power struggle against Abel Goumba. Bokassa left the French army to join the Central African Republic army in 1962. By 1965, the country was in turmoil—plagued by corruption and slow economic growth, while its borders were breached by rebels from neighboring countries. Dacko obtained financial aid from the People's Republic of China, but in spite of this support, the country's problems persisted. Bokassa, now commander-in-chief of the army, made plans to take over the government; Dacko became aware of this, and countered by forming a gendarmerie headed by police chief Jean Izamo, who quickly became Dacko's closest adviser.

Tensions between Dacko and Bokassa increased. In December 1965, Dacko approved a budget increase for Izamo's gendarmerie, but rejected the budget proposal for Bokassa's army. At this point, Bokassa told friends he was annoyed by Dacko's treatment and was "going for a coup d'état". Dacko planned to replace Bokassa with Izamo as his personal military adviser, and wanted to promote army officers loyal to the government, while demoting Bokassa and his close associates. Bokassa realized he had to act against Dacko quickly, and worried that his 500-man army would be no match for the gendarmerie and the presidential guard. He was also concerned the French would intervene to aid Dacko, as had occurred after the 23 February 1964 coup d'état in Gabon against President Léon M'ba. After receiving word of the coup from the country's military chief of staff, Albert-Bernard Bongo, officials in Paris sent paratroopers to Gabon and restored M'ba to power in a matter of hours. Banza, who was then commander of the Camp Kassaï military base in northeast Bangui, offered Bokassa his support and persuaded the still-worried commander-in-chief to carry out the coup. He helped Bokassa lay out the plans for the coup, proposed to take place on 31 December 1965.

=== Execution of the coup ===
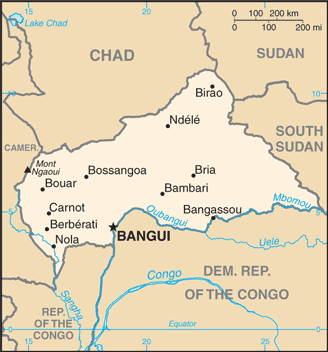
The capital Bangui, represented with a star in the map, was the site of the coup.

Early in the evening of 31 December 1965, Dacko left the Palais de la Renaissance to visit one of his minister's plantations southwest of the capital. At 22:30 WAT (UTC 21:30), Captain Banza gave orders to his officers to begin the coup; one of his subordinates was to subdue the security guard in the presidential palace, while the other was to take control of Radio-Bangui to prevent communication between Dacko and his followers. Bokassa called Izamo at his headquarters, asking him to come to Camp de Roux to sign some papers that needed his immediate attention. Izamo, who was at a New Year's Eve celebration with friends, reluctantly agreed and traveled in his wife's car to the camp. Upon arrival, he was confronted by Banza and Bokassa, who informed him of the coup in progress. After announcing his refusal to support the coup, Izamo was overpowered and locked in a cellar.

Shortly after midnight, in the first minutes of 1 January 1966, Bokassa and Banza organized their troops and told them of their plan to take over the government. Bokassa claimed that Dacko had resigned from the presidency and given the position to his close adviser Izamo. He then told the soldiers that they had to act now to prevent the gendarmerie from taking over the Central African Republic army. He then asked the soldiers if they would support his course of action; the men who refused were thrown in jail. At 00:30 WAT, Banza, Bokassa and their supporters left Camp de Roux to take over the capital. They encountered little resistance and were able to take Bangui in a matter of hours. Bokassa and Banza then rushed to the Palais de la Renaissance, where they tried to arrest Dacko, who was not there. Bokassa began to panic, as he believed the president had been warned of the coup in advance, and immediately ordered his soldiers to search for Dacko in the countryside until he was found.

Dacko was not aware of the events taking place in the capital. After leaving his minister's plantation near midnight, he headed to Simon Samba's house to ask the Aka Pgymy leader to conduct a year-end ritual. After an hour at Samba's house, he was informed of the coup in Bangui. He was arrested by a few of Bokassa's men as he entered Pétévo Junction, on the western border of the capital. Dacko was escorted to the presidential palace, where Bokassa hugged the president and told him, "I tried to warn you—but now it's too late". President Dacko was then taken to Ngaragba Prison in east Bangui at around 02:00 WAT. In a move that he thought would boost his popularity in the country, Bokassa ordered prison director Otto Sacher to release all prisoners in the jail. Bokassa then took Dacko to Camp Kassaï at 03:20 WAT, where the president was forced by Banza to resign from office. Banza wanted to kill Dacko, but Bokassa would not allow it, believing that Dacko had not yet outlived his usefulness. Later, Bokassa's officers announced on Radio-Bangui that the Dacko government had been toppled and Bokassa had taken over control. Meanwhile, Banza took over administrative centers, where politicians, diplomats and other high-level officials were celebrating the coming of the New Year.

== Minister in the Bokassa government ==
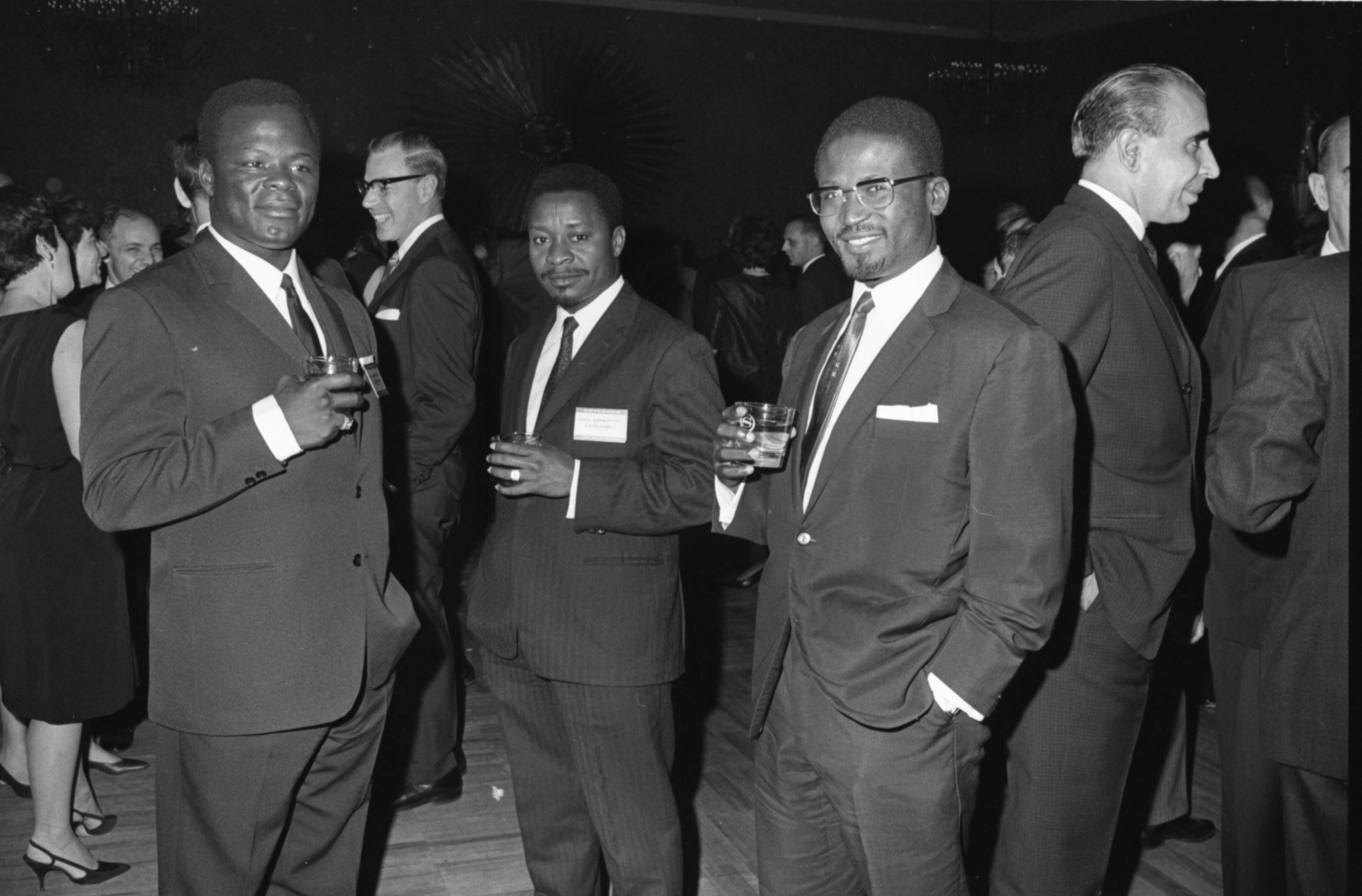
Banza (left) attended the World Bank's Annual Meeting in Washington DC in 1966

Banza was appointed minister of finance and minister of state in the new government. The regime first secured diplomatic recognition from President François Tombalbaye of neighboring Chad, whom Bokassa met in Bouca, Ouham. After Bokassa reciprocated by meeting Tombalbaye on 2 April 1966 along the southern border of Chad at Fort Archambault, the two decided to help one another if either was in danger of losing power. Soon after, other African countries began to diplomatically recognize the new government. At first, the French government was reluctant to support the Bokassa regime, so Banza went to Paris to meet with French officials to convince them that the coup was necessary to save the country from turmoil. Bokassa met with Prime Minister Georges Pompidou on 7 July 1966, but the French remained noncommittal in offering their support.

After Bokassa threatened to withdraw from the franc monetary zone, French President Charles de Gaulle decided to make an official visit to the Central African Republic on 17 November 1966. To the new government, this visit meant that the French had accepted the new changes in the country. De Gaulle privately saw Banza as unreliable and believed him to have ties to the CIA. During meetings with Jacques Foccart in late 1967, de Gaulle expressed his wish that Bokassa should liquidate Banza instead of seeking reconciliation with him.

As a minister of finance, Banza directed much of his energy and time into lifting the country out of bankruptcy. Banza was also successful in his efforts to build the government's reputation abroad, all the while establishing himself as a respected and well-liked leader. Many believed that he would not remain as Bokassa's right-hand man for much longer. After Banza was promoted from captain to lieutenant colonel in 1965, Bokassa realized that his greatest political threat was not from the remaining group of Dacko supporters, but from Banza himself.

Two years later, the two had a major argument over the country's budget, as Banza adamantly opposed Bokassa's extravagant spending. Bokassa moved to Camp de Roux, where he felt he could safely run the government without having to worry about Banza's thirst for power. In the meantime, Banza tried to obtain a support base within the army, spending much of his time in the company of soldiers. Bokassa recognized what his minister was doing, so he sent military units most sympathetic to Banza to the country's border and brought his own army supporters as close to the capital as possible. In September 1967, he took a special trip to Paris, where he asked for protection from French troops. Two months later, the government deployed 80 paratroopers to Bangui.

On 13 April 1968, in another one of his frequent cabinet reshuffles, Bokassa demoted Banza to minister of health, but let him remain in his position as minister of state. Cognizant of the president's intentions, Banza increased his vocalization of dissenting political views. A year later, after Banza made a number of remarks highly critical of Bokassa and his management of the economy, the president, perceiving an immediate threat to his power, removed him as his minister of state.

=== 1969 coup plot ===
Banza revealed his intention to stage a coup to Lieutenant Jean-Claude Mandaba, the commanding officer of Camp Kassaï, who he looked to for support. Mandaba went along with the plan, but his allegiance remained with Bokassa. When Banza contacted his co-conspirators on 8 April 1969, informing them that they would execute the coup the following day, Mandaba immediately phoned Bokassa and informed him of the plan. When Banza entered Camp Kassaï on 9 April 1969, he was ambushed by Mandaba and his soldiers. The men had to break Banza's arms before they could overpower and throw him into the trunk of a Mercedes and take him directly to Bokassa. At his house in Berengo, Bokassa beat Banza nearly to death before Mandaba suggested that Banza be put on trial for appearance's sake.

On 12 April, Banza presented his case before a military tribunal at Camp de Roux, where he admitted to his plan, but stated that he had not planned to kill Bokassa. He was sentenced to death by firing squad, taken to an open field behind Camp Kassaï, executed and buried in an unmarked grave. The circumstances of Banza's death have been disputed. The American newsmagazine, Time, reported that Banza "was dragged before a Cabinet meeting where Bokassa slashed him with a razor. Guards then beat Banza until his back was broken, dragged him through the streets of Bangui and finally shot him." The French daily evening newspaper Le Monde reported that Banza was killed in circumstances "so revolting that it still makes one's flesh creep":

Two versions concerning the end circumstances of his death differ on one minor detail. Did Bokassa tie him to a pillar before personally carving him with a knife that he had previously used for stirring his coffee in the gold-and-midnight blue Sèvres coffee set, or was the murder committed on the cabinet table with the help of other persons? Late that afternoon, soldiers dragged a still identifiable corpse, with the spinal column smashed, from barrack to barrack to serve as an example.

== Aftermath of coup ==
A few days later, Bokassa had Banza's wife and their nine children arrested and deported to Berbérati and then Birao. They were released on 6 May 1971. Banza's mistress, Julienne Kombo, who entered the Palais de la Renaissance crying hysterically after her lover's death, was arrested and jailed until 24 June 1972. Banza's father was sent to jail, where he died of hunger and exhaustion on 24 April 1970 at Ngaragba Central Prison. Banza's two younger brothers, Beuoane and Gouboulo, were dismissed from the gendarmerie in July and sent to Ngaragba Prison. In August 1971, they were taken from the prison, never to be seen again.

Bokassa also hunted down Banza's close associates, such as Joseph Kallot, Faustin Marigot and Polycarpe Gbaguili. Kallot and Marigot died in prison in June 1969 and April 1971, respectively. With the exception of Gbaguili, who remained in prison until the downfall of the Bokassa regime on 20 September 1979, the other associates were released months after their arrest. Gbaguili served as a witness in Bokassa's criminal trials for treason, murder, cannibalism and embezzlement during the 1980s, explaining in detail the numerous crimes and human rights violations the former dictator had completed.

By eliminating his dangerous rival, Bokassa demonstrated his ability to deal ruthlessly with dissidents and political opponents. He started to rule more arbitrarily after the Banza affair, giving himself control of various ministerial positions and the army. In one instance, he promoted Second Lieutenant François Bozizé, the future president of the Central African Republic, to General after he beat a Frenchman who showed disrespect for the president. According to Brian Titley, author of Dark Age: The Political Odyssey of Emperor Bokassa, he surrounded himself with "sycophants, who were all too willing to nurture his growing delusions of grandeur"; with no one to stop him, he also spent money with reckless abandon.

== Notes ==
Footnotes

Source notes
