= Order of Central African Merit =

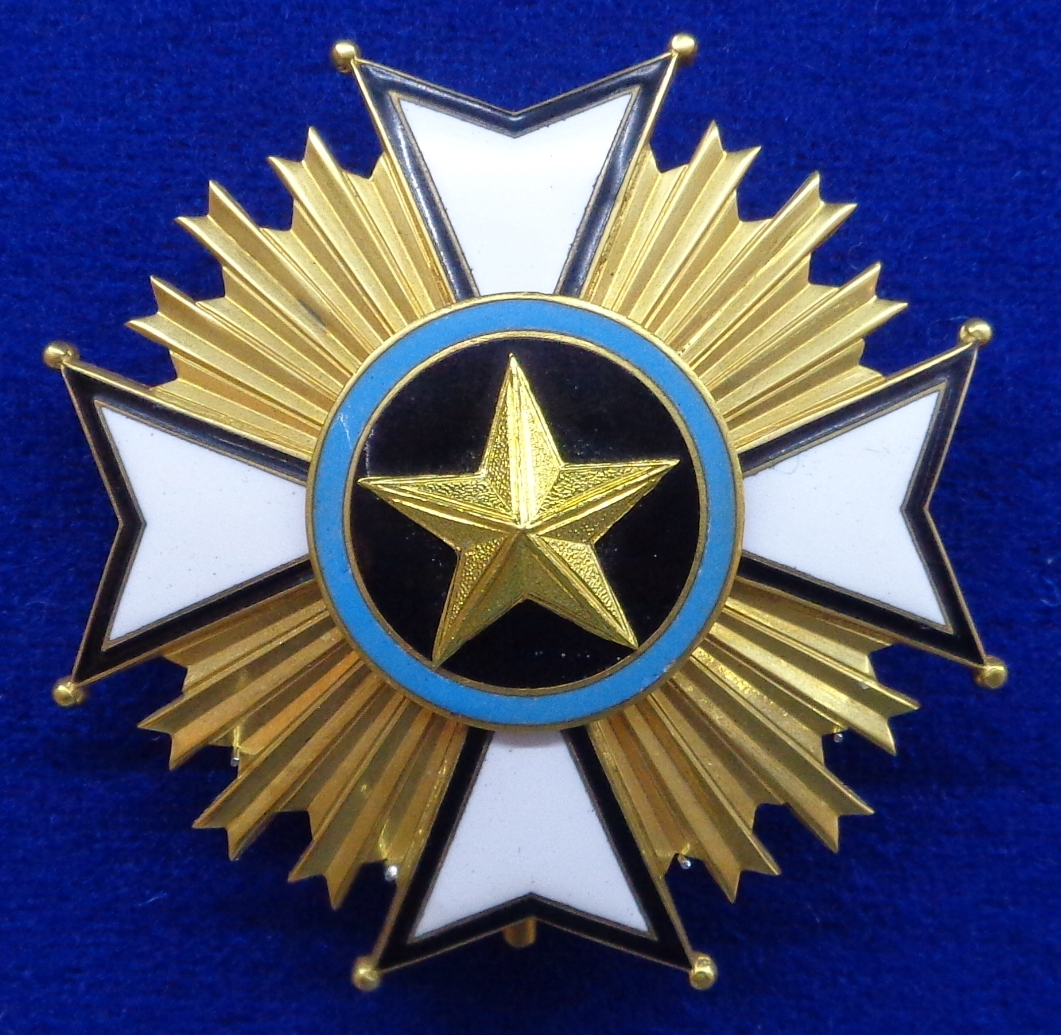
- Breast star of the order
- Type: Order of merit
- Awarded for: Special merit in the humanitarian, economic and social spheres
- Presented by: Central African Republic
- Established: 20 June 1959
- Ribbon of the order

The Order of Central African Merit is the highest civil decoration of the Central African Republic. It was instituted on 20 June 1959, with the Grand Officer class being added on October 13, 1961.

It is awarded for special merit in the humanitarian, economic and social spheres.

== Grades ==
It has five grades: Grand Cross, Grand Officer, Commander, Officer, and Knight. In addition, there is a Collar, which is the de facto presidential insignia.

Ribbon bars of the Order of Central African Merit
Grand Cross	Grand Officer	Commander	Officer	Knight

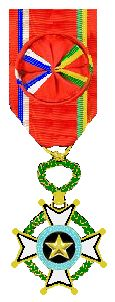
Order of Merit, Officer's badge front

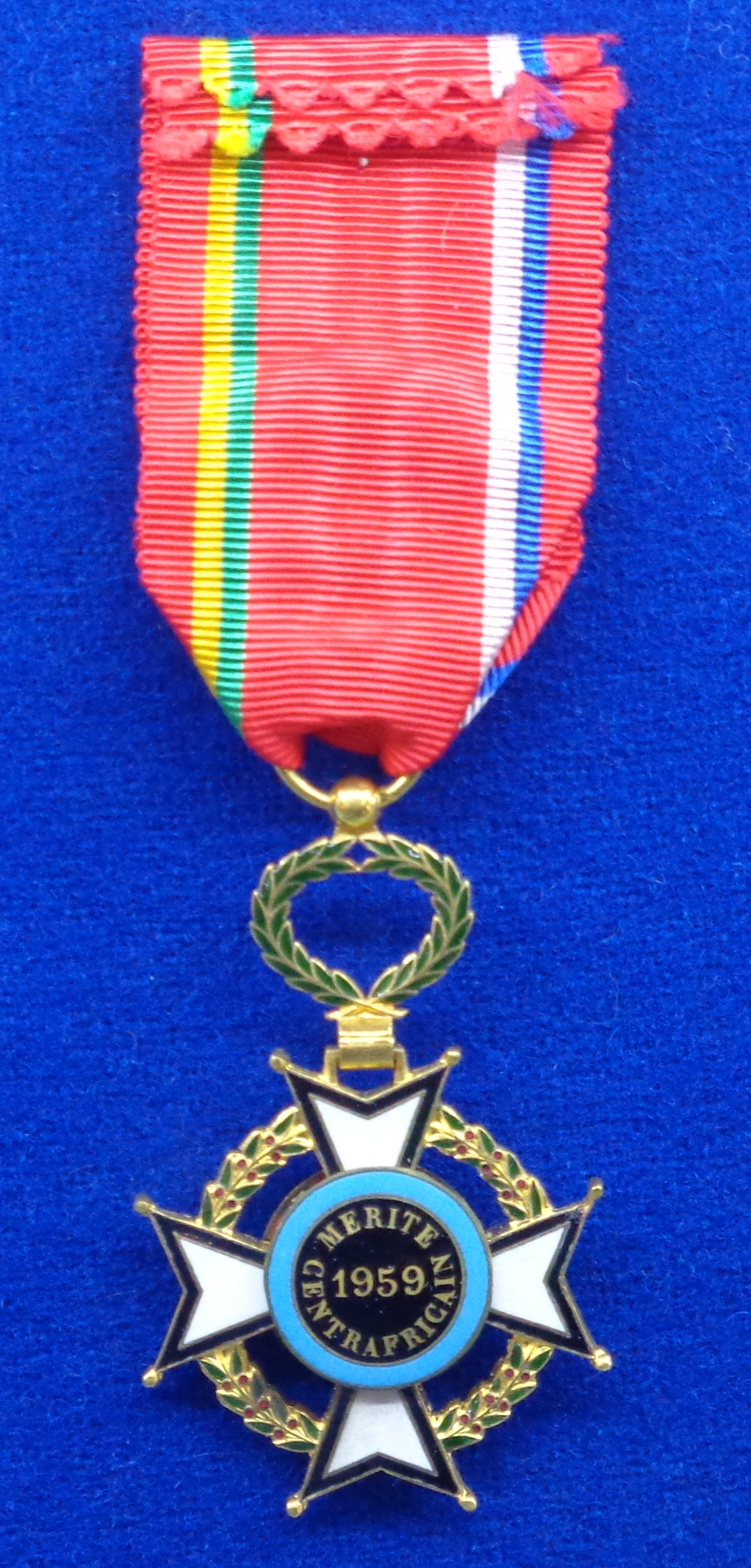
Order of Merit, Officer's badge reverse
