= List of Central African Republic–related topics =

This is a list of topics related to the Central African Republic.

== Buildings and structures in the Central African Republic ==
=== Airports in the Central African Republic ===
- Bangui M'Poko International Airport

=== Sports venues in the Central African Republic ===
==== Football venues in the Central African Republic ====
- Barthélemy Boganda Stadium

== Communications in the Central African Republic ==
- AfricaPhonebook/Annulaires Afrique
- Communications in the Central African Republic
- .cf
- List of people on stamps of Central African Republic
- Socatel

== Central African culture ==
- Coat of arms of the Central African Republic
- Flag of the Central African Republic
- La Renaissance
- Public holidays in the Central African Republic

=== Central African music ===
- Music of the Central African Republic

==== Gabonese music ====
- Music of Gabon

===== Gabonese musicians =====
- Pierre Akendengué
- Patience Dabany
- Oliver N'Goma

=== Languages of the Central African Republic ===
- Aja language
- Fer language
- Gbaya language
- Makaa–Njem languages
- Sango language

=== Sport in the Central African Republic ===
==== Football in the Central African Republic ====
- Central African Republic national football team
- Central African Football Federation

==== Central African Republic at the Olympics ====
- Central African Republic at the 1992 Summer Olympics
- Central African Republic at the 1996 Summer Olympics
- Central African Republic at the 2000 Summer Olympics
- Central African Republic at the 2004 Summer Olympics
- Central African Republic at the 2008 Summer Olympics

== Economy of the Central African Republic ==
- Economy of the Central African Republic

=== Companies of the Central African Republic ===
- Socatel

=== Trade unions of the Central African Republic ===
- Confédération Syndicale des Travailleurs de Centrafrique
- National Confederation of Central African Workers
- Union of Central African Workers

== Education in the Central African Republic ==
- University of Bangui

=== Universities and colleges in the Central African Republic ===
- University of Bangui

== Geography of the Central African Republic ==
- Geography of the Central African Republic
- Adamawa Plateau
- Demographics of the Central African Republic
- Manovo-Gounda St. Floris National Park
- Tondou Massif

=== Cities in the Central African Republic ===
- List of cities in the Central African Republic
- Abiras
- Alindao
- Bambari
- Bangassou
- Bangui
- Baoro
- Batangafo
- Berbérati
- Bimbo, Central African Republic
- Birao
- Boali
- Boda
- Bossangoa
- Bossembélé
- Bouar
- Bouca
- Bozoum
- Bria
- Carnot, Central African Republic
- Damara, Central African Republic
- Gambo, Central African Republic
- Gamboula
- Ippy
- Kabo
- Kaga-Bandoro
- Kembé
- Kouango
- Mbaïki
- Mobaye
- Mongoumba
- N'Délé
- Nola, Central African Republic
- Obo
- Ouadda
- Ouango
- Paoua
- Rafaï
- Sibut
- Zinga

=== Prefectures of the Central African Republic ===
- Prefectures of the Central African Republic
- Bamingui-Bangoran
- Basse-Kotto
- Haut-Mbomou
- Haute-Kotto
- Kemo-Gribingui
- Kémo
- Lobaye
- Mambéré-Kadéï
- Mbomou
- Nana-Grébizi
- Nana-Mambéré
- Ombella-M'Poko
- Ouaka
- Ouham
- Ouham-Pendé
- Sangha-Mbaéré
- Vakaga

=== Rivers of the Central African Republic ===
- Chari River
- Kadéï River
- Mbomou River
- Ouham River
- Sangha River
- Ubangi River

=== Central African Republic geography stubs ===
- Abiras
- Adamawa Plateau
- Alindao
- Bambari
- Bamingui-Bangoran
- Bangassou
- Baoro
- Basse-Kotto
- Batangafo
- Berbérati
- Bimbo, Central African Republic
- Birao
- Boali
- Boda
- Bossangoa
- Bossembélé
- Bouar
- Bouca
- Bozoum
- Bria
- Carnot, Central African Republic
- Chari River
- Damara, Central African Republic
- Gambo, Central African Republic
- Gamboula
- Haut-Mbomou
- Haute-Kotto
- Ippy
- Kabo
- Kaga-Bandoro
- Kembé
- Kemo-Gribingui
- Kémo
- Lobaye
- Logon River
- Mambéré-Kadéï
- Manovo-Gounda St. Floris National Park
- Mbaïki
- Mbomou
- Mbomou River
- Mobaye
- Mongoumba
- N'Délé
- Nana-Grébizi
- Nana-Mambéré
- Nola, Central African Republic
- Obo
- Ombella-M'Poko
- Ouadda
- Ouaka
- Ouango
- Oubangui-Chari
- Ouham
- Ouham River
- Ouham-Pendé
- Paoua
- Rafaï
- Sangha River
- Sangha-Mbaéré
- Sibut
- Template:CentralAfricanRepublic-geo-stub
- Tondou Massif
- Ubangi River
- Vakaga
- Zinga

== Government of the Central African Republic ==
- Foreign relations of the Central African Republic
- Heads of government of the Central African Republic (and Central African Empire)
- Heads of state of the Central African Republic (and Central African Empire)
- Military of the Central African Republic
- National Assembly of the Central African Republic

== History of the Central African Republic ==
- History of the Central African Republic
- Central African Empire
- Colonial heads of Central Africa
- French Congo
- French Equatorial Africa
- Heads of government of the Central African Republic (and Central African Empire)
- Oubangui-Chari

=== Elections in the Central African Republic ===
- Elections in the Central African Republic
- 2005 Central African Republic elections

== Law of the Central African Republic ==
- Gay rights in the Central African Republic

== Central African people ==
=== Central African politicians ===
- Bernard Ayandho
- Barthélemy Boganda
- Jean-Bédel Bokassa
- Simon Narcisse Bozanga
- François Bozizé
- David Dacko
- Anicet Georges Dologuélé
- Elisabeth Domitien
- Élie Doté
- Edouard Frank
- Célestin Gaombalet
- Michel Gbezera-Bria
- Abel Goumba
- André Kolingba
- Gabriel Koyambounou
- Enoch Derant Lakoué
- Jean-Pierre Lebouder
- Henri Maïdou
- Timothée Malendoma
- Jean-Luc Mandaba
- Charles Massi
- Jean-Paul Ngoupandé
- Ange-Félix Patassé
- Martin Ziguélé
- Template:CAR Presidents

=== Central African sportspeople ===
- Elvis Bomayako
- Romain Sato

== Politics of the Central African Republic ==
- Politics of the Central African Republic
- Foreign relations of the Central African Republic
- National Assembly of the Central African Republic

=== Political parties in the Central African Republic ===
- List of political parties in the Central African Republic
- Alliance for Democracy and Progress
- Central African Democratic Rally
- Central African Democratic Union
- Central African National Liberation Movement
- Democratic Evolution Movement of Central Africa
- Democratic Forum for Modernity
- Independent Grouping for Reflection
- Löndö Association
- MESAN
- Movement for Democracy and Independence
- Movement for the Liberation of the Central African People
- National Convergence "Kwa Na Kwa"
- National Unity Party (Central African Republic)
- Patriotic Front for Progress
- Republican Progressive Party
- Social Democratic Party (Central African Republic)

== Religion in Central African Republic ==
- Islam in the Central African Republic
- Roman Catholicism in the Central African Republic

== Central African society ==
- Demographics of the Central African Republic
- Fédération du scoutisme centrafricain
- Public holidays in the Central African Republic

=== Ethnic groups in the Central African Republic ===
- Baggara
- Baka (Cameroon and Gabon)
- Banda people
- Baya
- Mandja people
- Sara people
- Wodaabe

==== African Pygmies ====
- Aka people
- Baka people (Cameroon and Gabon)
- Ota Benga
- Efé people
- Pygmy
- Pygmy music
- Twa peoples

===== Pygmy mythology =====
- Bambuti mythology
- Khonvoum

== Transport in the Central African Republic ==
- Transport in the Central African Republic

== Central African Republic stubs ==
- Aja language (Nilo-Saharan)
- Alliance for Democracy and Progress
- Anicet Georges Dologuélé
- Barthelemy Boganda Stadium
- Barthélemy Boganda
- Baya
- Bernard Ayandho
- Central African Democratic Rally
- Central African Democratic Union
- Central African Empire
- Central African Football Federation
- Central African National Liberation Movement
- Central African Republic at the 1992 Summer Olympics
- Central African Republic at the 1996 Summer Olympics
- Central African Republic national football team
- Charles Massi
- Coat of arms of the Central African Republic
- Communications in the Central African Republic
- Confédération Syndicale des Travailleurs de Centrafrique
- Célestin Gaombalet
- Democratic Evolution Movement of Central Africa
- Democratic Forum for Modernity
- Edouard Frank
- Elections in the Central African Republic
- Elisabeth Domitien
- Enoch Derant Lakoué
- Fer language
- Flag of the Central African Republic
- French Equatorial Africa
- Fédération des Eclaireurs Scouts Centrafricains
- Gabriel Koyambounou
- Henri Maïdou
- Independent Grouping for Reflection
- Islam in the Central African Republic
- Jean-Luc Mandaba
- Jean-Pierre Lebouder
- LGBT rights in the Central African Republic (Gay rights)
- Löndö Association
- Mandja people
- Martin Ziguélé
- Michel Gbezera-Bria
- Movement for Democracy and Independence
- Movement for the Liberation of the Central African People
- National Confederation of Central African Workers
- National Convergence "Kwa Na Kwa"
- National Unity Party (Central African Republic)
- Patriotic Front for Progress
- People's Army for the Restoration of the Republic and Democracy
- Public holidays in the Central African Republic
- Republican Progressive Party
- Romain Sato
- Roman Catholicism in the Central African Republic
- Simon Narcisse Bozanga
- Social Democratic Party (Central African Republic)
- Sub-prefectures of the Central African Republic
- Template:CentralAfricanRepublic-stub
- Timothée Malendoma
- Transport in the Central African Republic
- Union of Central African Workers
- University of Bangui
- Élie Doté

== See also ==
- Outline of the Central African Republic
- Lists of country-related topics - similar lists for other countries
