= Outline of the Central African Republic =

Overview of and topical guide to the Central African Republic

The flag of the Central African Republic

The coat of arms of the Central African Republic

The location of the Central African Republic

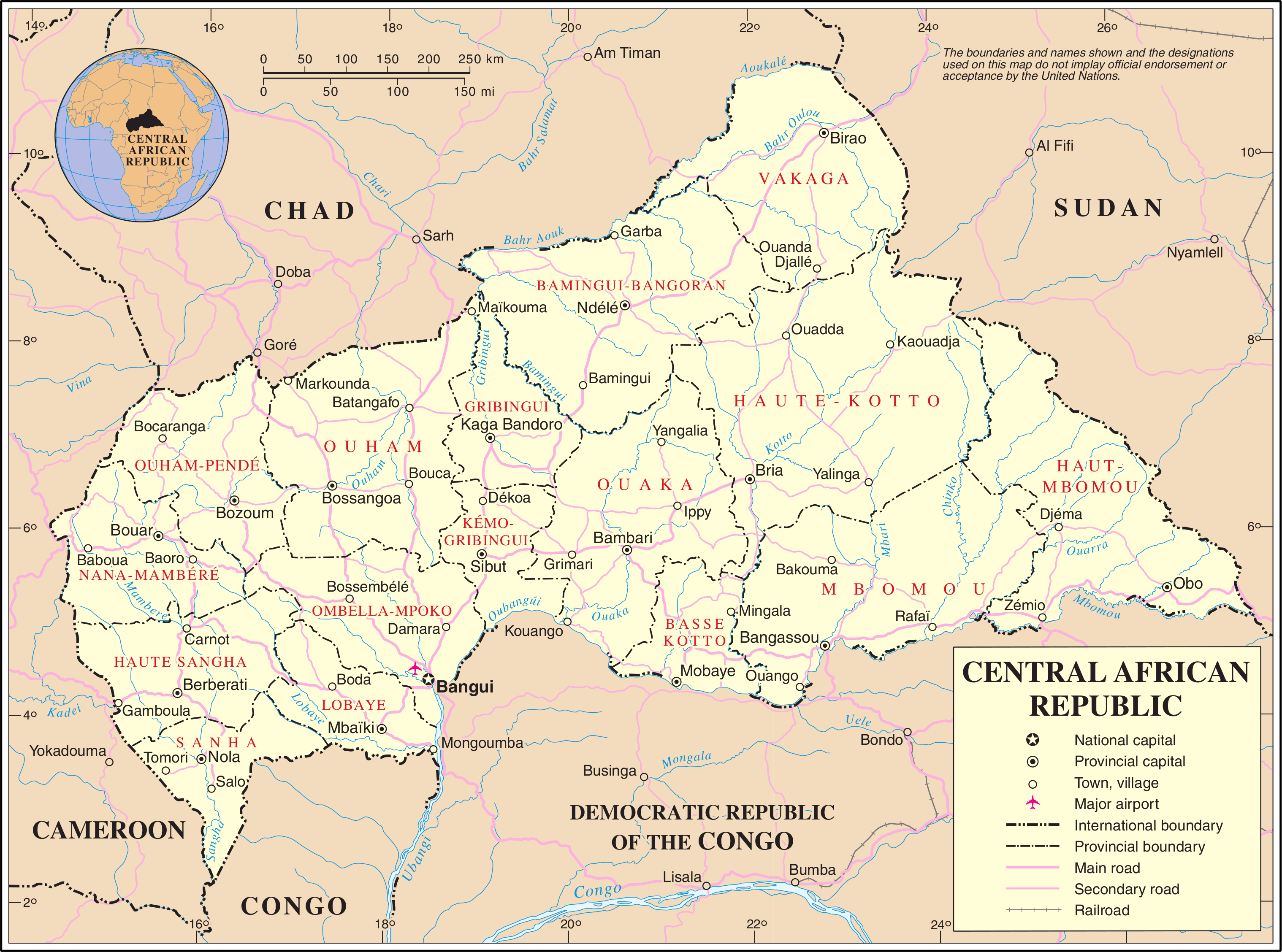
An enlargeable map of the Central African Republic

The following outline is provided as an overview of and topical guide to the Central African Republic:

Central African Republic – landlocked sovereign country located in Central Africa. The CAR borders Chad in the north, South Sudan in the east, Sudan in the north-east, the Republic of the Congo and the Democratic Republic of the Congo in the south, and Cameroon in the west. The Central African Republic Bush War began in 2004 and, despite a peace treaty in 2007 and another in 2011, fighting broke out between government, Muslim, and Christian factions in December 2012, leading to ethnic and religious cleansing and massive population displacement in 2013 and 2014. It is one of the poorest countries in the world.

== General reference ==
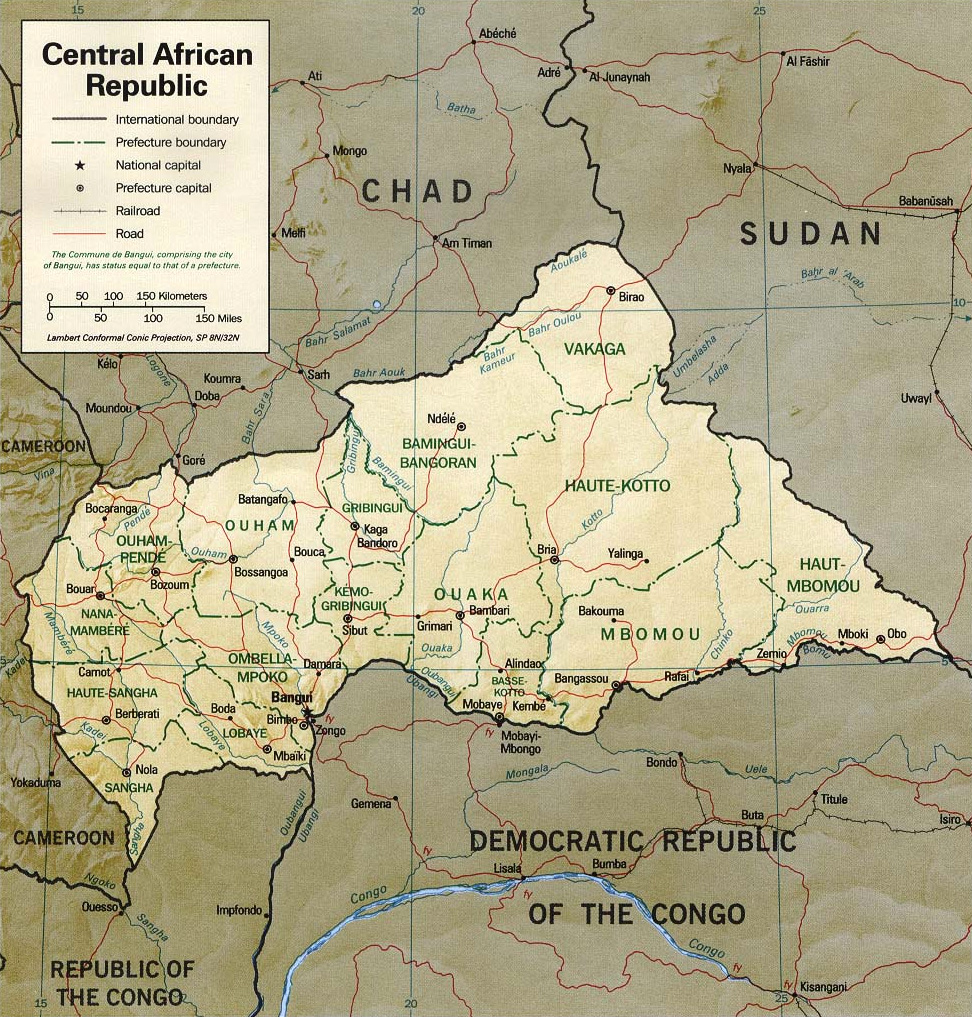
An enlargeable relief map of the Central African Republic

- Common English country name: The Central African Republic
- Official English country name: The Central African Republic
- Common endonym(s):
- Official endonym(s):
- Adjectival(s): Central African
- Demonym(s): Central African(s)
- ISO country codes: CF, CAF, 140
- ISO region codes: See ISO 3166-2:CF
- Internet country code top-level domain: .cf

== Geography of the Central African Republic ==
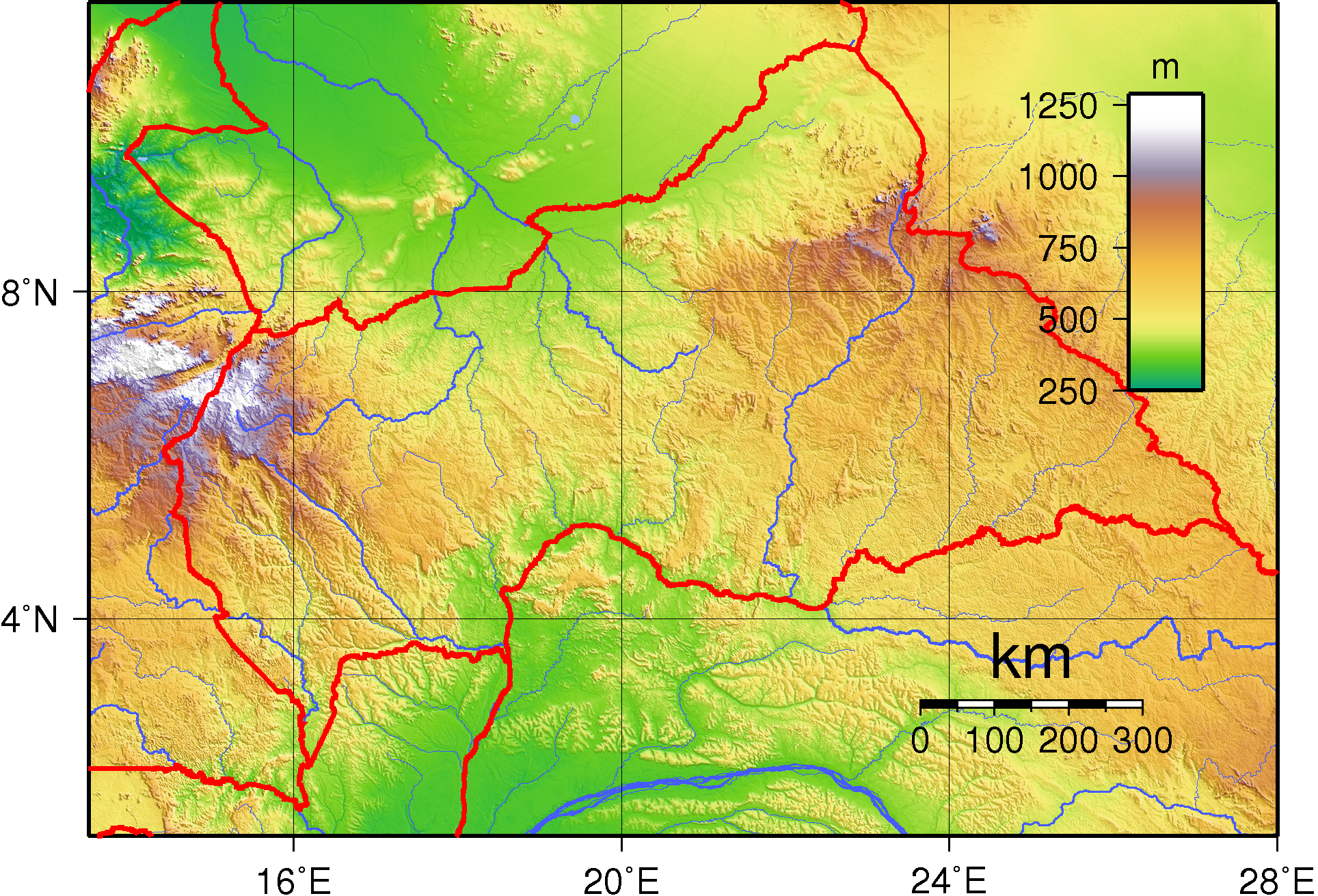
An enlargeable topographic map of the Central African Republic

Geography of the Central African Republic

- The Central African Republic is: a landlocked country
- Location:
  - Northern Hemisphere and Eastern Hemisphere
  - Africa
    - Central Africa
    - Middle Africa
  - Time zone: West Africa Time (UTC+01)
  - Extreme points of the Central African Republic
    - High: Mont Ngaoui 1,420 m (4,659 ft)
    - Low: Ubangi River 335 m (1,099 ft)
  - Land boundaries: 5,203 km

Democratic Republic of the Congo 1,577 km
Chad 1,197 km
Sudan 175 km
South Sudan 990 km
Cameroon 797 km
Republic of the Congo 467 km

- Coastline: none

- Population of the Central African Republic: 4,216,666(2007) - 124th most populous country
- Area of the Central African Republic: 622,984 square kilometres (240,535 sq mi) - 43rd largest country
- Atlas of the Central African Republic

=== Environment of the Central African Republic ===
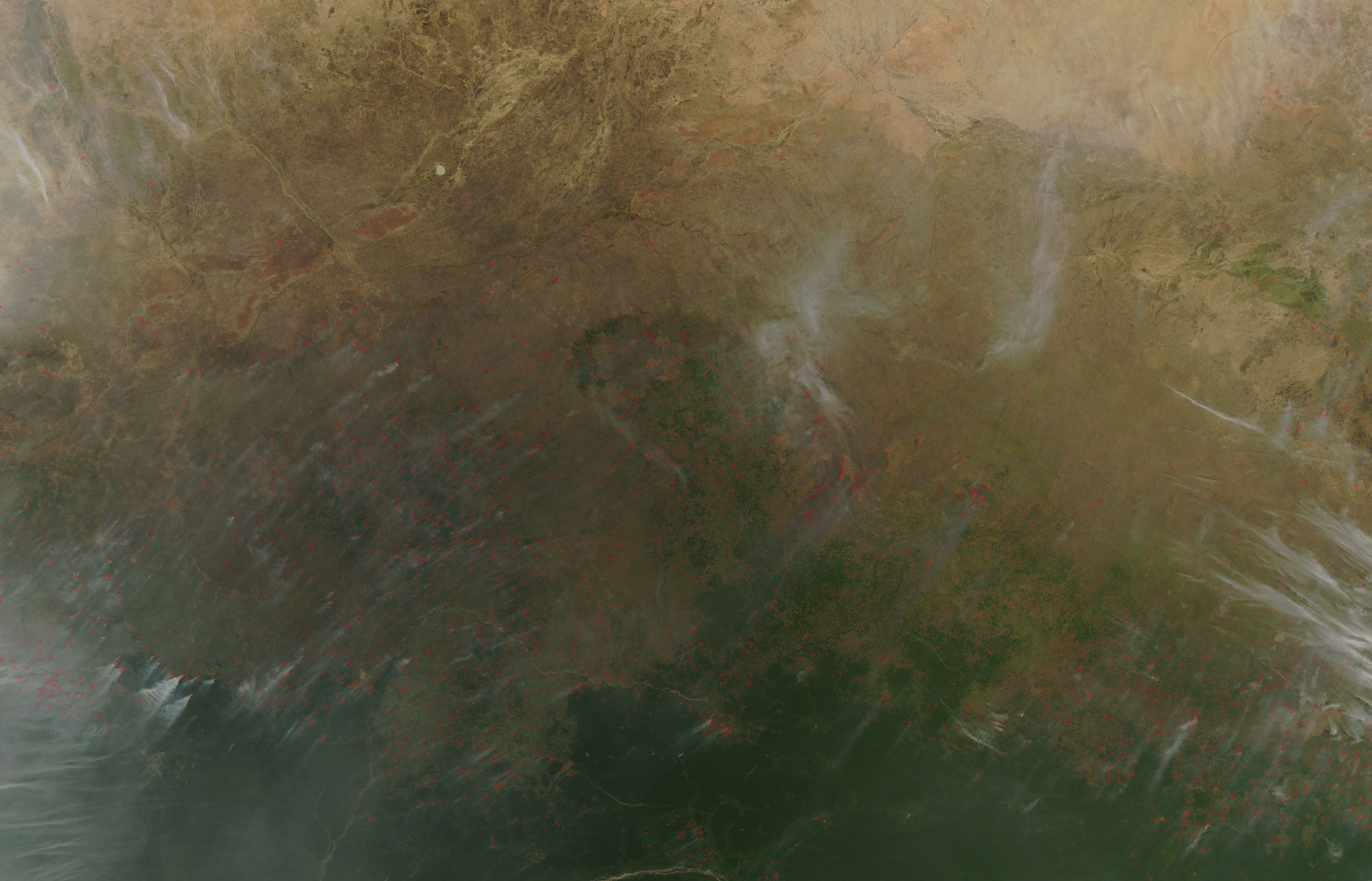
An enlargeable satellite image of the Central African Republic

- Climate of the Central African Republic
- Ecoregions in the Central African Republic
- Wildlife of the Central African Republic
  - Fauna of the Central African Republic
    - Birds of the Central African Republic
    - Mammals of the Central African Republic

==== Natural geographic features of the Central African Republic ====
- Glaciers in the Central African Republic: none
- Mountains of the Central African Republic
- Rivers of the Central African Republic
- World Heritage Sites in the Central African Republic

=== Regions of the Central African Republic ===
Regions of the Central African Republic

==== Ecoregions of the Central African Republic ====
List of ecoregions in the Central African Republic

==== Administrative divisions of the Central African Republic ====
Administrative divisions of the Central African Republic

- Prefectures of the Central African Republic
  - Sub-prefectures of the Central African Republic

===== Prefectures of the Central African Republic =====
Prefectures of the Central African Republic

===== Sub-prefectures of the Central African Republic =====
Sub-prefectures of the Central African Republic

===== Municipalities of the Central African Republic =====
- Capital of the Central African Republic: Bangui
- Cities of the Central African Republic

=== Demography of the Central African Republic ===
Demographics of the Central African Republic

== Government and politics of the Central African Republic ==
Politics of the Central African Republic

- Form of government: presidential republic
- Capital of the Central African Republic: Bangui
- Elections in the Central African Republic
- Political parties in the Central African Republic

=== Branches of the government of the Central African Republic ===
Government of the Central African Republic

==== Executive branch of the government of the Central African Republic ====
- Head of state: President of the Central African Republic
- Head of government: President of the Central African Republic
- Central African Republic Council of Ministers

==== Legislative branch of the government of the Central African Republic ====
- National Assembly of the Central African Republic (unicameral)

==== Judicial branch of the government of the Central African Republic ====
Court system of the Central African Republic

=== Foreign relations of the Central African Republic ===
Foreign relations of the Central African Republic

- Diplomatic missions in the Central African Republic
- Diplomatic missions of the Central African Republic

==== International organization membership ====
The Central African Republic is a member of:

- African, Caribbean, and Pacific Group of States (ACP)
- African Development Bank Group (AfDB)
- African Union (AU)
- Conference des Ministres des Finances des Pays de la Zone Franc (FZ)
- Development Bank of Central African States (BDEAC)
- Economic and Monetary Community of Central Africa (CEMAC)
- Food and Agriculture Organization (FAO)
- Group of 77 (G77)
- International Atomic Energy Agency (IAEA)
- International Bank for Reconstruction and Development (IBRD)
- International Civil Aviation Organization (ICAO)
- International Criminal Court (ICCt)
- International Criminal Police Organization (Interpol)
- International Development Association (IDA)
- International Federation of Red Cross and Red Crescent Societies (IFRCS)
- International Finance Corporation (IFC)
- International Fund for Agricultural Development (IFAD)
- International Labour Organization (ILO)
- International Monetary Fund (IMF)
- International Olympic Committee (IOC)
- International Red Cross and Red Crescent Movement (ICRM)
- International Telecommunication Union (ITU)
- International Telecommunications Satellite Organization (ITSO)
- International Trade Union Confederation (ITUC)
- Multilateral Investment Guarantee Agency (MIGA)
- Nonaligned Movement (NAM)
- Organisation internationale de la Francophonie (OIF)
- Organisation of Islamic Cooperation (OIC) (observer)
- Organisation for the Prohibition of Chemical Weapons (OPCW)
- United Nations (UN)
- United Nations Conference on Trade and Development (UNCTAD)
- United Nations Educational, Scientific, and Cultural Organization (UNESCO)
- United Nations Industrial Development Organization (UNIDO)
- Universal Postal Union (UPU)
- World Confederation of Labour (WCL)
- World Customs Organization (WCO)
- World Federation of Trade Unions (WFTU)
- World Health Organization (WHO)
- World Intellectual Property Organization (WIPO)
- World Meteorological Organization (WMO)
- World Tourism Organization (UNWTO)
- World Trade Organization (WTO)

=== Law and order in the Central African Republic ===
Law of the Central African Republic

- Constitution of the Central African Republic
- Human rights in the Central African Republic
  - LGBT rights in the Central African Republic
  - Freedom of religion in the Central African Republic
- Law enforcement in the Central African Republic

=== Military of the Central African Republic ===
Military of the Central African Republic

- Command
  - Commander-in-chief:
- Forces
  - Army of the Central African Republic
  - Navy of the Central African Republic
  - Air Force of the Central African Republic

=== Local government in the Central African Republic ===
Local government in the Central African Republic

== History of the Central African Republic ==
- History of the Central African Republic

=== History by subject ===
- History of rail transport in the Central African Republic
- Postage stamps and postal history of the Central African Republic

== Culture of the Central African Republic ==
Culture of the Central African Republic

- Centrafrican cuisine
- Languages of the Central African Republic
- Media in the Central African Republic
- National symbols of the Central African Republic
  - Coat of arms of the Central African Republic
  - Flag of the Central African Republic
  - National anthem of the Central African Republic
- People of the Central African Republic
  - Gbaya people
  - Mandja people
- Public holidays in the Central African Republic
- Religion in the Central African Republic
  - Christianity in the Central African Republic
    - Baptist Churches of the Central African Republic
    - Roman Catholicism in the Central African Republic
  - Hinduism in the Central African Republic
  - Islam in the Central African Republic
- World Heritage Sites in the Central African Republic

=== Art in the Central African Republic ===
- Museums in the Central African Republic
- Music of the Central African Republic

=== Sports in the Central African Republic ===
Sports in the Central African Republic

- Football in the Central African Republic
- Central African Republic at the Olympics

== Economy and infrastructure of the Central African Republic ==
Economy of the Central African Republic

- Economic rank, by nominal GDP (2025): 168th (one hundred and sixty-eighth)
- Agriculture in the Central African Republic
- Banking in the Central African Republic
- Communications in the Central African Republic
  - Internet in the Central African Republic
- Companies of the Central African Republic
- Currency of the Central African Republic: Franc
  - ISO 4217: XAF
- Energy in the Central African Republic
- Health care in the Central African Republic
- Mining in the Central African Republic
- Tourism in the Central African Republic
- Transport in the Central African Republic
  - Airports in the Central African Republic
  - Rail transport in the Central African Republic

== Education in the Central African Republic ==
- Education in the Central African Republic

== See also ==
Central African Republic

- List of Central African Republic-related topics
- All pages with titles beginning with Central African Republic
- All pages with titles beginning with Central Africa
- All pages with titles beginning with Central African
- All pages with titles containing Central African Republic
- All pages with titles containing Central Africa
- All pages with titles containing Central African
- List of international rankings
- Member state of the United Nations
- Outline of Africa
- Outline of geography
