= Zinga =

Zinga may refer to:

== Places ==
- Zinga, Burma—in Kyaukki Township, Bango division
- Zinga, Haut-Mbomou in Obo district, Haut-Mbomou region of the Central African Republic
- Zinga, Lobaye in Mongoumba district, Lobaye region of the Central African Republic
- Zinga, Democratic Republic of the Congo in Kivu region
- Zinga, Ghana in Chiana-Paga district, Upper East Ghana
- Zinga, Tanzania in Bagamoyo, Pwani Region
- Zinga, historical region and frazione of Casabona, Italy

== People with the surname ==
- Andrea Zinga, American politician and journalist
- Queen Nzinga (pronounced Zinga) ruler of what later became Angola an important 17th century ruler

== Other uses ==
- Zinga (leafhopper), a genus of leafhoppers in the tribe Erythroneurini
- Zinga virus, a Rift Valley fever strain
- Zinga, the film Song of Freedom's black dockworker character.
- Zinga, Holiday World & Splashin' Safari's eight-story tall water slide
- Zynga, a social network game developer.
- Nizatidine, by the trade name Zinga

== See also ==
- Nzinga (disambiguation)
