= CNTC =

CNTC may refer to:

- China Tobacco, the state tobacco monopoly in China
- National Confederation of Central African Workers (Confédération Nationale des Travailleurs de Centrafrique)
