= List of people on the postage stamps of Central African Republic =

List of people on Central African Republic stamps

This is a (minimal) list of people on postage stamps of the Central African Republic.

== A ==
- Otto Wilhelm Hermann von Abich (2011)
- Ivan Aivazovsky (2011)
- Alexander Alekhine (2011)
- Muhammad Ali (2018)
- Roald Amundsen (2018)
- Andrey Avinoff (2011)

== B ==
- Johann Sebastian Bach (2011)
- Olave Baden-Powell (2011)
- Robert Baden-Powell (2011)
- Brigitte Bardot (2011)
- Florence Bascom (2011)
- Ruth Elizabeth Becker (2011)
- Elizabeth Blackburn (2011)
- Timo Boll (2011)
- Mikhail Botvinnik (2011)
- François Boucher (2011)
- Johannes Brahms (2011)
- Pierre Marie Auguste Broussonet (2011)
- Arthur Henry Reginald Buller (2011)

== C ==
- Catherine, Duchess of Cambridge (as "Prince William avec sa femme") (2011)
- Evelyn Cheesman (2011)
- Jacques Chirac (2011)
- Bill Clinton (1996)

== D ==
- Dalai Lama (1996)
- Edgar Degas (2011)
- Ignacy Domeyko (2011)
- Albrecht Dürer (2011)
- Anthony van Dyck (2011)

== E ==
- Robert G. Edwards (2011)

== F ==
- Jean-Henri Fabre (2011)
- Alexandra Feodorovna (2018)
- Dian Fossey (2011)
- Pope Francis (2018)

== G ==
- Yuri Gagarin (2011)
- Mahatma Gandhi (1996, 2011)
- Charles de Gaulle (2011)
- Andre Geim (2011)
- Dorothy Gibson (2011)
- Vincent van Gogh (2011)

== H ==
- Eva Hart (2011)
- Paul von Hindenburg (2018)

== J ==
- Michael Jackson (1995, 2018)
- Pope John Paul II (2011)
  - as Saint John Paul II (2018)

== K ==
- Anatoly Karpov (2011)
- John F. Kennedy (1996, 2018)
- Coretta Scott King (2018)
- Martin Luther King Jr. (1996, 2018)

== L ==
- Jean-Baptiste Lamarck (2011)
- Pierre André Latreille (2011)
- Jean Jules Linden (2011)
- Wang Liqin (2011)
- David Livingstone (2018)
- Louis XIV (2018)
- Marinus van der Lubbe (2018)

== M ==
- Nelson Mandela (1996, 2018)
- Felix Mendelssohn (2011)
- Auguste Michel-Lévy (2011)
- Michelangelo (2011)
- Amedeo Modigliani (2011)
- Claude Monet (2011)
- Marilyn Monroe (2011)
- Paul Morphy (2011)
- Wolfgang Amadeus Mozart (2011)
- William Murrill (2011)

== N ==
- Edmond Navratil (2011)
- Michel Marcel Navratil (as Lolo Navratil) (2011)
- Nicholas II of Russia (2018)
- Ding Ning (2011)

== O ==
- Eleanor Anne Ormerod (2011)

== P ==
- Camille Pissarro (2011)
- Georges Pompidou (2011)
- Elvis Presley (2011)
- Léon Abel Provancher (2011)

== R ==
- Raphael (as Raffaello Sanzio) (2011)
- Rembrandt van Rijn (2011)
- Pierre-Auguste Renoir (2011)
- Royal Family of Monaco:
  - Rainier III, Prince of Monaco (2018)
  - Princess Grace (2018)
  - Princess Stéphanie of Monaco (2018)
  - Caroline, Princess of Hanover (2018)
  - Albert II, Prince of Monaco (2018)
- Peter Paul Rubens (2011)

== S ==
- Nicolas Sarkozy (2011)
- Romy Schneider (2011)
- Fred Jay Seaver (2011)
- Liu Shiwen (2011)
- Alfred Sisley (2011)
- Vitaly Smirnov (2018)
- Diana, Princess of Wales, as Diana Spencer (2011)
- Vyacheslav Sreznevsky (2018)

== T ==
- Mother Teresa (1996)
- Titian (as Tiziano Vecelli) (2011)
- Joseph Pitton de Tournefort (2011)
- Leonid Tyagachev (2018)

== W ==
- Elsie Maud Wakefield (2011)
- Prince William, Duke of Cambridge (as Prince William) (2011)

== Y ==
- Ada Yonath (2011)

== Z ==
- Mao Zedong (2018)
- Alexander Zhukov (2018)
