= Ouangolodougou =

Ouangolodougou may refer to:

- Ouangolodougou, Burkina Faso
- Ouangolodougou, Ivory Coast
- Ouangolodougou Department, Ivory Coast

== See also ==
- Ouango (disambiguation)
