= Confédération Syndicale des Travailleurs de Centrafrique =

Trade union in the Central African Republic

CSTC
- Confédération Syndicale des Travailleurs de Centrafrique
- Headquarters: Bangui, Central African Republic
- Location: Central African Republic
- Key people: Kpokol Sabin, secretary general
- Affiliations: International Trade Union Confederation

The Confédération Syndicale des Travailleurs de Centrafrique is a trade union centre in the Central African Republic.

It is affiliated with the International Trade Union Confederation.
