= Annuaires Afrique =

- Industry: Publishing (online)
- Products: On-line directories
- Website: http://www.africaphonebooks.com/

Annuaires Afrique (French), or AfricaPhonebooks (English), is a group of African online telephone directories owned by The Global Super Pages. It currently serves the following areas:

- Benin
- Burkina Faso
- Burundi
- Cameroon
- Chad
- Central African Republic
- Congo (Brazzaville)
- Côte d'Ivoire
- Djibouti
- Equatorial Guinea
- Gabon
- Guinea
- Mali
- Mauritania
- Niger
- Rwanda
- Senegal
- Togo

Service is planned for the following countries.

- Algeria
- Angola
- Comoros
- French Polynesia
- Madagascar
- Mauritius
- Morocco
- Tunisia

The Global Super Pages' Asian service now comprises Cambodia, Greater Bangkok, Laos, Malaysia and Myanmar.

== See also ==
- Blue pages
- White pages
- Yellow pages
