= List of ecoregions in the Central African Republic =

The following is a list of ecoregions in the Central African Republic, according to the Worldwide Fund for Nature (WWF).

== Terrestrial ecoregions ==
by major habitat type

=== Tropical and subtropical moist broadleaf forests ===
- Northeastern Congolian lowland forests
- Northwestern Congolian lowland forests
- Western Congolian swamp forests

=== Tropical and subtropical grasslands, savannas, and shrublands ===
- East Sudanian savanna
- Northern Congolian forest–savanna mosaic
- Sahelian Acacia savanna

== Freshwater ecoregions ==
by bioregion

=== Congo ===
- Sangha
- Sudanic Congo (Oubangi)

=== Nilo-Sudan ===
- Lake Chad Catchment
