= People's Army for the Restoration of the Republic and Democracy =

People's Army for the Restoration of the Republic and Democracy or APRD ( L’Armée Populaire pour la restauration de la République et démocratie) was a rebel group operating in the northwestern parts of Central African Republic (CAR) during the Central African Bush War.

== History ==
APRD was created in an attempt to overthrow former President of CAR, François Bozizé. APRD has claimed responsibility for two major attacks, contributing to the influx of Central African refugees in southern Chad. During mid-October 2006, fighting between APRD and government troops escalated, and on October 15, the International Federation of Human Rights Leagues (FIDH) reported that 70,000 refugees have fled the CAR to Chad and Cameroon. FIDH official, Marceau Sivieudehe, stated that: "It's obvious that the civilian population is the main victim of such a chaotic situation ... [they] are living in an absolutely precarious situation." He criticized the lack of attention the crisis in the CAR has been receiving from the international community and warned of a subregional collapse that could impact the CAR, Chad, and Cameroon.

APDR held territory during the Bush war

== 2008 peace agreement ==
On 9 April, 2008 APRD signed a ceasefire and peace agreement with the François Bozizés government, in Libreville. After the peace deal political head of the APDR Jean-Jacques Demafouth declared that the government will grant amnesty to all APDR fighters and the rebels will stay in camps "pending their disarmament, demobilization or integration into the army."

In 2009 APRD released nearly 200 child soldiers in accordance with the peace agreement.

== See also ==
- Chadian-Sudanese conflict
