= Nzinga =

Nzinga may refer to:

== People ==
- Nzinga of Ndongo and Matamba (c. 1583–1663), Central African warrior queen
- João I of Kongo, also known as Nzinga a Nkuwu or Nkuwu Nzinga
- Afonso I of Kongo (c. 1456–1542 or 1543), also known as Mvemba a Nzinga or Nzinga Mbemba
- Njinga a Mona, 17th Century military commander and claimant to the throne of Matamba
- Nzinga Blake (born 1981), American/Sierra Leonean actress
- Daniel Ntongi-Nzinga (born 1946), peace activist and Christian leader in Angola
- Héritier Luvumbu Nzinga (born 1994), Congolese footballer

== Places ==
- Nzinga, Nyanga, Gabon, in Nyanga Province
- Nzinga, Ogooué-Ivindo, Gabon, in the province of Ogooué-Ivindo
- Nzinga, Central African Republic, a port in the Central African Republic
- Nzinga Tchi, in Nyanga Province, Gabon

== Other uses ==
- Nzinga (leafhopper), a leafhopper genus in the tribe Erythroneurini
