= Movement for Democracy and Independence =

Political party in the Central African Republic

The Movement for Democracy and Independence (French: Mouvement pour la Démocratie et l'Indépendance, MDI) was a political party in the Central African Republic.

== History ==
Established on 17 January 1981, the MDI was led by François Gueret, who had served in David Dacko's cabinet, but resigned. The MDI was fiercely anti-Soviet and somewhat pro-China. In the 1981 presidential elections the MDI nominated Gueret as its candidate, although he did not contest the elections.

The party was banned on 2 September 1981.
