= Löndö Association =

The Löndö Association (French: Association Löndö, AL) was a political party in the Central African Republic led by Henri Pouzère.

== History ==
The party was established around 2004. In the 2005 general elections it won a single seat in the National Assembly.
