= Elvis Bomayako =

Central African Republic basketball player

Elvis Bomayako is a basketball administrator from the Central African Republic. In January 2009, Bomayako was elected as President of the Central African Republic Basketball Federation. Prior to his presidency, he was the president of basketball club Hit Trésor. He resigned his position on Sept 18, 2011, in the wake of denunciations by players about the Federation's legitimacy.
