= Daniel Ntongi-Nzinga =

Angolan politician

Daniel Ntongi-Nzinga (born 1946) is a peace activist and Christian leader in Angola.

Ntoni-Nzinga studied at the University of Leeds before co-founding the Grupo Angolan de Reflexao para Paz (GARP), and the Inter-Ecclesiastical Committee for Peace in Angola (COIEPA) in April 2000, organizations advocating an end to the Angolan Civil War (1975-2002). He previously served as the Executive Secretary of the Evangelical Baptist church in Angola and as Secretary General of the Angolan Council of Churches.
