= LGBTQ rights in the Central African Republic =

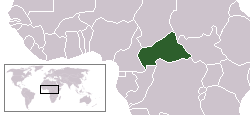
- Central African Republic
- Legal status: Legal
- Gender identity: No
- Military: No
- Discrimination protections: Limited protection based on sexual orientation (personal data)

Family rights
- Recognition of relationships: No
- Restrictions: Same-sex marriage constitutionally banned since 2016
- Adoption: No

Lesbian, gay, bisexual, transgender, and queer (LGBTQ) people in the Central African Republic face legal and social challenges not experienced by non-LGBTQ residents. Both male and female types of same-sex sexual activity are legal in the Central African Republic, but public displays of affection between people of the same-sex is criminalized. LGBTQ persons still face discrimination among the broader population.

The Central African Republic was one of the few African states that signed a "joint statement on ending acts of violence and related human rights violations based on sexual orientation and gender identity" at the United Nations, condemning violence and discrimination against LGBTQ people.

== Laws regarding same-sex sexual activity ==
Same-sex sexual activity is legal. However, according to the U.S. Department of State's 2012 human rights report,

The penal code criminalizes "public expression of love" between persons of the same sex is imprisonment for six months to two years or a fine of between 150,000 and 600,000 CFA francs ($300 and $1,200). When one of the participants is a child, the adult may be sentenced to two to five years' imprisonment or a fine of 100,000 to 800,000 CFA francs ($200 and $1,600); however, there were no reports that police arrested or detained persons [in 2012] under these provisions.

== Recognition of same sex relationships and transgender people ==
There is no legal recognition of same-sex couples. Same-sex marriage is constitutionally banned as marriage is defined in Article 7 of the Constitution as "the union between one man and one woman ... Family and marriage are under the protection of the State." There is no legal gender recognition.

== Adoption and family planning ==
According to a website of the French government, single and married people are eligible to adopt children. The website does not say whether single LGBTQ people are disqualified or not.

== Discrimination protections ==
There are no laws protecting LGBTQ people from discrimination in areas such as health, employment, education, and access to goods and services. However, Law 24-001 on the Protection of Personal Data protects sexual orientation as sensitive data. Article 17 states "Any processing of sensitive data is prohibited due to risks of discrimination or infringement of personal freedoms."

Openly LGBTQ people cannot serve in the military. There are no laws against psychology or medical practices being used as conversion therapy on LGBTQ people. While there is no ban on surgeries intended to normalize the bodies of intersex infants on intersex infants, there were no reports of them occurring in 2023.

== Living conditions ==
The U.S. Department of State's 2012 Human Rights Report found that, "societal discrimination against lesbian, gay, bisexual and transgender persons was entrenched, and many citizens attributed the existence of homosexuality to undue Western influence." Cultural stigma continues to persist. The 2023 Human Rights Report acknowledges that religious preach conversion; however, this is rarely enacted since people keep their LGBTQ identities hidden. LGBTQ people face discrimination in education, healthcare, and employment.

Due to the criminalization of public same-sex affection along with cultural stigma, the LGBTQ community has to conceal itself. Maintaining queer relationships under these conditions is dangerous. While there were no reports of violence against LGBTQ people, it is unclear if this is due to a lack of incidents or a victims not reporting it.

According to the U.S Department of State, there were no LGBTQ organizations within the country. However, a local LGBTQ organization called Alternatives Centrafrique submitted reports for the Unversial Periodic Review's third and fourth cycle. According to its fourth cycle report, this organization was founded in 2009 and registered in 2020. Alternatives Centrafrique has documented cases of people in the Central African Republic being arrested due to false accusations of same-sex intercourse. The organization also says that LGBTQ people in the country have experienced mistreatment and torture by law enforcement.

Being diagnosed with HIV (human immunodeficiency virus) is used as a source of stigmatization in the work place leading to harassment, blackmail, and firings. The country's National HIV Plan from 2016 to 2020 recognized men who have sex with men as a key population for the Global Fund Project to focus on.

== Summary table ==
Same-sex sexual activity legal	Yes (Always legal)
Equal age of consent	Yes (Always equal)
Anti-discrimination laws in hate speech and violence	No
Anti-discrimination laws in employment	No
Anti-discrimination laws in the provision of goods and services	No
Anti-discrimination laws in all other areas (Incl. indirect discrimination, hate speech)	Yes / No (Limited protection based on sexual orientation in personal data)
Same-sex marriage	No (Same-sex marriage constitutionally banned since 2016)
Recognition of same-sex couples	No
Step-child adoption by same-sex couples	No
Joint adoption by same-sex couples	No
Gays and lesbians allowed to serve openly in the military	No
Right to change legal gender	No
Access to IVF for lesbians	No
Commercial surrogacy for gay male couples	No
MSMs allowed to donate blood	No

== See also ==
- Human rights in the Central African Republic
- LGBTQ rights in Africa
