= Democratic Evolution Movement of Central Africa =

Political party in the Central African Republic

Democratic Evolution Movement of Central Africa (French: Mouvement d'Evolution Démocratique de l'Afrique Centrale, MEDAC) was a political party in the Central African Republic led by Abel Goumba.

== History ==
MEDAC was founded in 1960 by Goumba and Pierre Maléombho, the former president of the National Assembly who was ousted by Dacko, after they left the Movement for the Social Evolution of Black Africa.

In late 1960 MEDAC mobilized protests against the increasingly authoritarian rule of David Dacko. Goumba became more and more critical of the French backing of Dacko. At a parliamentary session, MEDAC MPs staged a walk-out following accusations by Dacko that MEDAC was supporting tribalism. On 23 December MEDAC was dissolved by the government. Goumba's parliamentary immunity was repealed, and together with seven other MEDAC leaders he was arrested.
