= National Confederation of Central African Workers =

CNTC
- National Confederation of Central African Workers
- Confédération Nationale des Travailleurs de Centrafrique
- Headquarters: Bangui, Central African Republic
- Location: Central African Republic
- Key people: Jean-Richard Sandos Oualanga, secretary general
- Affiliations: International Trade Union Confederation

The National Confederation of Central African Workers is a trade union centre in the Central African Republic.

It is affiliated with the International Trade Union Confederation.
