= Music of the Central African Republic =

Music of the Central African Republic includes many different forms. Western rock and pop music, as well as Afrobeat, soukous and other genres have become popular nationwide. The sanza is a popular instrument.

The Pygmies have a complex folk music tradition. Polyphony and counterpoint are common components, as is a varied rhythmic structure. The trumpet-based music of the Bandas has also gained some popularity outside the area due to its jazzy structure. The Ngbaka use an unusual instrument called a mbela, which is made with an arched branch and a string strung between the two ends and held in front of the musician's mouth. When the string is struck, the mouth is used to amplify and modulate the tone. Instruments similar to the mbela are sometimes considered the oldest ancestors of all string instruments.

The national anthem of the Central African Republic is "La Renaissance". This song, which has been the anthem since 1960, was written by Barthélémy Boganda (words), the first President of the Central African Republic, and Herbert Pepper, who also composed the melody for the Senegalese national anthem.

== Popular music ==
Popular music in the Central African Republic generally comes from the music of the Democratic Republic of the Congo or elsewhere in Africa; however, Latin, European and American pop are also common, as is jazz and rock and roll. African folktales are very popular as well, like the Panda.

== Folk music ==
=== Banda music ===
The Banda people have produced some modern popular music, using a trumpet-based kind of jazzy music which UNESCO has called one of the "great musicological discoveries of our century". Banda folk music includes the ongo, a kind of trumpet made from wood or antelope horn. Ongos are used in ceremonies and rituals, including adolescent initiation rites, in polyphonic ensembles of eighteen trumpets.

=== Pygmy music ===
Formally Pygmy music consists of at most only four parts, and can be described as an, "ostinato with variations," or similar to a passacaglia, in that it is cyclical. In fact it is based on repetition of periods of equal length, which each singer divides using different rhythmic figures specific to different repertoires and songs. This interesting case of ethnomusicology and ethnomathematics creates a detailed surface and endless variations of not only the same period repeated, but the same piece of music. As in some Balinese gamelan these patterns are based on a super-pattern which is never heard. The Pygmies themselves do not learn or think of their music in this theoretical framework, but learn the music growing up.

Pygmy styles include liquindi, or water drumming, and instruments like the bow harp (ieta), ngombi (harp zither) and limbindi (a string bow) (Abram).
