= Public holidays in the Central African Republic =

This is a list of public holidays in the Central African Republic

== Public holidays ==
Date	English name	Comments
January 1	New Year's Day	
March 29	Barthelemy Boganda Day	Date of the first prime minister's death in 1959
March or April	Easter Monday	Day after Easter
May 1	Labour Day	
May or June	Ascension Day	
May or June	Whit Monday	Day after Pentecost
June 30	General Prayer Day	Non-denominational although 60% Protestant and 90% Christian.
August 13	Independence Day	From France, 1960
August 15	Assumption Day	
November 1	All Saints Day	
December 1	National Day	Commemorates the anniversary of the Central African Republic becoming an autonomous territory within the French Community in 1958.
December 25	Christmas Day	
1 Shawwal	Korité	Muslim feast of Breaking the Fast.
10 Dhu al-Hijjah	Tabaski	Muslim feast of the Sacrifice.
