= Ouango =

Ouango may refer to:

- Ouango, Mbomou, Central African Republic
- Ouango River, New Caledonia

== See also ==
- Gambo-Ouango, Central African Republic
- Ouangolodougou (disambiguation)
