= Zinga, Democratic Republic of the Congo =

Zinga
- Location in the Democratic Republic of the Congo
- Coordinates: 4°21′S 26°58′E
- Country: Democratic Republic of the Congo
- Province: Maniema Province

Zinga is a village in the Democratic Republic of the Congo in the Maniema Province.
