= Islam in the Central African Republic =

Islam accounts for approximately 8.9% (750,000 people) of the population of the Central African Republic, making it the second largest organized religion in the country after Christianity (90%). The vast majority of Muslims are Sunni of the Maliki school of Islamic jurisprudence (fiqh). Most Central African Muslims live in the north-east, near the border with predominantly-Muslim Chad and Sudan.

== History ==
Islam arrived in Central African Republic in the 17th century as part of the expansion of the Saharan and Nile River slave routes. Islam began spreading in the region from the 1870's onwards. Conversion was a varied process that included the presence of Muslim merchants, the economic expansion of sultanates in nearby Sudan and Chad into the area, and the cultural proximity of locals with Muslims. The growth of Islam continued during the French colonial period but witnessed setbacks due to a lack of religious intstitutions in the region.

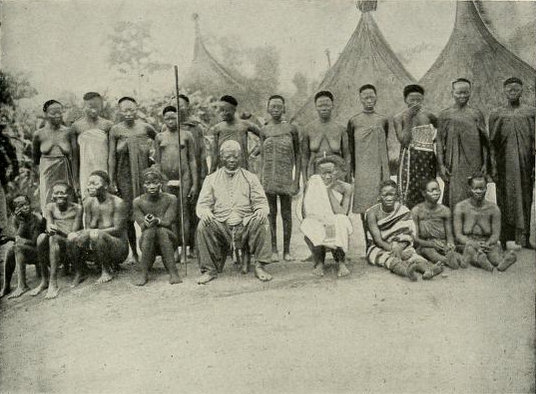
The Sultan of Bangassou and his wives in 1906.

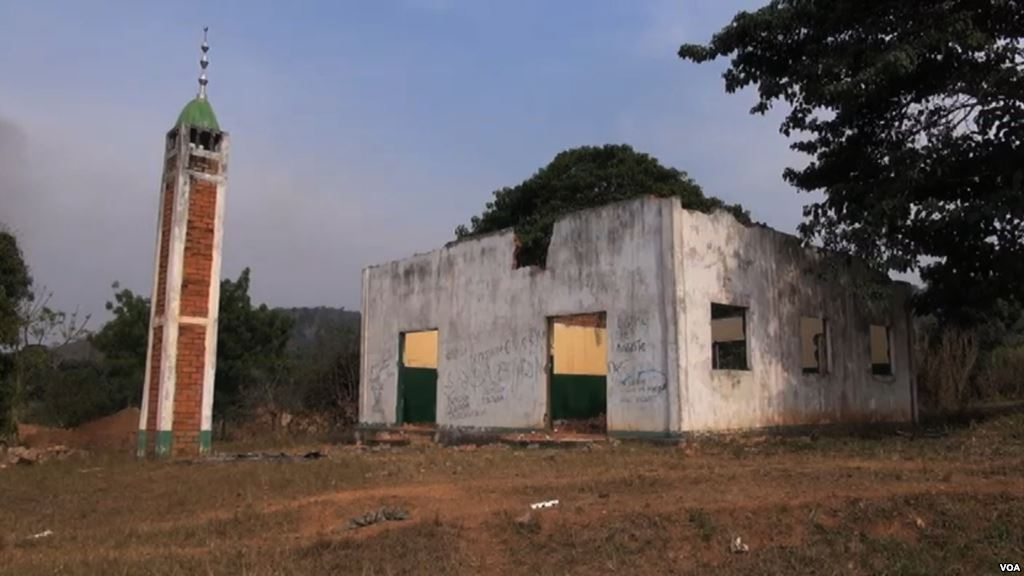
A destroyed mosque in Boali in 2014.

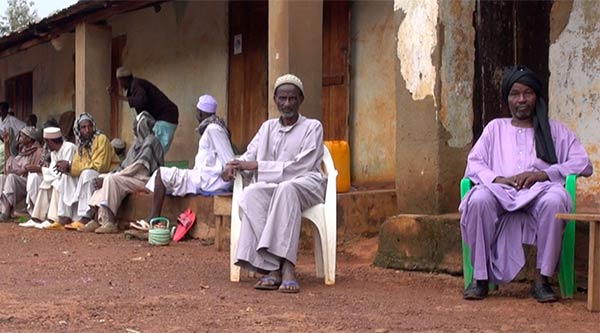
Muslims in Boda, September 2014

== See also ==
- Religion in the Central African Republic
- Central African Republic civil war
  - Séléka CPSK-CPJP-UFDR
  - Anti-balaka
