= Mandja people =

Ethnic group

Mandja
Total population
- 370,000 (c.2003)

Regions with significant populations
- Central region of Central African Republic

Religion
- Christianity and Islam

Related ethnic groups
- Gbaya

The Mandja (also: Mandjia, Mandija, Manja) are an ethnic group found in the central region of the Central African Republic. They are related to the Gbaya people. In 2003, they numbered about 370,000 people.

Mandjia population in 2003

== Notable people ==
- Anne-Marie Ngouyombo, Central African politician and former mayor of Bangui (1995)
- Fidèle Gouandjika, Central African businessman and politician
