= Central African Republic =

Country in Central Africa

Central African Republic Ködörösêse tî Bêafrîka (Sango) République centrafricaine (French)
- Flag Coat of arms
- Motto: "Zo Kwe Zo" (Sango); "All people are people"; "Unité, Dignité, Travail" (French); "Unity, Dignity, Work"
- Anthem: E Zingo (Sango); La Renaissance (French); "The Renaissance"
- Capital and largest city: Bangui; 4°22′N 18°35′E
- Official languages: Sango; French
- Recognised national languages: Sango
- Ethnic groups: Baka; Banda; Bayaka; Fula; Gula; Gbaya; Kara; Kresh; Mbaka; Mandja; Ngbandi; Runga; Sara; Vidiri; Wodaabe; Yakoma; Yulu; Kanuri; Zande; other
- Religion (2020): 73.2% Christianity; 13.9% Islam; 12.0% traditional faiths; 0.9% other / none
- Demonym: Central African
- Government: Unitary presidential republic
  - President: Faustin-Archange Touadéra
  - Prime Minister: Félix Moloua
  - President of the National Assembly: Simplice Sarandji
- Legislature: National Assembly

Independence
  - Republic established: 1 December 1958
  - from France: 15 August 1960
  - Central African Empire established: 4 December 1976
  - Coronation of Bokassa I: 4 December 1977
  - Bokassa I's overthrow and republic restored: 21 September 1979

Area
  - Total: 622,984 km^{2} (240,535 sq mi) (44th)

Population
  - 2026 estimate: ▼5,513,282 (118th)
  - Density: 9/km^{2} (23.3/sq mi) (218th)
- GDP (PPP): 2026 estimate
  - Total: ▲$5.08 billion (170th)
  - Per capita: ▲$1,390 (190th)
- GDP (nominal): 2026 estimate
  - Total: ▲$3.710 billion (191st)
  - Per capita: ▲$613 (191st)
- Gini (2021): ▼43 medium inequality
- HDI (2026): ▲0.414 low (191st)
- Currency: Central African CFA franc (XAF)
- Time zone: UTC+01:00 (WAT)
- Calling code: +236
- ISO 3166 code: CF
- Internet TLD: .cf

The Central African Republic (Note: Sango: Ködörösêse tî Bêafrîka, Sango pronunciation: [kōdōrōsésè tí bé.àfríkà]; French: République centrafricaine, IPA: [ʁepyblik sɑ̃tʁafʁikɛn]; abbreviated RCA or Centrafrique, [sɑ̃tʁafʁik]) (CAR) is a landlocked country in Central Africa. It is bordered by Chad to the north, Sudan to the northeast, South Sudan to the east, the Democratic Republic of the Congo to the south, the Republic of the Congo to the southwest, and Cameroon to the west. The CAR covers a land area of about 620,000 square kilometres (240,000 sq mi). As of 2024, it has a population of 5,357,744, consisting of about 80 ethnic groups. Having been a French colony under the name Ubangi-Shari, (Note: French: Oubangui-Chari) Sango is its national language and was also its co-official language alongside French. Its capital and largest city is Bangui, which sits on the country's southern border with the Democratic Republic of the Congo.

The CAR mainly consists of Sudano-Guinean savanna, but also includes a Sahelo-Sudanian zone in the north and an equatorial forest zone in the south. Two-thirds of the country is within the basin of the Ubangi River (a tributary of the Congo River), while the remaining third lies in the basin of the Chari River, which flows into Lake Chad.

The region has been inhabited since at least 8000 BCE. The borders were established by France, which began annexing portions to the French Congo in the late 19th century and in 1903 established the separate colony of Ubangi-Shari, part of French Equatorial Africa. After gaining independence from France in 1960, the CAR was ruled by a series of autocratic leaders, including Jean-Bédel Bokassa, who changed the country's name to the Central African Empire and ruled as a monarch from 1976 to 1979. The Central African Bush War began in 2004 and, despite a peace treaty in 2007 and another in 2011, civil war resumed in 2012. The civil war perpetuated the country's poor human rights record, characterized by widespread and increasing abuses by various participating armed groups.

Despite its vast natural resources, such as uranium reserves, crude oil, gold, diamonds, cobalt, lumber, and hydropower, as well as significant quantities of arable land, the CAR is among the world's ten poorest countries, with the world's lowest GDP per capita at purchasing power parity (PPP) as of 2017. As of 2023, according to the Human Development Index, the country had the third-lowest level of human development, ranking 191st out of 193 countries. It had the second-lowest inequality-adjusted Human Development Index, ranking 164th out of 165 countries. It has been ranked as the unhealthiest country and the worst country for young people. The CAR is a member of the United Nations, the African Union, the Economic Community of Central African States, the Organisation internationale de la Francophonie and the Non-Aligned Movement.

== Etymology ==
The name is derived from the country's geographical location in Central Africa and its republican form of government. From 1976 to 1979, the country was known as the Central African Empire.

During the colonial era, the country's name was Ubangi-Shari (French: Oubangui-Chari), a name derived from two major rivers, the Ubangi and the Chari. Barthélemy Boganda, the first prime minister, favored the name "Central African Republic" over Ubangi-Shari, reportedly because he envisioned a larger union of countries in Central Africa.

== History ==
=== Early history ===
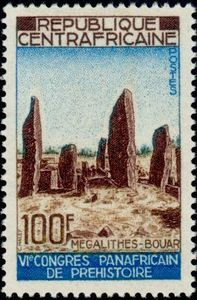
The Bouar Megaliths, pictured here on a 1967 Central African stamp, date back to the very late Neolithic Era (c. 3500–2700 BCE).

About 10,000 years ago, desertification forced hunter-gatherer societies south into the Sahel regions of northern Central Africa, where some groups settled. Farming began as part of the Neolithic Revolution. Initial farming of white yam progressed into millet and sorghum, and before 3000 BCE the domestication of African oil palm improved the groups' nutrition and allowed expansion of the local populations. This agricultural revolution, combined with a "Fish-stew Revolution", in which fishing began, and the use of boats, allowed the transportation of goods. Products were often moved in ceramic pots.

The Bouar Megaliths in the western region indicate an advanced level of habitation dating to the late Neolithic (c. 3500–2700 BCE). Ironwork developed in the region around 1000 BCE. The Ubangian people settled along the Ubangi River, while some Bantu people migrated from the southwest of Cameroon.

Bananas arrived in the region during the first millennium BCE and added an important source of carbohydrates to the diet; they were also used in the production of alcoholic beverages. Production of copper, salt, dried fish, and textiles dominated the economic trade in the Central African region.

=== 16th–19th centuries ===
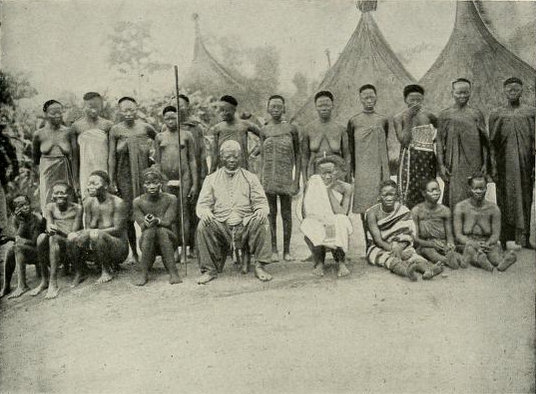
The Sultan of Bangassou and his wives, 1906

In the 16th and 17th centuries, slave traders began to raid the region as part of the expansion of the Saharan and Nile slave routes. Their captives were enslaved and shipped to a wide range of places: the Mediterranean coast, Europe, Arabia, the Western Hemisphere, the slave ports and factories along the coasts of West and North Africa, and south along the Ubangui and Congo rivers. During the 18th century Bandia-Nzakara Azande peoples established the Bangassou Kingdom along the Ubangi. In the mid 19th century, the Bobangi people became major slave traders and sold their captives to the Americas using the Ubangi to reach the coast. In 1875, the Sudanese sultan Rabih az-Zubayr governed Upper-Oubangui, which included present-day Central African Republic.

=== French colonial period ===
The European invasion of Central African territory began in the late 19th century during the Scramble for Africa. Europeans—primarily the French, Germans, and Belgians—arrived in the area in 1885. France seized and colonized Ubangi-Shari territory in 1894. In 1911 at the Treaty of Fez, France ceded a nearly 300,000 km^{2} (120,000 sq mi) portion of the Sangha and Lobaye basins to the German Empire which ceded a smaller area (in present-day Chad) to France. After World War I France again annexed the territory. Modeled on King Leopold's Congo Free State, concessions were doled out to private companies that endeavored to strip the region's assets as quickly and cheaply as possible before depositing a percentage of their profits into the French treasury. The concessionary companies forced local people to harvest rubber, coffee, and other commodities without pay and held their families hostage until they met their quotas.

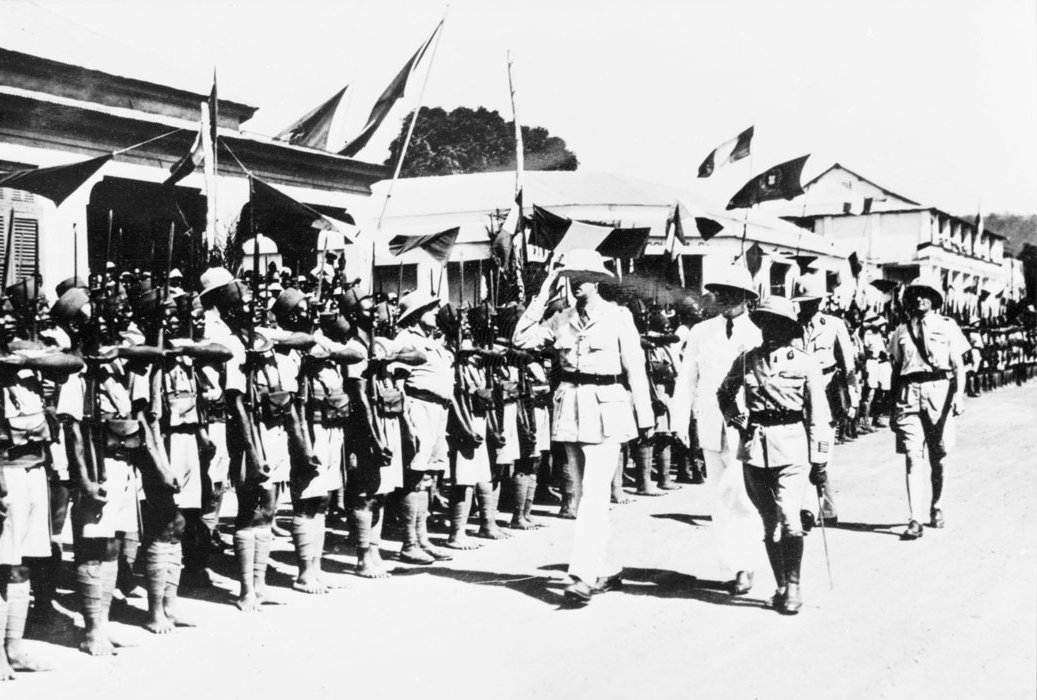
Charles de Gaulle in Bangui, 1940

In 1920, French Equatorial Africa was established, and Ubangi-Shari was administered from Brazzaville. During the 1920s and 1930s the French introduced a policy of mandatory cotton cultivation, a network of roads were built, attempts were made to combat sleeping sickness, and Protestant missions were established to spread Christianity. New forms of forced labour were introduced, and a large number of Ubangians were sent to work on the Congo–Ocean Railway. Through the period of construction until 1934 there was a continual heavy cost in human lives, with total deaths among all workers along the railway estimated in excess of 17,000 of the construction workers, from a combination of both industrial accidents and diseases including malaria. In 1928, a major insurrection, the Kongo-Wara rebellion or 'war of the hoe handle', broke out in western Ubangi-Shari and continued for several years. The extent of this insurrection, which was perhaps the largest anti-colonial rebellion in Africa during the interwar years, was carefully hidden from the French public because it provided evidence of strong opposition to French colonial rule and forced labour. French colonization in Oubangui-Chari is considered to be the most brutal of the French Empire.

In September 1940, during the Second World War, pro-Gaullist French officers took control of Ubangi-Shari, and General Leclerc established his headquarters for the Free French Forces in Bangui. In 1946 Barthélemy Boganda was elected with 9,000 votes to the French National Assembly, becoming the Central African Republic's first representative in the French government. Boganda maintained a political stance against racism and the colonial regime but gradually became disheartened with the French political system and returned to the CAR to establish the Movement for the Social Evolution of Black Africa (Mouvement pour l'évolution sociale de l'Afrique noire, MESAN) in 1950.

=== Since independence (1960–present) ===
In the 1957 Ubangi-Shari Territorial Assembly election, MESAN captured 347,000 of the 356,000 votes and won every legislative seat, which led to Boganda being elected president of the Grand Council of French Equatorial Africa and vice-president of the Ubangi-Shari Government Council. Within a year, he declared the establishment of the Central African Republic and served as the first prime minister. MESAN continued to exist, but its role was limited. The Central African Republic was granted autonomy 1 December 1958, a status which meant it was still counted as part of the French Empire.

After Boganda's death in a plane crash on 29 March 1959, his cousin David Dacko took control of MESAN. Dacko became the country's first president when the CAR formally received independence from France on 13 August 1960, a date celebrated by the country's Independence Day holiday. Dacko threw out his political rivals, including Abel Goumba, former prime minister and leader of Mouvement d'évolution démocratique de l'Afrique centrale, whom he forced into exile in France. With all opposition parties suppressed by November 1962, Dacko declared MESAN the official party of the state.

==== Bokassa and the Central African Empire (1965–1979) ====
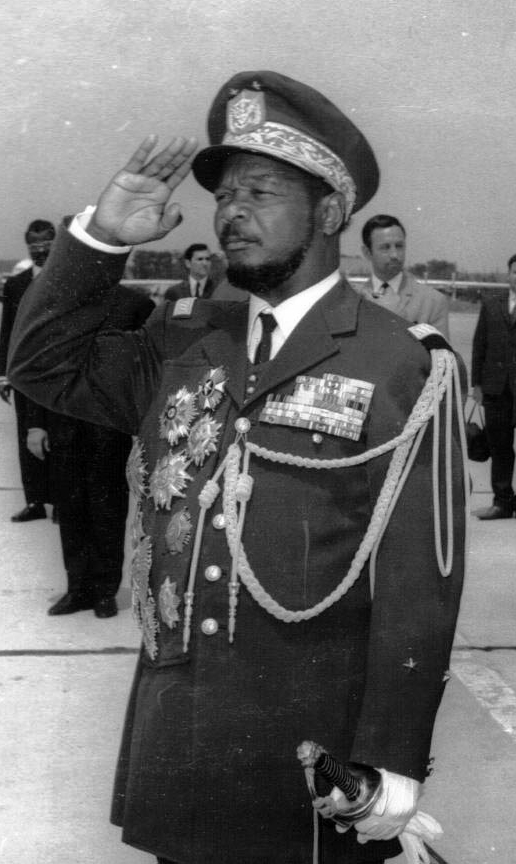
Jean-Bédel Bokassa, self-crowned Emperor of Central Africa

On 31 December 1965, Dacko was overthrown in the Saint-Sylvestre coup d'état by Colonel Jean-Bédel Bokassa, who suspended the constitution and dissolved the National Assembly. Bokassa declared himself President for Life in 1972 and named himself Emperor Bokassa I of the Central African Empire on 4 December 1976. A year later, he crowned himself in an expensive ceremony.

In April 1979, students protested against Bokassa's decree that all school pupils buy uniforms from a company owned by one of his wives. The government violently suppressed the protests, killing 100 children and teenagers. Bokassa may have been personally involved in some of the killings. In September 1979, France overthrew Bokassa and restored Dacko to power (subsequently restoring the official name of the country and the original government to the Central African Republic). Dacko was overthrown in a 1981 coup by General André Kolingba.

==== Central African Republic under Kolingba ====
Kolingba suspended the constitution and ruled with a military junta until 1985. He introduced a new constitution in 1986, which was adopted by a nationwide referendum. Membership in his new party, the Rassemblement Démocratique Centrafricain, was voluntary. In 1987 and 1988, semi-free elections to parliament were held, but Kolingba's two major political opponents, Abel Goumba and Ange-Félix Patassé, were not allowed to participate.

By 1990, inspired by the fall of the Berlin Wall, a pro-democracy movement arose. Pressure from the United States, France, and from a group of locally represented countries and agencies called GIBAFOR (France, the US, Germany, Japan, the EU, the World Bank, and the United Nations) finally led Kolingba to agree, in principle, to hold free elections in 1992 with help from the UN Office of Electoral Affairs. After using the excuse of alleged irregularities to suspend the results of the elections as a pretext for holding on to power, Kolingba came under intense pressure from GIBAFOR to establish a "Conseil National Politique Provisoire de la République" (Provisional National Political Council) and to set up a "Mixed Electoral Commission", which included representatives from all political parties.

When a second round of elections was held in 1993, again with the help of the international community coordinated by GIBAFOR, Patassé won with 53% of the vote to Goumba's 45.6%. Patassé's party, the Mouvement pour la Libération du Peuple Centrafricain (Movement for the Liberation of the Central African People), gained a plurality but not an absolute majority of seats in parliament, which meant Patassé's party required coalition partners.

==== Patassé government (1993–2003) ====
Patassé purged many of the Kolingba elements from the government, and Kolingba supporters accused Patassé's government of conducting a "witch hunt" against the Yakoma. A new constitution was approved but had little impact on the country's politics. In 1996–1997, reflecting steadily decreasing public confidence in the government's erratic behavior, three mutinies against Patassé's administration were accompanied by widespread destruction of property and heightened ethnic tension. In 1996 the Peace Corps evacuated all its volunteers to neighboring Cameroon. To date, the Peace Corps has not returned to the Central African Republic. The 1997 Bangui Agreements provided for the deployment of an inter-African military mission to the Central African Republic and re-entry of ex-mutineers into the government. The inter-African military mission was later replaced by a UN peacekeeping force (MINURCA). Since 1997, the country has hosted almost a dozen peacekeeping interventions, earning it the title of "world champion of peacekeeping". In the 1998 parliamentary elections, Kolingba's party won 20 out of 109 seats. But the next year, despite widespread anger in urban centers over his corrupt rule, Patassé won a second term in the presidential election.

In 2001 rebels stormed strategic buildings in Bangui in an unsuccessful coup attempt. The army chief of staff, Abel Abrou, and General François N'Djadder Bedaya were killed, but Patassé regained the upper hand by bringing in at least 300 troops of the Congolese rebel leader Jean-Pierre Bemba and Libyan soldiers. In the aftermath of the failed coup, militias loyal to Patassé sought revenge against rebels in many Bangui neighborhoods and incited unrest including the murder of many political opponents. Eventually, Patassé came to suspect that General François Bozizé was involved in another coup attempt against him, which led Bozizé to flee with loyal troops to Chad. In March 2003, Bozizé launched a surprise attack against Patassé, who was out of the country. Libyan troops and some 1,000 soldiers of Bemba's Congolese rebel organization failed to stop the rebels and Bozizé's forces overthrew Patassé.

==== Civil wars ====
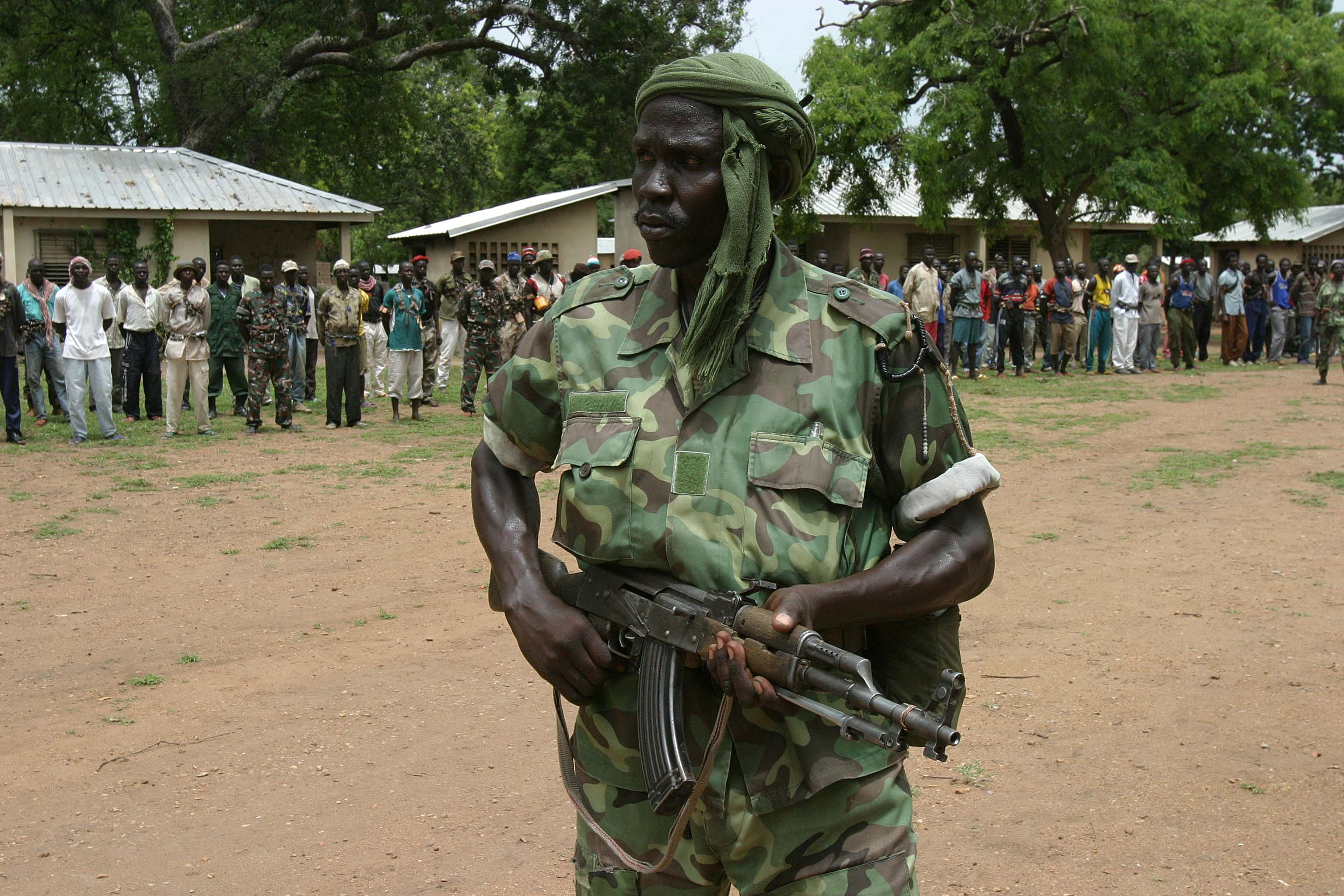
Rebel militia in the northern countryside, 2007

Bozizé suspended the constitution and named a new cabinet, which included most opposition parties. Abel Goumba was named vice-president. Bozizé established a broad-based National Transition Council to draft a new constitution and announced that he would step down and run for office once the constitution was approved.

In 2004, the Central African Bush War began as forces opposed to Bozizé took up arms against his government. In May 2005, Bozizé won the presidential election, which excluded Patassé, and in 2006 fighting continued between the government and the rebels. In November 2006, Bozizé's government requested French military support to help them repel rebels who had taken control of towns in the country's northern regions. Though the initial public details of the agreement pertained to logistics and intelligence, by December the French assistance included airstrikes by Dassault Mirage 2000 fighters against rebel positions.

The Syrte Agreement in February and the Birao Peace Agreement in April 2007 called for a cessation of hostilities, the billeting of FDPC fighters and their integration with FACA, the liberation of political prisoners, the integration of FDPC into government, an amnesty for the UFDR, its recognition as a political party, and the integration of its fighters into the national army. Several groups continued to fight but other groups signed on to the agreement or similar agreements with the government. The only major group not to sign an agreement at the time was the CPJP, which continued its activities and signed a peace agreement with the government in 2012.

In 2011, Bozizé was reelected in an election widely considered fraudulent. In November 2012, Séléka, a coalition of rebel groups, took over towns in the CAR's northern and central regions. These groups reached a peace deal with Bozizé's government in January 2013, involving a power-sharing government. The deal later broke down, the rebels seized the capital in March 2013, and Bozizé fled the country.

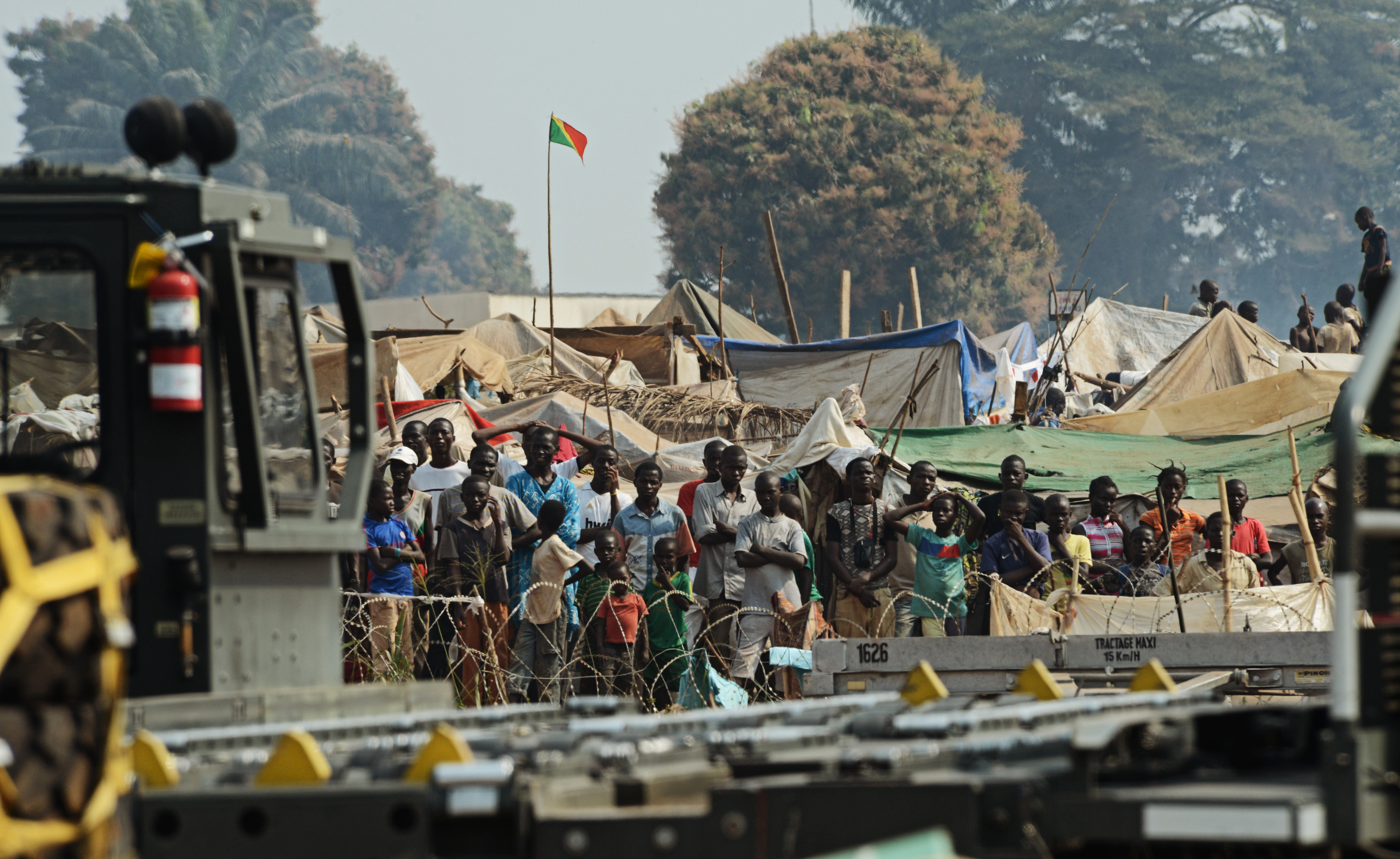
Refugees of the fighting in the Central African Republic, January 2014

Michel Djotodia took over as president. Prime Minister Nicolas Tiangaye requested a UN peace, and on 31 May Bozizé was indicted for crimes against humanity and incitement to genocide. By the end of the year, there were international warnings of a "genocide" and fighting was largely reprisal attacks on civilians by Seleka's predominantly Muslim fighters and Christian militias called "anti-balaka". By August 2013, there were reports of over 200,000 internally displaced persons.

In February 2014, Secretary-General Ban Ki-moon called on the UN Security Council to deploy 3,000 troops to the CAR, bolstering the 6,000 African Union soldiers and 2,000 French troops already there, to combat civilians being murdered in large numbers. The Séléka government was said to be divided, and in September 2013, Djotodia officially disbanded Séléka, but many rebels refused to disarm, becoming known as ex-Séléka, and veered further out of government control. It is argued that the focus of the initial disarmament efforts exclusively on the Séléka inadvertently handed the anti-Balaka the upper hand, leading to the forced displacement of Muslim civilians by anti-Balaka in Bangui and western CAR.

In January 2014, Michael Djotodia and Nicolas Tiengaye resigned as part of a deal negotiated at a regional summit in Chad. Catherine Samba-Panza was elected interim president by the National Transitional Council, becoming the first female Central African president. In July 2014, following Congolese mediation efforts, Séléka and anti-balaka representatives signed a ceasefire agreement in Brazzaville. By the end of 2014, the CAR was de facto partitioned, with the anti-Balaka in the southwest and ex-Séléka in the northeast. In March 2015, Samantha Power, the U.S. ambassador to the United Nations, said 417 of the country's 436 mosques had been destroyed, and Muslim women were so scared to go out in public they were giving birth in their homes instead of going to the hospital. On 14 December 2015, Séléka rebel leaders declared an independent Republic of Logone.

==== Touadéra government (2016–present) ====
Current military situation in Central African Republic

Presidential elections were held in December 2015. As no candidate received more than 50% of the vote, a second round of elections was held on 14 February 2016 with runoffs on 31 March. In the second round, former Prime Minister Faustin-Archange Touadéra was declared the winner with 63% of the vote, defeating Union for Central African Renewal candidate Anicet-Georges Dologuélé, another former prime minister. While the elections suffered from many potential voters being absent as they had taken refuge in other countries, the fears of widespread violence were ultimately unfounded, and the African Union regarded the elections as successful. Touadéra was sworn in on 30 March 2016. No representatives of Séléka or the "anti-balaka" militias were included in the subsequently formed government.

Presidential elections were held on 27 December 2020. Bozizé announced his candidacy but was rejected by the Constitutional Court, which held that he did not satisfy the "good morality" requirement for candidates because of an international warrant and United Nations sanctions against him for alleged assassinations, torture, and other crimes. As large parts of the country were at the time controlled by armed groups, the election could not be conducted in many areas of the country. Some 800 of the polling stations, 14% of the total, were closed due to violence. Three Burundian peacekeepers were killed and two were wounded during the run-up to the election. Touadéra was reelected.

Russian mercenaries from the Wagner Group have supported Touadéra in the fight against rebels. Wagner Group has been accused of harassing and intimidating civilians. In December 2022, Roger Cohen wrote in The New York Times that "Wagner shock troops form a Praetorian Guard for Mr. Touadéra, who is also protected by Rwandan forces, in return for an untaxed license to exploit and export the Central African Republic's resources" and "one Western ambassador called the Central African Republic...a 'vassal state' of the Kremlin."

Although the constitution initially limited presidency to two terms, Touadéra abolished constitutional term limits through a controversial referendum in 2023. He was reelected to a third term in December 2025. As of 2026, Russian military personnel are reportedly still heavily integrated into Touadéra's government, both from state-run Africa Corps and from the independent remnants of the Wagner Group.

== Geography ==
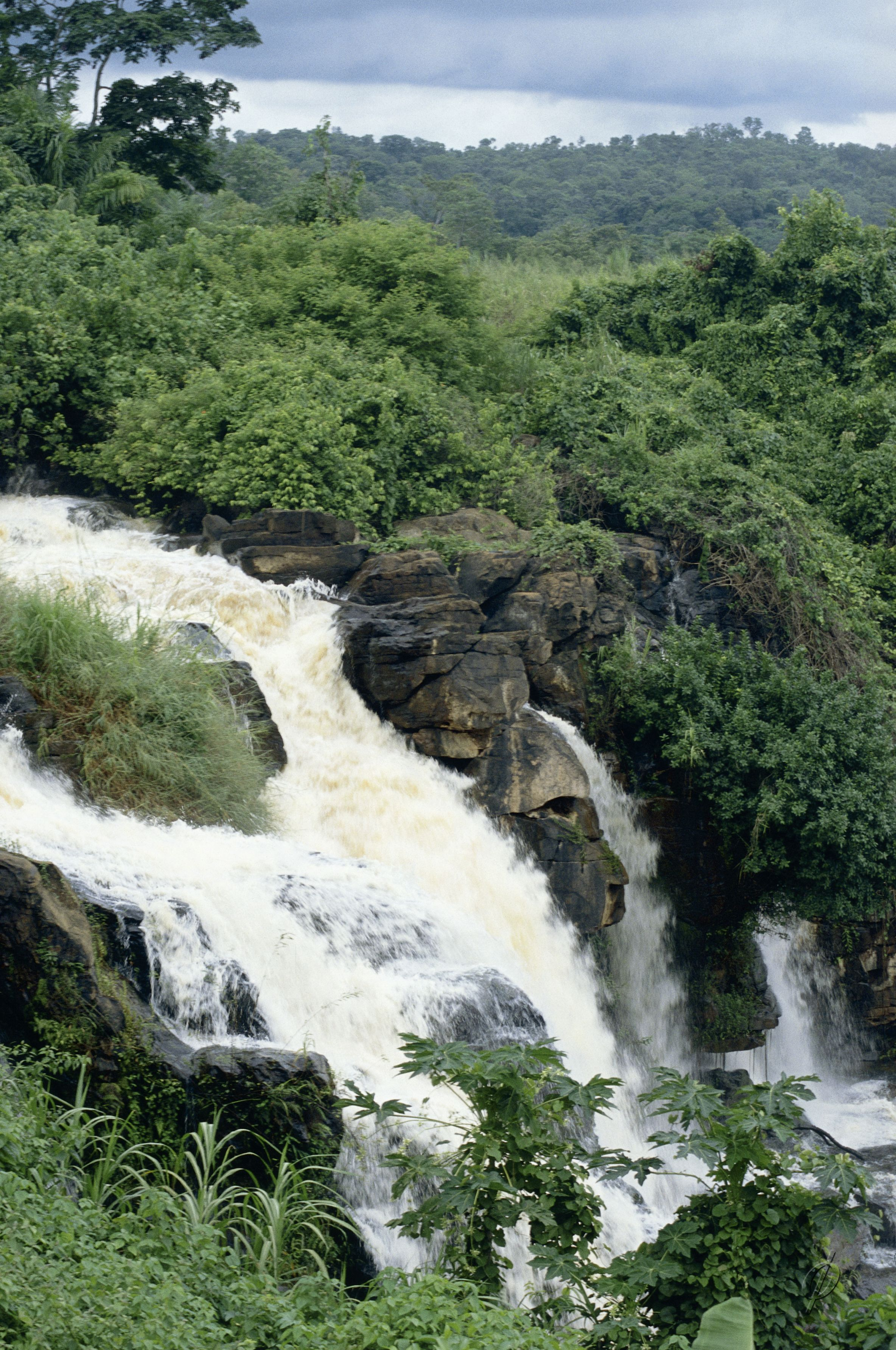
Falls of Boali on the Mbali River

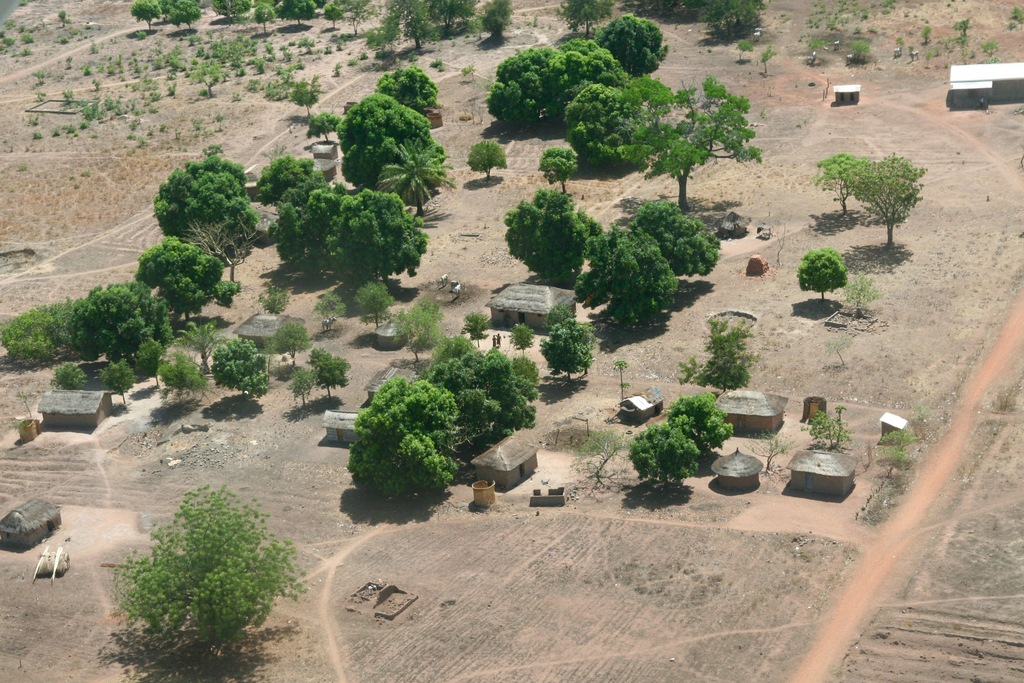
A village in the Central African Republic

The Central African Republic is a landlocked nation in the interior of the African continent. It is bordered by Cameroon, Chad, Sudan, South Sudan, the Democratic Republic of the Congo, and the Republic of the Congo. It lies between latitudes 2° and 11°N, and longitudes 14° and 28°E.

At 622,984 square kilometres (240,535 sq mi), the CAR is the world's 44th-largest country. Much of the country consists of a flat or rolling plateau savanna approximately 500 metres (1,640 ft) above sea level. In addition to the Fertit Hills in the northeast, there are scattered hills in the southwest. In the northwest is the Yade Massif, a granite plateau with an altitude of 348 metres (1,143 ft). The Central African Republic contains six terrestrial ecoregions: Northeastern Congolian lowland forests, Northwestern Congolian lowland forests, Western Congolian swamp forests, East Sudanian savanna, Northern Congolian forest-savanna mosaic, and Sahelian Acacia savanna.

Much of the southern border is formed by tributaries of the Congo River; the Mbomou River in the east merges with the Uele River to form the Ubangi River, which also comprises portions of the southern border. The Sangha River flows through some of the western regions of the country, while the eastern border lies along the edge of the Nile watershed.

Around 36% of the country is covered by forest, with the densest forest in the south. The forests are highly diverse and include commercially important species of Ayous, Sapelli, and Sipo. The deforestation rate is about 0.4% per annum, and lumber poaching is commonplace. The Central African Republic had a 2018 Forest Landscape Integrity Index mean score of 9.28/10, ranking it seventh globally out of 172 countries.

In 2008, Central African Republic was the world's least light pollution affected country.

The focal point of the Bangui magnetic anomaly, one of the largest magnetic anomalies on Earth, is located in the capital.

=== Climate ===
Köppen climate classification map of the Central African Republic

The climate is generally tropical, with a wet season that lasts from June to September in the north, and from May to October in the south. During the wet season, rainstorms are an almost daily occurrence, and early morning fog is commonplace. Maximum annual precipitation is approximately 1,800 millimetres (71 in) in the upper Ubangi region.

The northern areas are hot and humid from February to May, but can be subject to the hot, dry, and dusty trade wind known as the Harmattan. The southern regions have a more equatorial climate, but they are subject to desertification, while the extreme northeast regions are steppe.

=== Biodiversity ===
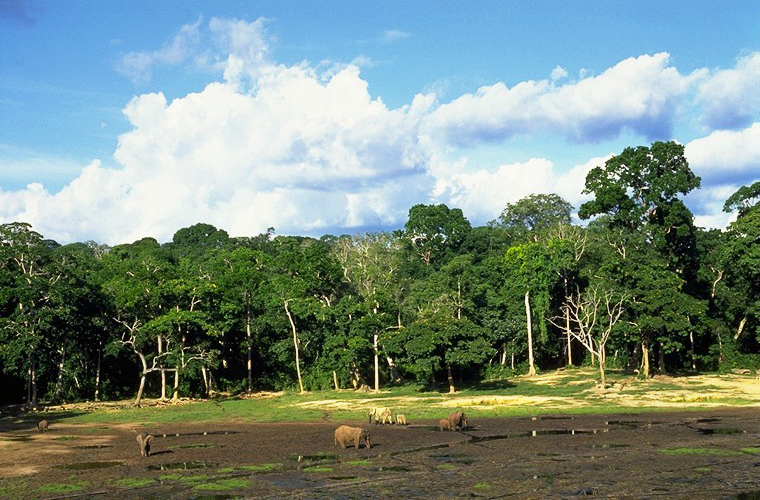
Dzanga-Sangha Reserve

In the southwest, the Dzanga-Sangha National Park is located in a rainforest area. The country is noted for its population of forest elephants and western lowland gorillas. In the north, the Manovo-Gounda St. Floris National Park and Bamingui-Bangoran National Park contain leopards, lions, cheetahs and rhinos. The parks have been seriously affected by the activities of poachers, particularly those from Sudan, over the past two decades.

Forest cover is around 36% of the land area, equivalent to 22,303,000 hectares (ha) of forest in 2020, down from 23,203,000 hectares (ha) in 1990. In 2020, naturally regenerating forest covered 22,301,000 hectares (ha) and planted forest covered 2,000 hectares (ha). Of the naturally regenerating forest, 9% was reported to be primary forest (consisting of native tree species with no clearly visible indications of human activity). In 2015, 91% of the forest area was reported to be under public ownership and 9% private ownership. In 2021, the rate of deforestation increased by 71%.

== Government and politics ==
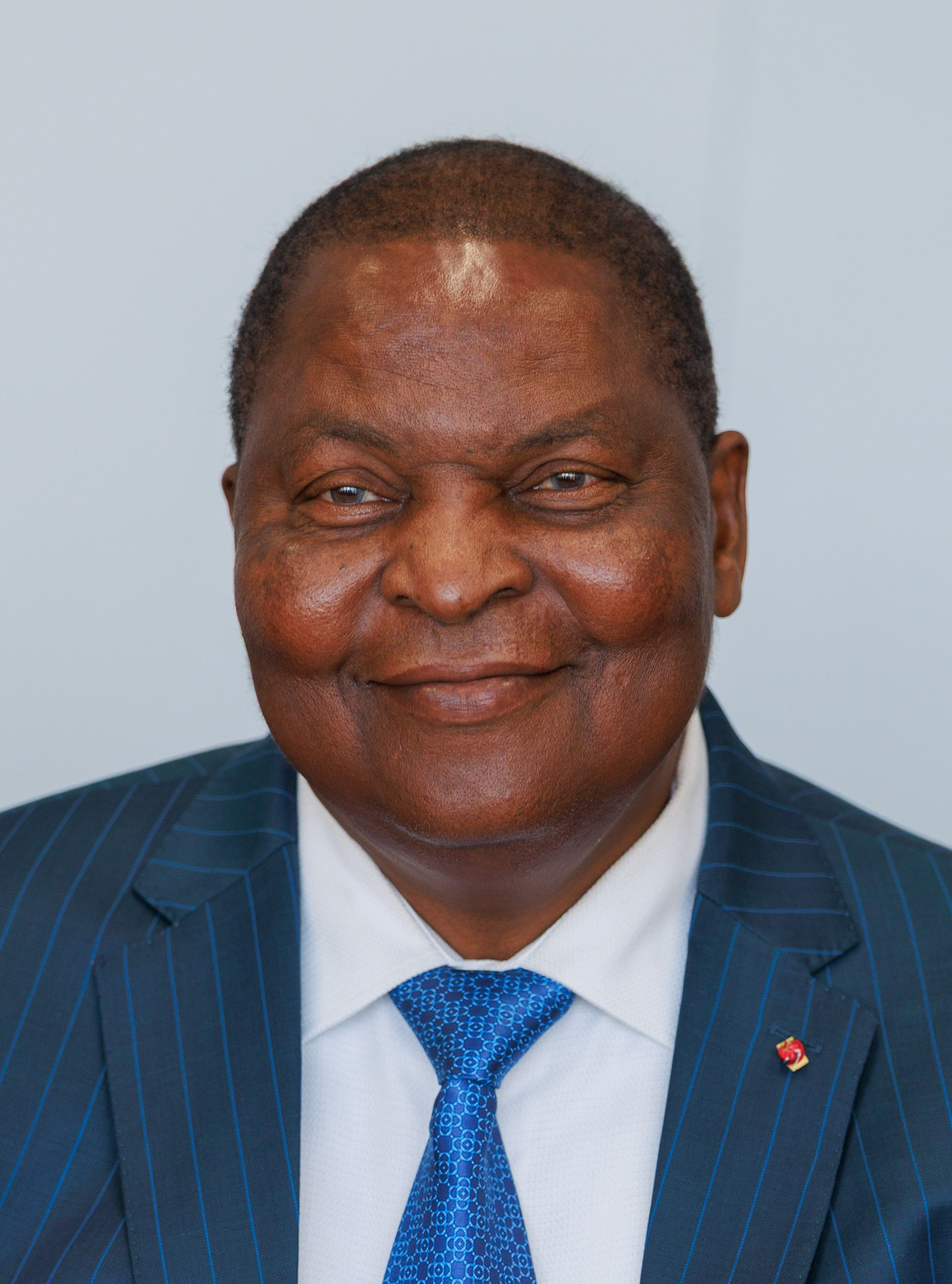
Faustin-Archange Touadéra
President

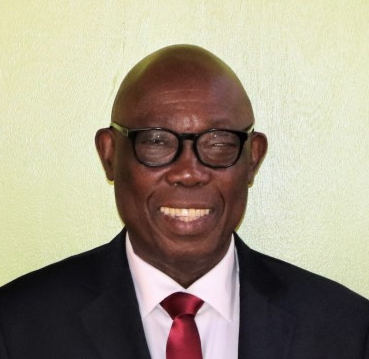
Félix Moloua
Prime Minister

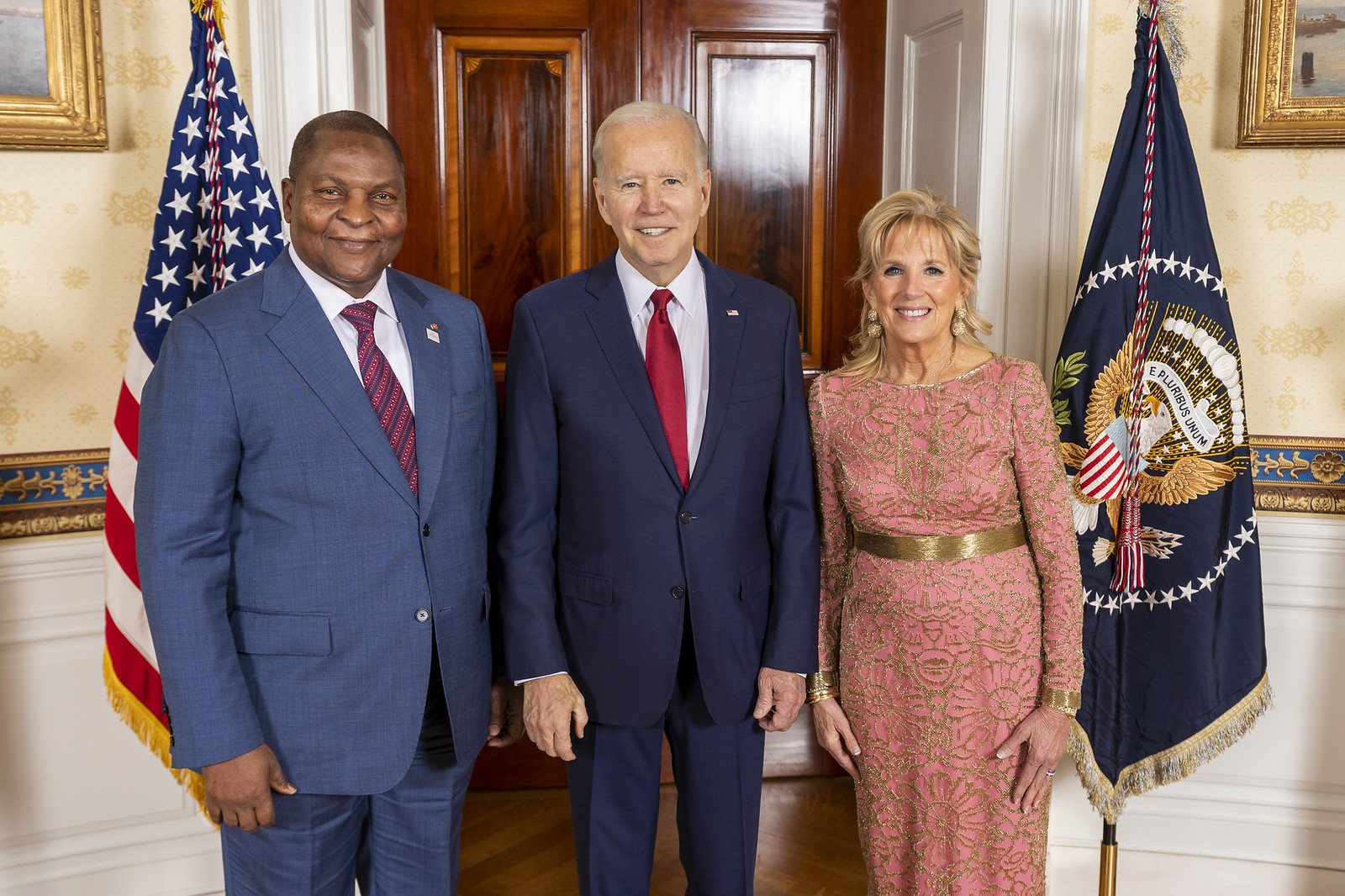
Central African Republic President Faustin-Archange Touadéra with US President Joe Biden, and Jill Biden, 14 December 2022

Politics of the Central African Republic formally take place in a framework of a presidential republic. In this system, the president is the head of state, with a prime minister as head of government. Executive power is exercised by the government. Legislative power is vested in both the government and parliament.

Changes in government have occurred in recent years by three methods: violence, negotiations, and elections. A new constitution was approved by voters in a referendum held on 5 December 2004. The government was rated 'Partly Free' from 1991 to 2001 and from 2004 to 2013. V-Dem Democracy Indices described Central African Republic as autocratizing in 2024.

The president is elected by popular vote for a six-year term, and the prime minister is appointed by the president. The president also appoints and presides over the Council of Ministers, which initiates laws and oversees government operations. However, as of 2018, the official government is not in control of large parts of the country, which are governed by rebel groups. Acting president since April 2016 is Faustin-Archange Touadéra who followed the interim government under Catherine Samba-Panza and interim Prime Minister André Nzapayeké.

The National Assembly (Assemblée Nationale) has 140 members, elected for a five-year term using the two-round (or run-off) system. As in many other former French colonies, the Central African Republic's legal system is based on French law. The Supreme Court, or Cour Suprême, is made up of judges appointed by the president. There is also a Constitutional Court, and its judges are also appointed by the president. Freedom of speech is addressed in the constitution, but there have been incidents of government intimidation of the media. A report by the International Research & Exchanges Board's media sustainability index noted that "the country minimally met objectives, with segments of the legal system and government opposed to a free media system".

=== Administrative divisions ===
Prefectures of the Central African Republic

The Central African Republic is divided into 7 administrative regions, the regions are further divided into 20 administrative prefectures (préfectures) and 85 sub-prefectures (sous-préfectures).

=== Foreign relations ===
President Faustin-Archange Touadéra with Russian President Vladimir Putin at the Russia–Africa Summit, 28 October 2026

The Central African Republic is heavily dependent on foreign aid, and numerous NGOs provide services that the government does not provide. In 2019, over US$100 million in foreign aid was spent in the country, mostly on humanitarian assistance.

In 2006, due to ongoing violence, over 50,000 people in the country's northwest were at risk of starvation, but this was averted due to assistance from the United Nations. On 8 January 2008, the UN Secretary-General Ban Ki-Moon declared that the Central African Republic was eligible to receive assistance from the Peacebuilding Fund. Three priority areas were identified: first, the reform of the security sector; second, the promotion of good governance and the rule of law; and third, the revitalization of communities affected by conflicts. On 12 June 2008, the Central African Republic requested assistance from the UN Peacebuilding Commission, which was set up in 2005 to help countries emerging from conflict avoid devolving back into war or chaos.

In response to concerns of a potential genocide, a peacekeeping force—the International Support Mission to the Central African Republic (MISCA)—was authorized in December 2013. This African Union force of 6,000 personnel was accompanied by the French Operation Sangaris.

In 2017, the Central African Republic signed the UN Treaty on the Prohibition of Nuclear Weapons.

In August 2025, Russia demanded that the Central African Republic pay its Africa Corps for armed protection rather than use the private mercenaries Wagner Group.

=== Human rights ===
The 2009 Human Rights Report by the United States Department of State notes that human rights in the Central African Republic were poor and expressed concerns over numerous government abuses. The U.S. State Department alleged that major human rights abuses such as extrajudicial executions by security forces, torture, beatings, and rape of suspects and prisoners occurred with impunity. It also alleged harsh and life-threatening conditions in prison and detention centers, arbitrary arrest, prolonged pretrial detention and denial of a fair trial, restrictions on freedom of movement, official corruption, and restrictions on workers' rights.

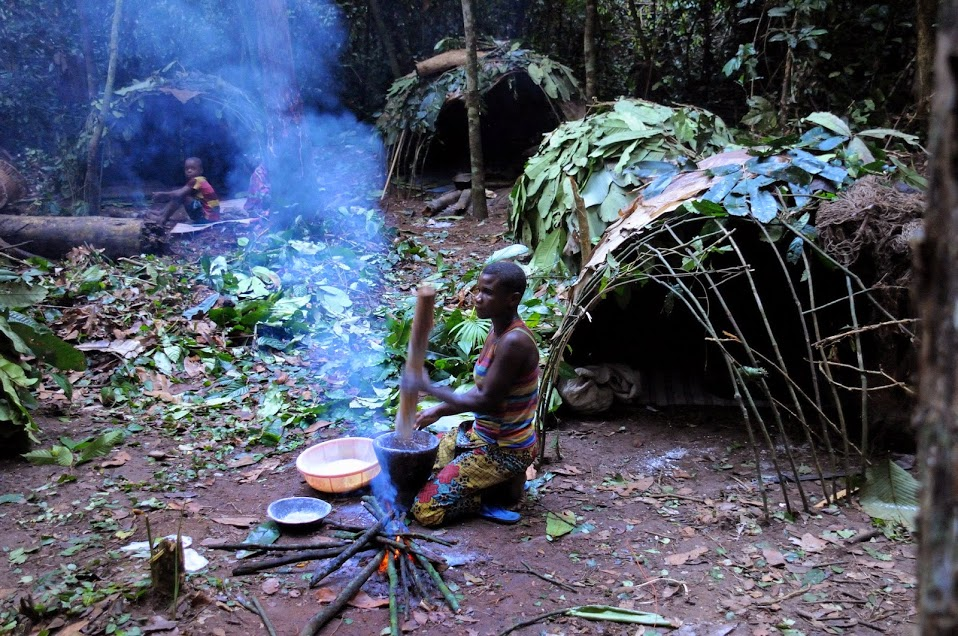
Aka hunter-gatherers living in the Dzanga-Sangha Special Reserve

The State Department report also cites widespread mob violence, the prevalence of female genital mutilation, discrimination against women and pygmies, human trafficking, forced labor, and child labor. Freedom of movement is limited in the northern part of the country "because of actions by state security forces, armed bandits, and other non-state armed entities", and due to fighting between government and anti-government forces, many people have been internally displaced. Violence against children and women in relation to accusations of witchcraft has also been cited as a serious problem in the country. Witchcraft is a criminal offense under the penal code.

Approximately 68% of girls are married before they turn 18, and the United Nations's Human Development Index ranked the country 188th out of 188 countries surveyed. The Bureau of International Labor Affairs has also mentioned it in its last edition of the List of Goods Produced by Child Labor or Forced Labor.

== Economy ==
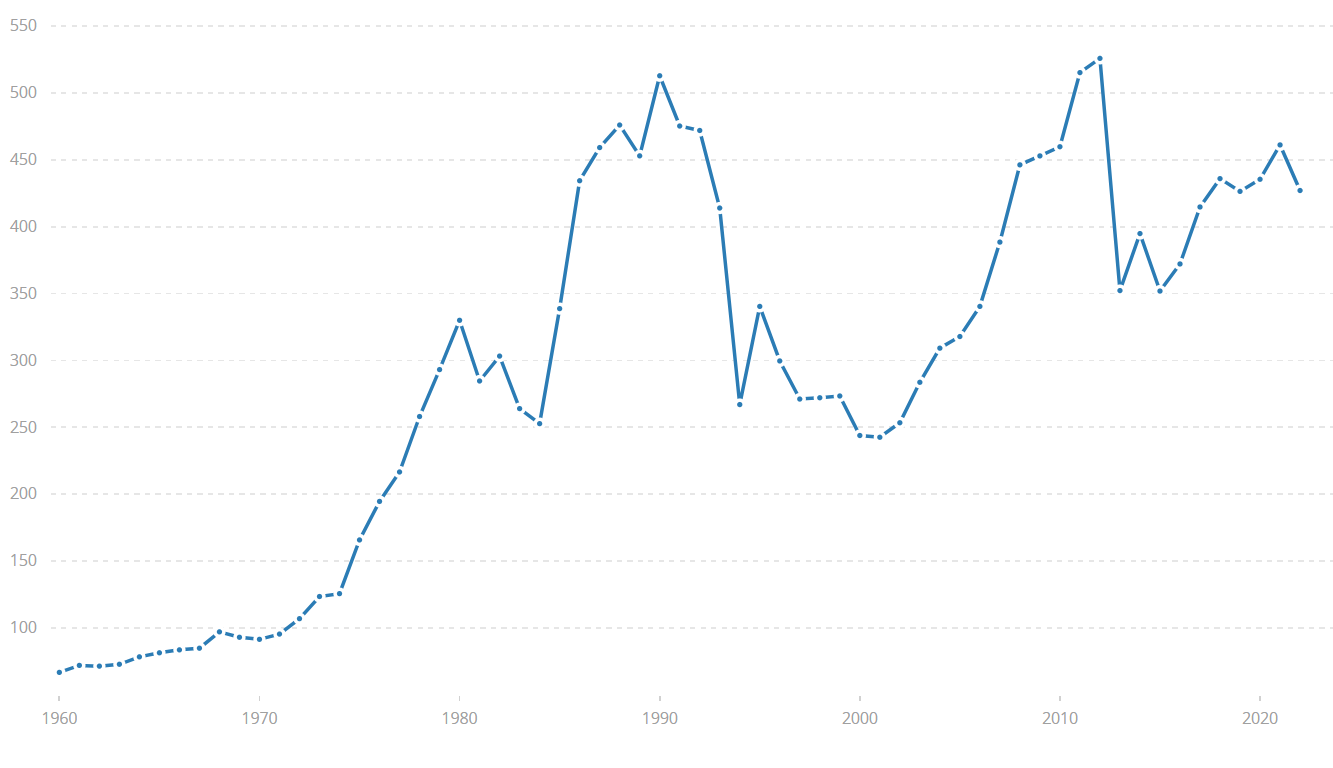
GDP per capita (2022 USD)

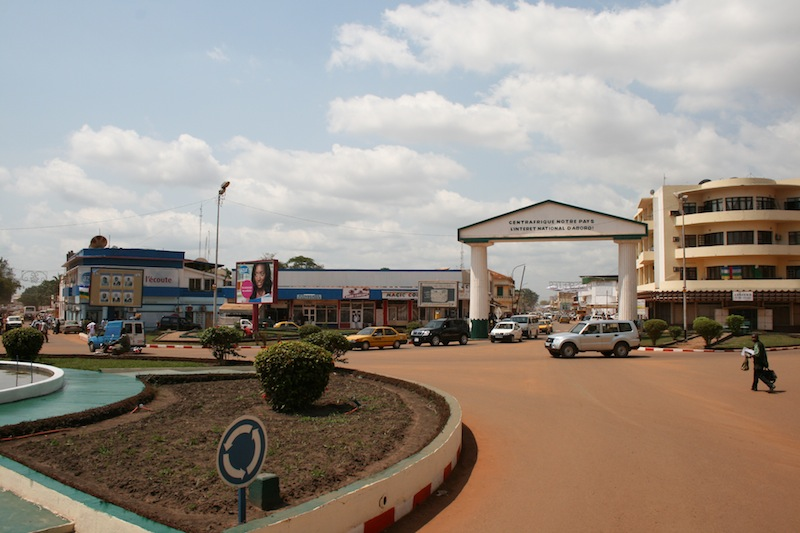
Bangui shopping district

The per capita income of the Republic is often listed as being approximately $400 per year, one of the lowest in the world, but this figure is based mostly on reported sales of exports and largely ignores the unregistered sale of foods, locally produced alcoholic beverages, diamonds, ivory, bushmeat, and traditional medicine. The annual growth rate of real GDP is slightly above 3%. The primary import partner is France (17.1%). Other imports come from the United States (12.3%), India (11.5%), and China (8.2%). Its largest export partner is France (31.2%), followed by Burundi (16.2%), China (12.5%), Cameroon (9.6%), and Austria (7.8%). The currency is the CFA franc, which is accepted across the former countries of French West Africa and trades at a fixed rate to the euro.

Diamonds constitute the most important export, accounting for 40–55% of export revenues, but it is estimated that between 30% and 50% of those produced each year leave the country clandestinely. Agriculture is dominated by the cultivation and sale of food crops such as cassava, peanuts, maize, sorghum, millet, sesame, and plantain. The importance of food crops over exported cash crops is indicated by the fact that the total production of cassava, the staple food of most Central Africans, ranges between 200,000 and 300,000 tonnes per year, while the production of cotton, the principal exported cash crop, ranges from 25,000 to 45,000 tonnes per year. Food crops are not exported in large quantities, but still constitute the principal cash crops of the country because Central Africans derive far more income from the periodic sale of surplus food crops than from exported cash crops such as cotton or coffee. Much of the country is self-sufficient in food crops; however, livestock development is hindered by the presence of the tsetse fly.

The Central African Republic is a member of the Organization for the Harmonization of Business Law in Africa (OHADA). In the 2009 World Bank Group's report Doing Business, it was ranked 183rd out of 183 as regards 'ease of doing business', a composite index which takes into account regulations that enhance business activity and those that restrict it.

== Infrastructure ==
=== Transportation ===
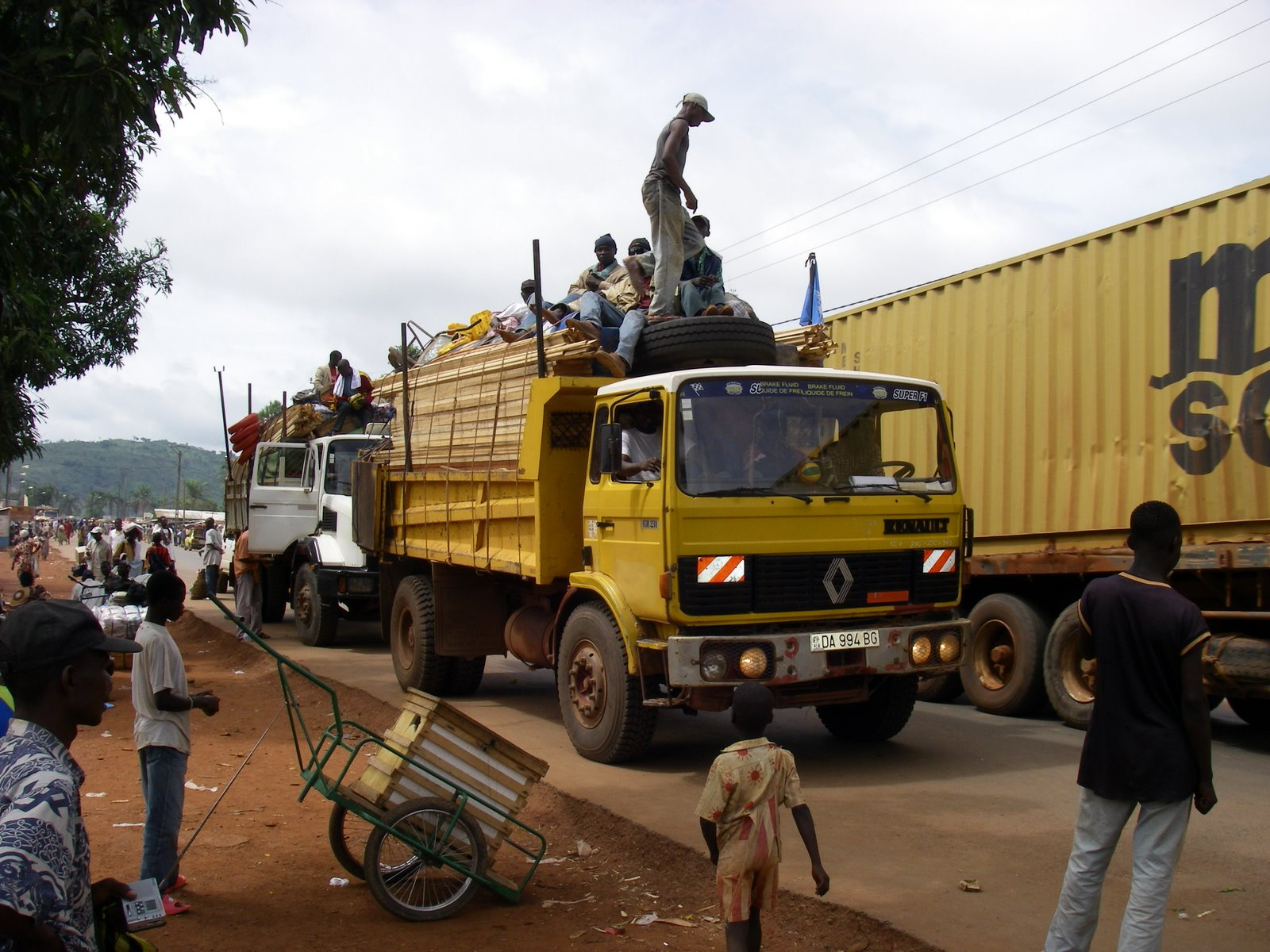
Trucks in Bangui

Two trans-African automobile routes pass through the Central African Republic: the Tripoli-Cape Town Highway and the Lagos-Mombasa Highway. Bangui is the transport hub. As of 1999, eight roads connected the city to other main towns in the country, Cameroon, Chad, and South Sudan; of these, only the toll roads are paved. During the rainy season from July to October, some roads are impassable.

River ferries sail from the river port at Bangui to Brazzaville and Zongo. The river can be navigated most of the year between Bangui and Brazzaville. From Brazzaville, goods are transported by rail to Pointe-Noire, Congo's Atlantic port. The river port handles the overwhelming majority of the country's international trade and has a cargo handling capacity of 350,000 tons; it has 350 metres (1,150 ft) length of wharfs and 24,000 square metres (260,000 sq ft) of warehousing space.

Bangui M'Poko International Airport is the only international airport. Since at least 2002, there have been plans to connect Bangui by rail to the Transcameroon Railway.

=== Energy ===
The Central African Republic primarily uses hydroelectricity as there are few other low-cost resources for generating electricity. Access to electricity is very limited with 15.6% of the population having electrification, 34.6% in urban areas and 1.5% in rural areas.

=== Communications ===
The CAR has active television services, radio stations, internet service providers, and mobile phone carriers; Socatel is the country's leading provider of internet and mobile phone access. The primary governmental regulating bodies of telecommunications are the Ministère des Postes and Télécommunications et des Nouvelles Technologies. In addition, the CAR receives international support on telecommunication-related operations from ITU Telecommunication Development Sector (ITU-D) of the International Telecommunication Union to improve infrastructure.

== Demographics ==
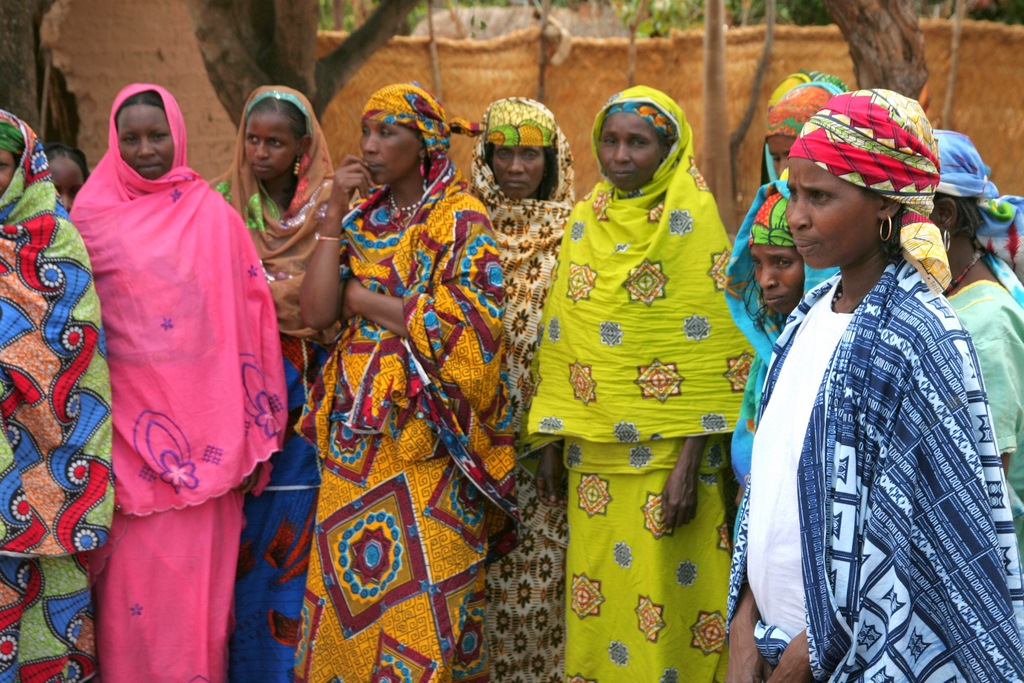
Fula women in Paoua

The population has almost quadrupled since independence. In 1960, the population was 1,232,000; as of a 2021 UN estimate, it is approximately 5,457,154. The nation comprises over 80 ethnic groups, each having its own language. The largest ethnic groups are the Baggara Arabs, Baka, Banda, Bayaka, Fula, Gbaya, Kara, Kresh, Mbaka, Mandja, Ngbandi, Sara, Vidiri, Wodaabe, Yakoma, Yulu, and Zande, with others including Europeans of mostly French descent. The most common ethnic groups are Gbaya (Baya) (28.8%) and Banda (22.9%), comprising together slightly over half of the country's population in 2003.

Largest cities or towns in Central African Republic According to the 2003 Census
Rank	Name	Prefecture	Pop.	Rank	Name	Prefecture	Pop.
1	Bangui	Bangui	622,771	11	Kaga-Bandoro	Nana-Grébizi	24,661
2	Bimbo	Bangui	124,176	12	Sibut	Kémo	22,419
3	Berbérati	Mambéré-Kadéï	76,918	13	Mbaïki	Lobaye	22,166
4	Carnot	Mambéré-Kadéï	45,421	14	Bozoum	Ouham-Pendé	20,665
5	Bambari	Ouaka	41,356	15	Paoua	Ouham-Pendé	17,370
6	Bouar	Nana-Mambéré	40,353	16	Batangafo	Ouham	16,420
7	Bossangoa	Ouham	36,478	17	Kabo	Ouham	16,279
8	Bria	Haute-Kotto	35,204	18	Bocaranga	Ouham-Pendé	15,744
9	Bangassou	Mbomou	31,553	19	Ippy	Ouaka	15,196
10	Nola	Sangha-Mbaéré	29,181	20	Alindao	Basse-Kotto	14,401

=== Languages ===
Official languages are French and Sango, a creole developed as an inter-ethnic lingua franca based on the local Ngbandi language.

=== Religion ===
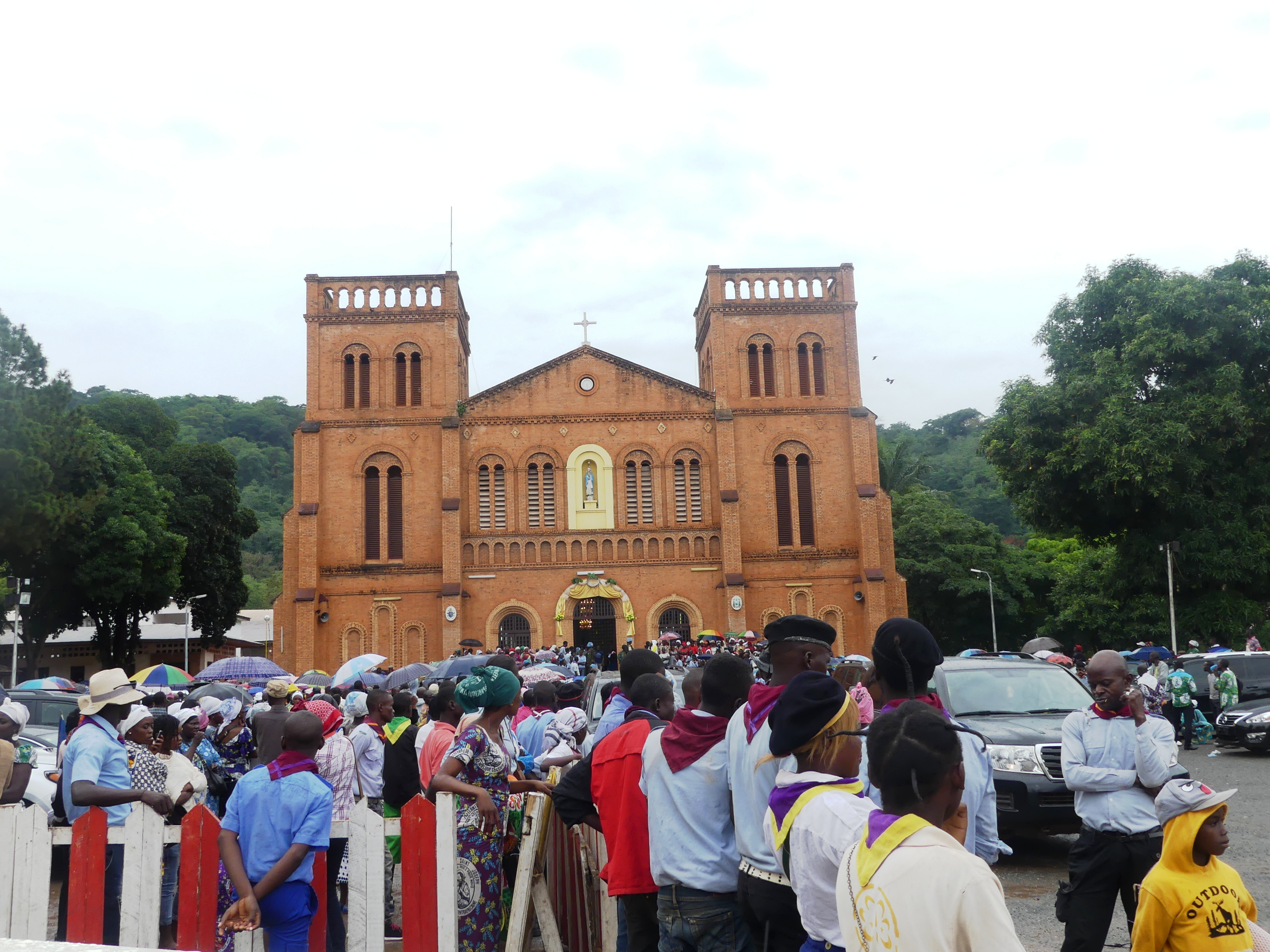
Worshippers at the Bangui Cathedral. Christianity is the main religion in the Central African Republic.

According to the 2003 national census, 80.3% of the population was Christian (51.4% Protestant and 28.9% Roman Catholic), 10% was Muslim, and 4.5 percent was other religious groups, with 5.5 percent having no religious beliefs. In 2010 the Pew Research Center estimated that Christians constituted 89.8% of the population (60.7% Protestant and 28.5% Catholic) while Muslims made up 8.9%. The Catholic Church claims over 1.5 million adherents, approximately one-third of the population. Indigenous belief (animism) is also practiced, and many indigenous beliefs are incorporated into Christian and Islamic practice. A UN director described religious tensions between Muslims and Christians as being high.

Many missionary groups are operating in the country, including Lutherans, Baptists, Catholics, Grace Brethren, and Jehovah's Witnesses. While these missionaries are predominantly from the United States, France, Italy, and Spain, many are also from Nigeria, the Democratic Republic of the Congo, and other African countries. Large numbers of missionaries left the country when fighting broke out between rebel and government forces in 2002, but many of them have returned to continue their work. According to Overseas Development Institute research, during the crisis ongoing since 2012, religious leaders have mediated between communities and armed groups; they also provided refuge for people seeking shelter.

=== Education ===
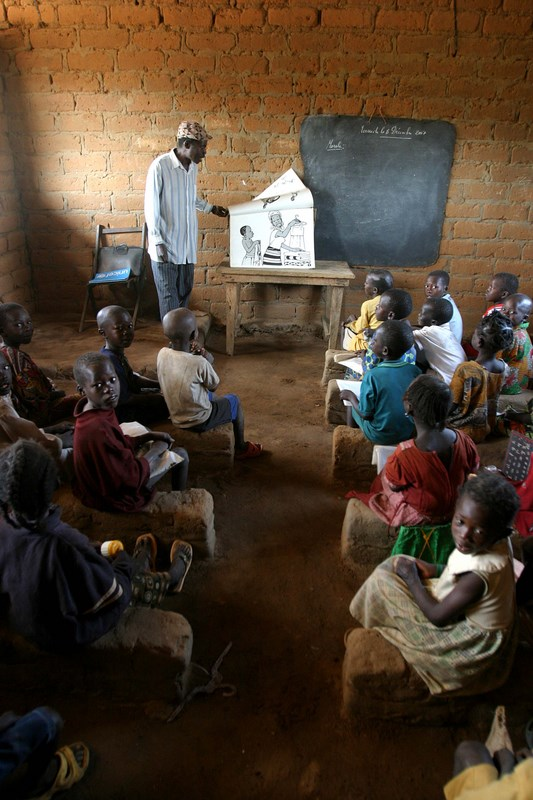
Classroom in Sam Ouandja

Public education is free and compulsory from ages 6 to 14, but approximately half of the adult population is illiterate. The two institutions of higher education are the University of Bangui, a public university in Bangui that includes a medical school; and Euclid University, an international university. Only 66% of CAR kids attend school.

=== Health ===
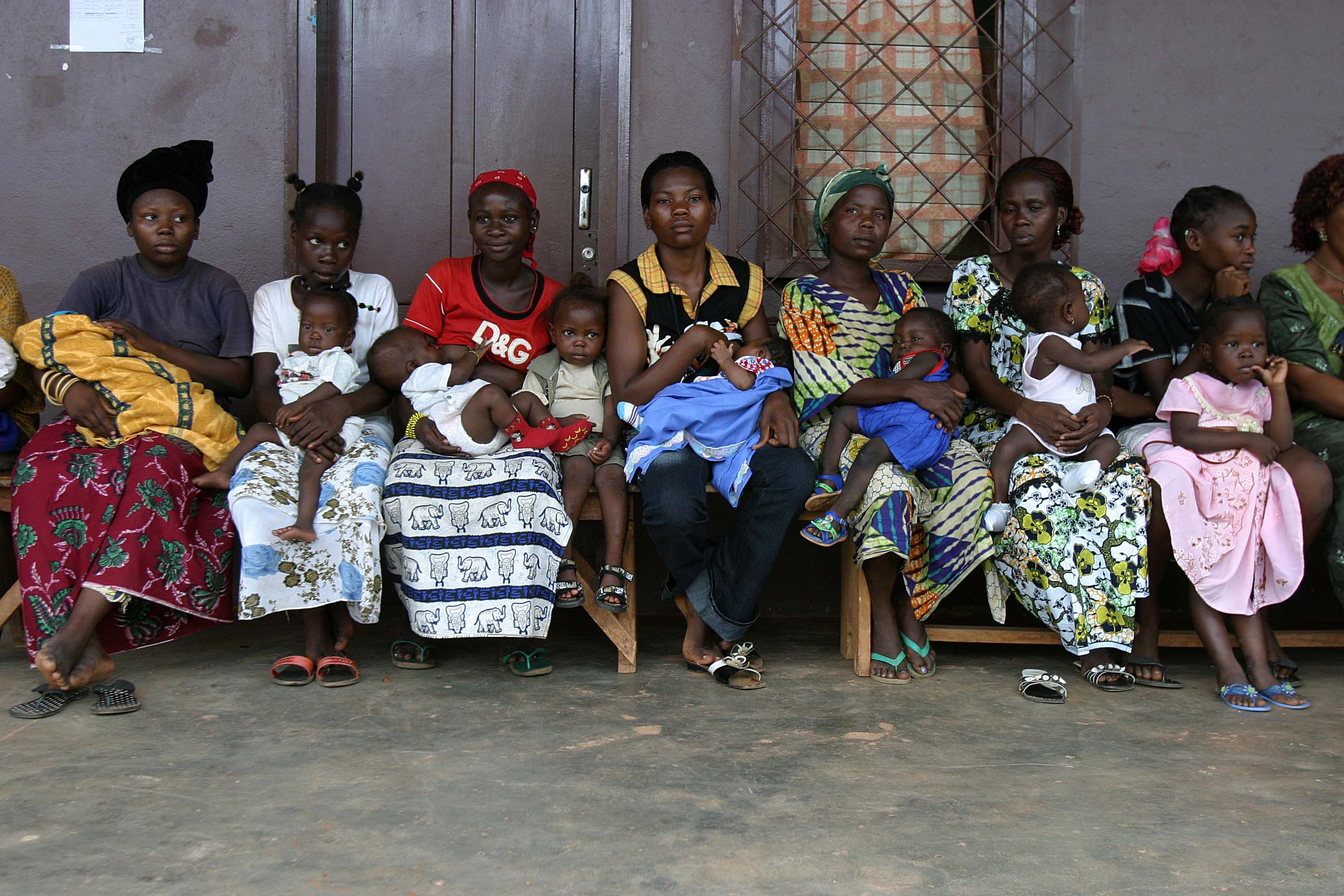
Mothers with babies aged between 0 and 5 years are lining up in a Health Post at Begoua, a district of Bangui, waiting for the two drops of the oral polio vaccine.

The largest hospitals are in the Bangui district. As a member of the World Health Organization, the Central African Republic receives vaccination assistance, such as a 2014 intervention for the prevention of a measles epidemic. In 2007, female life expectancy at birth was 48.2 years, and male life expectancy at birth was 45.1 years. As of 2010, the country had the fourth highest maternal mortality rate in the world. The total fertility rate in 2014 was estimated at 4.46 children born/woman. Approximately 25% of women had undergone female genital mutilation. Many births in the country are guided by traditional birth attendants, who often have little or no formal training.

Malaria is endemic and one of the leading causes of death. According to 2009 estimates, the HIV/AIDS prevalence rate is about 4.7% of the adult population (ages 15–49); 3% has antiretroviral therapy available, compared to 17% coverage in the neighboring countries of Chad and the Republic of the Congo. Government expenditure on health was US$20 (PPP) per person in 2006 and 10.9% of total government expenditure in 2006. There was only around 1 physician for every 20,000 people in 2009.

With a score of 31.5 in the 2024 Global Hunger Index, the Central African Republic ranks 119th out of the 127 countries with sufficient data to calculate 2024 GHI scores.

== Culture ==
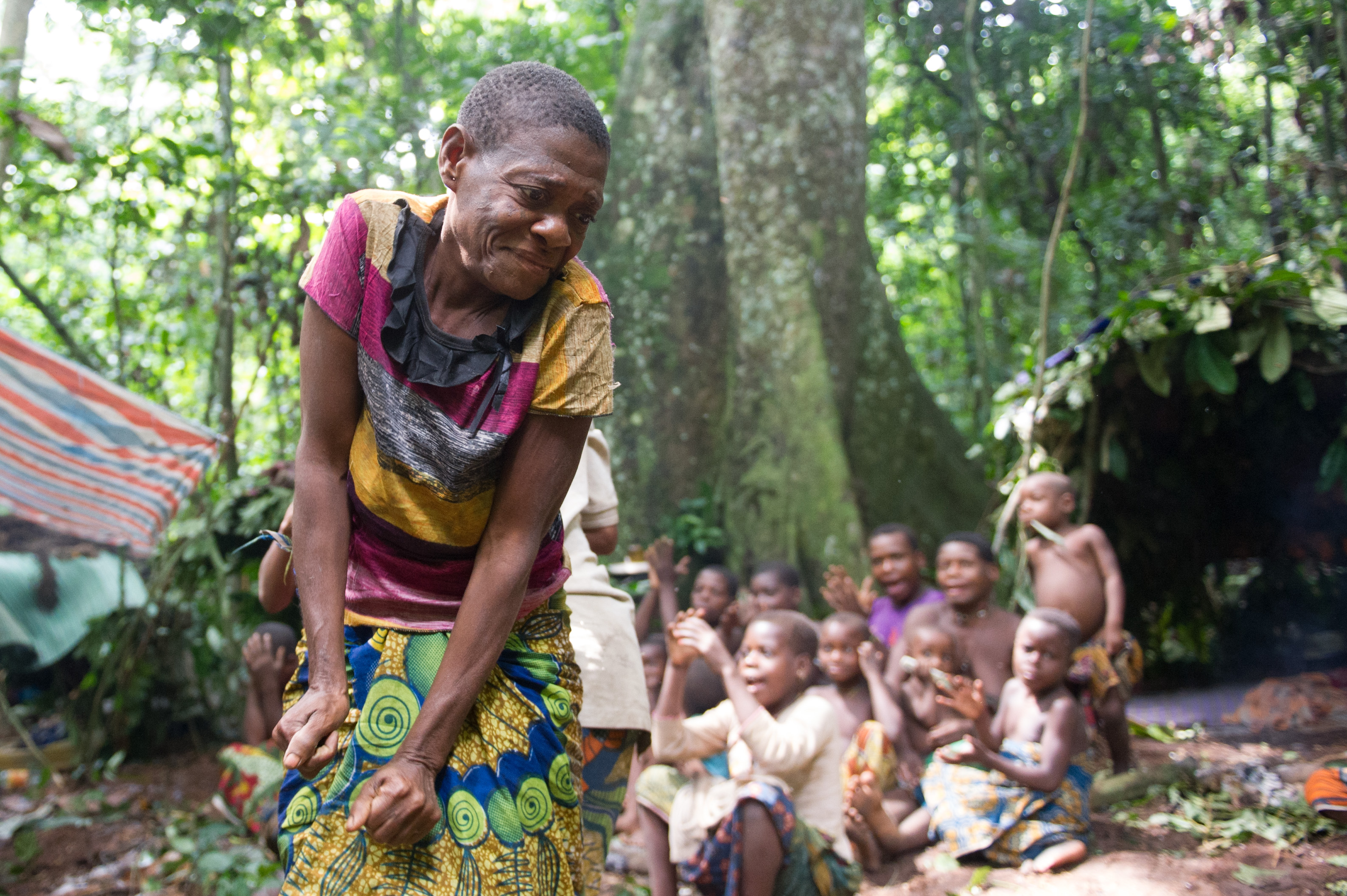
A Baka woman dancing

=== Music ===
According to UNESCO, “The Aka Pygmies living in the south-west region of the Central African Republic have developed a distinctive vocal musical tradition, which involves a complex type of contrapuntal polyphony based on four voices, mastered by all members of the Aka community.”

=== Sports ===
Football is the country's most popular sport. The national football team is governed by the Central African Football Federation and stages matches at the Barthélemy Boganda Stadium. Basketball is also popular and its national team won the African Championship twice and was the first Sub-Saharan African team to qualify for the Basketball World Cup, in 1974.

== See also ==
- Outline of the Central African Republic
- List of Central African Republic–related topics
