= Bruno Dacko =

Central African politician (1952–2023)

Minister of Tourism
- In office 31 March 2003 – 19 June 2005
- President: François Bozizé
- Prime Minister: Abel Goumba; Célestin Gaombalet
- Preceded by: Constance Nathalie Gounebana
- Succeeded by: Anne-Marie Ngouyombo

Personal details
- Born: 2 November 1952
- Died: 11 July 2023 (aged 70) Corbeil-Essonnes, France
- Parent(s): David Dacko (father); Florence Yagbao (mother)

Bruno Dacko (2 November 1952 – 11 July 2023) was a Central African politician who served as the Minister of Tourism of the Central African Republic from 2003 to 2005. He is the son of the first President of the Central African Republic, David Dacko.

Dacko was born on 2 November 1952, the son of David Dacko, a member of the Mbaka people, and his first wife, Florence Yagbao, a member of the Gbanziri people. David Dacko became the first President of the Central African Republic in 1960 and Yagbao became the country's inaugural first lady. Bruno Dacko attended the Lycee Barthélemy Boganda in Bangui before moving to France to study linguistics. He returned to the Central African Republic and later joined his father's political party, the Movement for Democracy and Development (MDD) in the 1990s.

President François Bozizé appointed Bruno Dacko as Minister of Tourism under Prime Minister Abel Goumba on 31 March 2003. He served under Goumba until the end of his tenure in December 2003. Dacko was the re-appointed Minister of Tourism by Goumba's successor, Prime Minister Célestin Gaombalet from 15 December 2003 until 19 June 2005.

Dacko died in Corbeil-Essonnes on 11 July 2023.
