= Cécile Bozanga =

Central African politician

Deputy Minister of the Budget
- In office 4 April 1981 – ?
- President: David Dacko
- Prime Minister: Simon Narcisse Bozanga

Personal details
- Born: 12 February 1951 (age 75) Bangui, Ubangi-Shari, French Equatorial Africa
- Spouse: Simon Narcisse Bozanga
- Education: University of Bangui
- Occupation: Banker; Politician

Cécile Bozanga is a Central African politician and banker who served as Deputy Minister of the Budget under David Dacko's administration. She is the spouse of Simon Narcisse Bozanga.

== Biography ==
Born in Bangui on 12 February 1951, she studied science at the University of Bangui and economic at the University of Clermont-Ferrand. Upon graduating from University of Clermont Ferrand, she worked at the Ministry of Finance and later became a tax inspector. Dacko appointed her as Deputy Minister of the budget on 4 April 1981. During Kolingba's administration, she worked again as a tax inspector and then served as director of the Central African National Depository Bank (BNCD). In 1996, she was appointed as the president of the board of the Joint Reinsurance Company of the Member States of the Inter-African Conference on Insurance Markets.

On 6 May 2003, Bozize appointed her as deputy director general of the property and tax services of the Ministry of Finance. She served as a member of Ecobank's director board from 2008 to 2010 in Bangui. Furthermore, she also became a member of the interministerial committee for the development of the strategy representing Minister of Finance and Budget in 2008.

Djotodia named her as a member of the General Inspectorate of Finance and Heads of Services on 12 June 2013. Six months later, Djotodia assigned her as a member of the National Election Authority (ANE) for a seven-year term on 17 December. On 9 August 2021, she became the member of Roman Catholic Archdiocese of Bangui's Economic Affairs.

== Work ==
- Boubande, M. Paul; Boue, M. Raphaël; Bozanga, Cécile (2008) Coûts et financement du système in World Bank, World Bank Le systeme educatif Centrafricain : contraintes et marges de manoeuvre pour la reconstruction du systeme educatif dans la perspective de la reduction de la pauvrete. Washington D.C.
