= Henri Maïdou =

Prime Minister of the Central African Republic

1st Vice President of the Central African Republic
- In office 26 September 1979 – 22 August 1980
- President: David Dacko
- Preceded by: Office created
- Succeeded by: Abel Goumba (2003)

Prime Minister of the Central African Empire
- In office 14 July 1978 – 26 September 1979
- Monarch: Bokassa I
- Preceded by: Ange-Félix Patassé
- Succeeded by: Bernard Ayandho
Other political offices
Minister of National Education
In office
4 April 1976 – 14 July 1978
In office
25 June 1970 – 16 October 1973
- Minister of Urbanism
- and Territorial Administration
In office
15 June 1974 – 4 April 1976
- Minister of Public Health
- and Social Affairs
In office
16 October 1973 – 15 June 1974

Personal details
- Born: 14 February 1936 (age 90) Bangui, Ubangi-Shari
- Relations: Christophe Maïdou (brother)
- Parent: Maurice Maïdou (father)
- Occupation: Professor of Geography

Henri Maïdou (born 14 February 1936) is a Central African retired politician who served as Prime Minister of the Central African Empire (Central African Republic) from 14 July 1978 to 26 September 1979, and Vice President of the Central African Republic in the cabinet of David Dacko from 26 September 1979 to 22 August 1980.

== Biography ==
=== Early life ===
Maïdou was born on 14 February 1936 in Bangui. His father, Maurice Maïdou, was an official and his twin brother, Christophe Maïdou, who served as the Central African Ambassador to the Democratic Republic of Congo, Yugoslavia, Japan, Taiwan, France, and the United States. Henri Maïdou came from an academic background and worked as a geography professor.

=== Political career ===
His entry into politics came on 25 June 1970, when President Jean-Bédel Bokassa named him Minister of Education. He became Minister of Youth, Sports, and Arts (along with Education) on 26 April 1971. Maïdou was appointed Minister of Public Health and Social Affairs on 16 October 1973. On 15 June 1974, he became Minister of Urbanism and Territorial Administration. His second stint as Minister of Education, Youth, Sports, Arts, and Culture began on 4 April 1976. Maïdou became Second Vice Prime Minister of the Central African Revolution Council on 4 September, with his portfolio consisting of national education and education reform. The council was disbanded on 14 December. Soon afterward, Bokassa transformed the country into the Central African Empire, with himself as Emperor Bokassa I.

Bokassa was unsatisfied with the results of the 1977 baccalaureate and sought to reform the school system. Maïdou's solution was to remove French teachers, an option Bokassa rejected. At the bidding of Bokassa, Maïdou announced on 2 February 1978 that all schoolchildren must wear a specific type of uniform by 1 October. Jewelry and hats were forbidden, and students faced suspension from school if they refused to comply. The uniforms were costly, and were manufactured by a company owned by Bokassa's family, the Compagnie industrielle ouanguienne des textiles. This sparked student protests, and their suppression resulted in the "Bangui children's massacre". Around 100 children perished in the massacre.

Prime Minister Ange-Félix Patassé suffered a heart attack in March 1978 and went to France to recuperate. In his absence, Bokassa dissolved his government and appointed Maïdou prime minister on 14 July 1978. Maïdou broke with Bokassa in May 1979, after having to read a statement that denied that the children's massacre ever happened. He feared the wrath of the citizens if Bokassa's regime fell. He was likely involved in the plot that overthrew Bokassa on 20 September 1979.

On 26 September, President David Dacko appointed him vice president. While vice president, Maïdou gave an interview with Jeune Afrique, stating that he and Dacko were not faithful members of the regime but followed along out of terror. "Some terror," Bokassa responded from exile, "with loads of CFA francs, beautiful cars, beautiful villas, beautiful women, and beautiful business. Look at him [Maïdou] in the photograph, with the face of a bon vivant and playboy." Maïdou was removed from this position on 22 August 1980 and subsequently placed under house arrest, as many opposition groups opposed his appointment. Maïdou founded the Parti republicain pour le progres on 27 December and contested the March 1981 presidential election. He finished fourth with 3.2 percent of the vote and subsequently left politics.

=== Cabinet of the Empire of Central Africa ===
Henri Maïdou served as Prime Minister of the Central African Empire from 14 July 1978 to 20 September 1979, during the reign of Emperor Jean-Bédel Bokassa. His government succeeded the Patassé cabinet on July 14 1978 and his cabinet was formed in a period of growing political tension, economic decline, and increasing authoritarianism. Maïdou’s cabinet consisted mainly of technocrats and loyal officials appointed by Bokassa, but the Prime Minister had limited real authority, as Bokassa maintained strict control over all state decisions. The government faced major instability in 1979 following the schoolchildren protest crisis and subsequent repression, which caused international outrage and isolated the regime. By mid-1979, the government was weakened and functioning in a caretaker capacity. Maïdou’s administration ended abruptly on 20 September 1979, when France overthrew Bokassa in Operation Barracuda and restored David Dacko to power, dissolving the entire Maïdou government. It was replaced by a brief Caretaker Government, but that was dissolved 5 days later on 26 September 1979.

His government is composed of:

- Prime Minister: Henri Maïdou
- 1st Vice-Prime Minister, in charge of Coordination of Economic and Financial Questions: Alphonse Koyamba
- 2nd Vice-Prime Minister, in charge of the Interior and Coordination of Administrative and Social Questions: Joseph Potolot
- Minister of State, in charge of Public Works, Regional Planning, and Urbanism: General André-Dieudonné Magale
- Minister of State, in charge of Social Affairs, Organization, and Women's Promotion: Marie-Joseph Zan-Fe Touam-Bona
- Minister of State, in charge of Transport: Louis Alazoula
- Minister of Agriculture and Livestock: Emmanuel Abdoul
- Minister of Trade and Industry: Victor Boucher
- Minister of National Defense: Louis Lakouama
- Minister of Energy, Mines, and Geology: Rigobert Yombo
- Minister of Finance: François Epaye
- Minister of Foreign Affairs: Jean-Paul Mokodopo
- Minister of Higher Education and Scientific and Technical Research: David Zokoé
- Minister of Labor and Justice: Michel Robinet de Saint-Omer
- Minister of Primary, Secondary, and Technical Education: Jean-Claude Kazagui
- Minister of Organization and Orientation of Broadcasting and Television: Barthélémy Yangongo
- Minister of Planning, International Cooperation, and Statistics: Jean-Pierre Lebouder
- Minister of Posts and Telecommunications: Justin Salamate
- Minister of Public Health: Doctor Georges Pinerd
- Minister of Civil Service and Social Security: Michel Gbézéra-Bria
- Minister of Relations with the Imperial Court: Eugène Ngouagouni
- Minister of Small and Medium-Sized Enterprises: Jacob Gbéti
- Minister of the General Secretariat of the Government: Simon Narcisse Bozanga
- Minister of Water, Forests, Hunting, Fishing, and Tourism: Théodore Bagoyombo
- Secretary of State to the Ministry of Finance: Pierre Alphonse Bazoli-Yakete
- Secretary of State to the Ministry of Foreign Affairs: Henri Koba
- Secretary of State to the Ministry of the Interior: Alphonse Mossaba
- Secretary of State to the Ministry of National Defense: Ambroise Assombele
- Secretary of State to the Prime Minister, in charge of Youth, Sports, Culture, and Tourism: Olivier Ogboulougbougnade
- Secretary of State to the Ministry of Social Affairs: Angeline Songomali

=== Caretaker Government (September 1979) ===
The Henri Maïdou caretaker government governed the newly refunded Central African Republic from 21 September to 26 September 1979, during the overthrow of Emperor Bokassa I and the collapse of the Central African Empire. Henri Maïdou, who had been prime minister under Bokassa, remained briefly in office after the French-backed Operation Barracuda restored former president David Dacko to power. The caretaker government’s purpose was to maintain state administration and public order while republican institutions were re-established. It consisted mainly of existing ministers and senior officials from the late imperial administration. After five days, the transitional cabinet was replaced on 26 September 1979 when Bernard Ayandho became prime minister and Maïdou became vice president under Dacko on the 27 September 1979. The government is historically important as the short-lived bridge between Bokassa’s empire and the restored Central African Republic.

Members:

- Henri Maïdou — Prime Minister — 14 July 1978 to 20 September 1979
- François Gueret — Minister of State for Justice — September 1979 to 20 September 1979
- Albert Bébembélé — Minister of Finance — September 1979 to 20 September 1979
- André Zama — Minister of Defense — September 1979 to 20 September 1979
- Élie Doté — Minister of National Education — September 1979 to 20 September 1979
- Charles Bodinga — Minister of Health — September 1979 to 20 September 1979
- Nicolas Mandaba — Minister of Agriculture — September 1979 to 20 September 1979
- Jean-Pierre Lebanga — Minister of Public Works — September 1979 to 20 September 1979
- Michel Adama Tamboux — Minister of Foreign Affairs — September 1979 to 20 September 1979
- Siméon Ngango — Minister of Interior — September 1979 to 20 September 1979
- Prosper Danionga — Minister of Information — September 1979 to 20 September 1979

=== Later career ===
Maïdou testified at Bokassa's trial in December 1986, stating he wanted to stage a coup even earlier but was unable due to the extensive espionage network. On 1 March 1988, Maïdou became president of the Union bancaire en Afrique centrale (UBAC). President Patassé named him deputy coordinator of the Dialogue national in November 2002. The Dialogue national was a national reconciliation conference, convened to reduce tensions in the country. He became an adviser to General Francois Bozize in July 2003, several months after Bozize seized power. In September, he resigned as head of the Dialogue national. Maïdou was the president of the first summit of the media conference Etats generaux des media centrafricains, held between 27 August and 1 September 2007. Between December 2008 and February 2009, he was second deputy chairman of the Dialogue political inclusif, at which point he became chairman of its monitoring committee.

== Awards ==
- Central African Orders of Academic Palms (1972)
- Sports Merit Gold Medal (1972)
- Postal Merit Officer (1972)
- Operation Bokassa Officer (1974)

== Notes ==
Political offices
| Preceded by Ange-Félix Patassé | Prime Minister of the Central African Empire; 1978–1979 | Empire abolished |
| Republic restored | Prime Minister of the Central African Republic; 1979 | Succeeded by Bernard Ayandho |
| New office | Vice President of the Central African Republic; 1979–1980 | Vacant Title next held by Abel Goumba |
