= François Péhoua =

Minister of the Economic Plan, International Cooperation, and Statistics
- In office 26 April 1971 – 1 November 1971
- President: Jean-Bédel Bokassa

Deputy Minister of Budget
- In office 25 November 1970 – 26 April 1971
- President: Jean-Bédel Bokassa

Personal details
- Born: 20 August 1936 Bangassou, Ubangi-Shari (now the Central African Republic)
- Died: 26 August 2000 (aged 64) Boissy-Saint-Léger, France
- Party: GIR; ADP
- Education: National Treasury School
- Occupation: Economist; Politician; Basketball Player

François Alfred Wilfried Péhoua (20 August 1936 - 26 August 2000), nicknamed Boston, was a Central African economist, politician, and basketball player.

== Early life and education ==
Born in Bangassou on 20 August 1936, Péhoua belonged to Yakoma. He completed his education at National Treasury School in Paris in 1961.

== Career ==
=== Finance and politics ===
Upon finishing his education in Paris, Péhoua returned to Bangui and worked as an accountant. He was then appointed as the head of the Central African Republic’s direct tax service. On 9 October 1962, he became a member of the Economic and Social Council until 1 January 1966. Apart from that, he also joined the National Commission for the Study of the Sango language on 2 June 1965 and the Kwa Ti Kodro's (Village Work) Managing Policy Committee on 14 April 1965.

Bokassa appointed Péhoua as his technical adviser on 13 March 1969. One month later, on 25 April, he became a trustee of the CAR treasury. From 1970 to 1971, he held ministerial positions such as Deputy Minister of Finance (25 November 1970 - 5 February 1971) and Minister of the Economic Plan, International Cooperation, and Statistics (26 April 1971 - 1 November 1971).

After stepping down as Minister of the Economic Plan, International Cooperation, and Statistics, Péhoua served as the president of the Central Bank of Equatorial African States and Cameroon (BCEAEC) Bangui Branch on 1 November 1971. On 25 June 1973, he was appointed as one of five BEAC national directors.

Péhoua announced his presidential candidacy for 1981 Central African presidential election on 14 February 1981. As an independent presidential candidate, he received support from Robert Galley's men and his name was unpopular among Central Africans. In the presidential election, he finished in third place with a total of 39,661 popular votes (5.42%).

After the election, he founded a political party Independent Grouping for Reflection (GIRA) on 22 April 1981. Moreover, he became the co-founder of the joint opposition coalition, the Provisional Political Council (CPP), on 2 April in Bangui. He was a supporter of Kolingba government who exerted powerful influence in it.

In October 1991, Pehoua established a political party ADP. He was elected as the President of the ADP party in December 1991. Pehoua was also the co-founder of an opposition group, Democratic Collective of Opposition Political Parties (CODEPO), in November 1995.

As a politician, CIA classified Pehoua as "moderate" opposition in its report published in 1983. Charles-Armel Doubane stated that Pehoua was his political mentor and a liberal democrat.

=== Basketball ===
Péhoua was a basketball player and played for Red Star Ndongo Club. He was the founder of the Central African Basketball Federation (FCBB) and Hit Trésor SC in 1961 and 1962, respectively. Apart from that, he also served in various position on basketball organization such as the president of the Central African Basketball Federation (FCBB), Preseident of FIBA Africa (1989 - 1993), Member of the Central Office of the Association of African Basketball Federations and Vice-President of FIBA Africa (1968-1980).

Under his tenure as a president of FCBB, he designed and built Martin Ngoko National Basketball Center (1974), constructed Bangui Sports Palace (1976), and organized Barthélemy Boganda Cup. Furthermore, Central African basketball team won FIBA Africa Championship 1974 and qualified for the 1974 FIBA World Championship.

== Death and personal life ==
Péhoua died on 26 August 2000 in Boissy-Saint-Léger at 12:30 PM due to a heart attack. He was buried in Bangui.

Pehoua's brother, José-Maria Pehoua, is a diplomat. His son, Eugène Pehoua-Pelema, is a basketball player.

== Awards ==
- Gold Medal of Sport Merit (1 May 1972).
- Knight Orders of Postal Merit (1 December 1972).
- Merit Grand Officer (24 December 1974).

== Bibliography ==
- Bradshaw, Richard; Rius, Juan Fandos (2016). Historical Dictionary of the Central African Republic (Historical Dictionaries of Africa). Lanham: Rowman & Littlefield.
- Doubane, Charles Armel (2015). Ma vie, ma vision pour le Centrafrique. Paris: L’Harmattan. ISBN 978-2-343-07700-0.
