= Jean-Claude Kazagui =

Central African politician

Minister of Higher Education and Scientific Research
- In office 21 September 1985 – 3 December 1987
- President: Andre Kolingba

Minister of Education
- In office 17 July 1978 – 14 February 1979
- Monarch: Bokassa I
- Prime Minister: Henri Maïdou
- Succeeded by: Jean Louis Psimhis

Personal details
- Born: 8 January 1937 Bangui, Ubangi-Shari (now the present-day Central African Republic)
- Died: 13 January 2025 (aged 88) Pessac, France
- Party: UDC
- Children: Ange Maxime Kazagui
- Education: University of Besançon

Jean-Claude Kazagui (8 January 1937 – 13 January 2025) was a Central African educator and politician who served as Minister of Education (1978–1979) and Minister of Higher Education and Scientific Research (1985–1987).

== Biography ==
Belonging to Nzakara, Kazagui was born in Bangui on 8 January 1937. He studied at a teacher college and earned an MA in English. In October 1967, he graduated from University of Besançon. Subsequently, he served as the principal of École normale supérieure (Higher Normal School) in Bangui in the 1970s.

Bokassa appointed Kazagui as adviser to the Imperial Court in Berengo in 1977. He then served as the Minister of Education on 17 July 1978. During his tenure as minister, Bokassa wanted to impose mandatory uniforms on schoolchildren, and he persuaded him not to do it since the country was in a difficult situation, which might have led to protests and rebellion. Nevertheless, the compulsory school uniform policy was imposed on 1 October 1978. On 31 January 1979, a student protest over scholarship issues broke out in Bouar, leading to the death of 3 people. After hearing this news, he tried to overcome the problem by visiting Bouar. On the following day, he arrived in the Bouar Airport bringing the students' scholarship funds and the commander of the town's garrison, Ambroise Ngbalé, forbade Kazagui from entering the town. He was dismissed as minister of education and his position was replaced by Jean Louis Psimhis on 14 February 1979.

On 14 March 1980, Kazagui was elected as Secretary General of Central African Democratic Union (UDC) after receiving 261 votes from the party's delegates. Serving as the secretary general of UDC, he became the head of the party's delegation visit to Pyongyang to attend 6th congress of Workers' Party of Korea (WPK) and the anniversary of 35th WPK birthday anniversary in October 1980. He became the High Commissioner for Scientific and Technological Research on 12 March 1983. Kolingba appointed him as Minister of Higher Education and Scientific Research on 21 September 1985, serving that position until 3 December 1987. He then served as the Head of Kolingba's cabinet from 1992 to 1993.

Kazagui died in Pessac on 13 January 2025. One of his children, Ange Maxime Kazagui, served as a minister.

== Bibliography ==
- Baccard, André (1987). Les Martyrs de Bokassa. Paris: Editions du Seuil.
- Bradshaw, Richard; Rius, Juan Fandos (2016). Historical Dictionary of the Central African Republic (Historical Dictionaries of Africa). Lanham: Rowman & Littlefield.
