= Florence Yagbao =

Central African teacher and First Lady (1934–1992)

First Lady of the Central African Republic
- In office 14 August 1960 – 1962
- Preceded by: Position created
- Succeeded by: Brigette Dacko

Personal details
- Born: Marie-Florence Yagbao; 26 February 1934 Bimbo, Ombella-M'Poko, Ubangi-Shari (present-day Central African Republic)
- Died: 18 January 1992 (aged 57) Central African Republic
- Spouse: David Dacko (m. 1952; div. 1962)
- Relations: Marthe Matongo (cousin)
- Children: Bruno Dacko

Marie-Florence Yagbao Dacko, also spelled Marie-Florence Yagbaou, (February 26, 1934 – January 18, 1992) was a Central African teacher who served as the inaugural First Lady of the Central African Republic from 1960 until her divorce from President David Dacko in 1962.

== Biography ==
Florence Yagbao was born on February 26, 1934, in Bimbo, Ubangi-Shari, in the present-day Central African Republic. She was a member of the Gbanziri people and her last name, Yagbao, is the Gbanziri language spelling of her surname. (Her last name was also spelled Yagbaou in some sources). Her father, Michel Lingoula, died before she was born, and her mother, Émilie Grassangou, also died when she was just nine months old. Now an orphan, Yagbao and her older sister, Ginette Geneviève Yasse, were raised by her uncle, Paul Raphaël Ounda, and aunt, Bangalo.

Following high school, the French governor sent Yagbao and her cousin, Marthe Matongo, to France to study to become teachers. Matongo, who was one year older than Yagbao, would later become the first woman elected to the National Assembly of the Central African Republic on 15 March 1964.

Yagbao returned to French Ubangi-Shari, where she became a teacher at the Route 37 School, now known as the Koudoukou School. Her colleague at Route 37 School was a fellow teacher named David Dacko. Yagbao and Dacko began dating, although her uncle opposed the relationship, since she was a Gbanziri while Dacko was Mbaka. The couple married in 1952. They had one son, Bruno Dacko, born on 2 November 1952, who became a Central African politician and former Minister of Tourism.

David Dacko became principal of Ecole de la Kouanga in Bangui in 1955. The family moved to Bangui's Lakouanga district. Dacko was elected to the Territorial Assembly in 1957 and was soon selected for various ministries and other government position. Ubangi-Shari changed its name to the Central African Republic in 1958.

David Dacko became president upon Barthélémy Boganda's death in May 1959 and the first President of an independent Central African Republic in 1960. As his wife, Florence Yagbao became the country's first First Lady in its history. In February 1960, Yagbao established Mode Égalité, a Central African women's association. She also co-founded l’UFCA -Union des femmes centrafricaines (UFCA - Union of Central African Women) with Marie-Joseph Franck, her director of social affairs. She reportedly became a close friend of Jacqueline Nguyen Thi Than, a Vietnamese immigrant and one of the wives of Jean-Bédel Bokassa, who would overthrow President Dacko in 1965.

Florence Yagbao served in the role of first lady and wife of the president from 1960 until their divorce in 1962. President Dacko soon married his second wife, Brigette Dacko, who became first lady for the rest of his presidency. After her divorce, Yagbao returned to her home in Lakouanga, where she lived with her family for the rest of her life.

Florence Yagbao died on 18 January 1992 at the age of 58. She was survived by her only son, Bruno Dacko. Her former husband, David Dacko, died in November 2003.
