= Timothée Malendoma =

Central African politician

Prime Minister of Central African Republic
- In office 4 December 1992 – 26 February 1993
- President: André Kolingba
- Preceded by: Edouard Frank
- Succeeded by: Enoch Derant Lakoué

Personal details
- Born: 1935 Dekoa, Ubangi-Shari
- Died: 12 December 2010 Bangui, Central African Republic
- Political party: Civic Forum

Timothée Malendoma (1935 – 12 December 2010) was a Central African politician who served as the 12th Prime Minister of the Central African Republic from 4 December 1992 to 26 February 1993. He was the President of the Civic Forum party.

== Early life ==
Timothée Malendoma was born in Dekoua (now in the Central African Republic) in 1935, joining the French Army in 1953. After fighting for France in the First Indochina War, he was trained as a military administrator in Montpellier.

== Political career ==
He was chosen by President Jean-Bédel Bokassa to become Minister of the National Economy in January 1966, and spent his time attempting to shut down diamond smuggling. However, the following year the influence of the smugglers proved too great and he was removed from his post. He returned to politics on 27 September 1979 when he was named Minister of State in the government of President David Dacko. He later formed his own political party in 1990.

Under Malendoma's leadership, the Civic Forum party participated in the "grand national debate" initiated by President André Kolingba in 1992, although such participation was opposed by the Consultative Group of Democratic Forces, an opposition coalition of which the Civic Forum was a member, which resulting in a suspension of the party by the coalition. On 4 December 1992, Malendoma was appointed as Prime Minister of the Central African Republic by Kolingba to succeed Edouard Frank; however, in February 1993, Kolingba accused Malendoma of "blocking the democratic process" and dismissed him. Malendoma was the candidate of the Civic Forum in the August 1993 presidential election, receiving 2.03% of the vote and taking sixth place.

Subsequently Malendoma was a deputy in the National Assembly and the Civic Forum was an opposition party under President Ange-Félix Patassé. As President of the Church of Christ – the King and the Faculty of Evangelical Theology of Bangui, he sought to attend a meeting of Protestant churches in New Caledonia but was barred from leaving the Central African Republic by the government on 12 October 1999.

After François Bozizé seized power in 2003, Malendoma remained in opposition. In March 2004 he objected to the presence of ousted Haitian President Jean-Bertrand Aristide in the Central African Republic, arguing that Aristide was "a dictator"—"we have had our fair share and we don't need anymore"—and that the country should not be "a dumping ground". He also said that in the Central African Republic "democracy is a luxury and opposition is a foreign concept".

In the 2005 parliamentary election, he ran for a seat in the National Assembly as a candidate of the Civic Forum from Mala constituency in Kémo Prefecture, but was defeated in the second round of voting by Fred Jacob Karouna.

== Death ==
Malendoma was admitted to Bangui General Hospital in late November 2010 suffering from a hypertensive emergency, and died on 12 December at the age of 75. Following his death, the Civic Forum did not participate in the subsequent election.

== Notes ==
Preceded by Edouard Frank	Prime Minister of the Central African Republic; 1992–1993	Succeeded by Enoch Derant Lakoué
