= Marthe Matongo =

Central African social worker, politician and women's rights activist (born 1933)

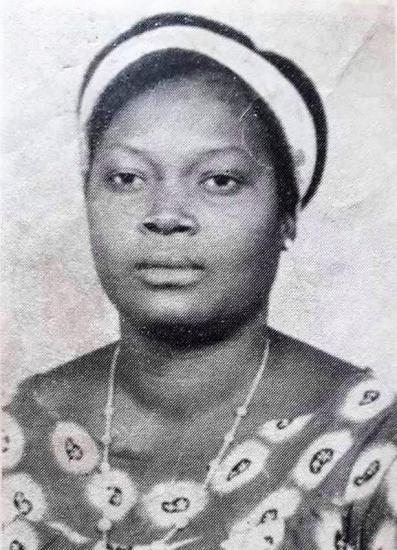

Member of the National Assembly
- In office 1964–1966

Personal details
- Born: 30 April 1933 (age 93) Bambari, Ubangi-Shari
- Party: MESAN

Marthe Matongo (born 30 April 1933) was a Central African social worker, politician and women's rights activist. In 1964 she became the first woman elected to the National Assembly.

== Biography ==
Matongo was born into a Gbanzili family in Bambari in April 1933. Her father Michel was a teacher, and Matongo became one of the first girls in Ubangi-Shari to earn a primary school certificate. She subsequently studied in France and became a social worker. At independence in 1960 her cousin Florence Yagbao became the inaugural First Lady of the Central African Republic.

A member of the Movement for the Social Evolution of Black Africa (MESAN), Matongo was a candidate in the 1964 parliamentary elections. MESAN was the sole legal party and ran unopposed, resulting in Matongo becoming the first woman in the National Assembly. In the same year she was one of the founders of the Union of Central African Women, becoming its secretary general, and broadcast a radio programme Magazine of the Women. The National Assembly was subsequently dissolved in 1966 following the Saint-Sylvestre coup d'état.
