= 1981 Central African presidential election =

Second election of David Dacko

- 15 March 1981
- Turnout: 76.66%
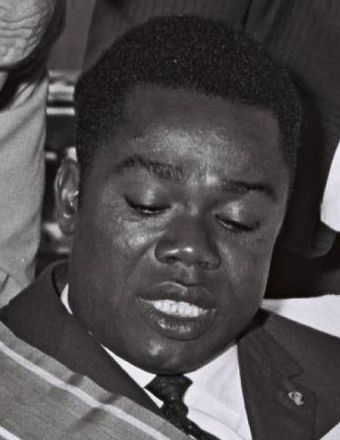

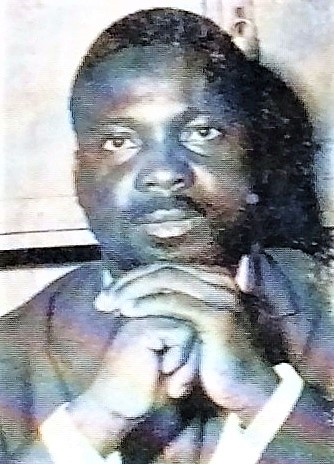
Nominee	David Dacko	Ange-Félix Patassé	François Péhoua
Party	UDC	MLPC	GIR
Popular vote	374,027	283,739	39,661
Percentage	51.10%	38.77%	5.42%
- Results by prefecture
President before election
David Dacko
UDC
Elected President
David Dacko
UDC

Presidential elections were held in the Central African Republic on 15 March 1981. They were the first national elections of any sort since 1964, the first elections since the overthrow of longtime ruler Jean-Bédel Bokassa in 1979, and the first multiparty presidential elections since independence. Five candidates—incumbent president David Dacko, Ange-Félix Patassé, François Pehoua, Henri Maïdou and Abel Goumba—stood in the election.

The elections were won by Dacko, who had been restored to power two years earlier as part of Operation Barracuda, which overthrew Emperor Bokassa I (Jean-Bédel Bokassa). Dacko tried to pose as the inheritor of Barthélemy Boganda, the national hero who founded the country.

The election was marred by overt election rigging and other election irregularities, leading the opposition to call for the annulment of the election and civil unrest throughout the country. In May, the legislative elections were postponed indefinitely. Following a terrorist attack by one of the opposition parties, opposition leaders were arrested, and some parties were briefly banned. On 1 September 1981, Dacko was overthrown by André Kolingba.

== Candidates ==
=== David Dacko ===
Having been restored to power as part of Operation Barracuda, Dacko was heavily supported by the French government with both money and troops on the ground. In February 1980, Dacko formed the Central African Democratic Union (UDC), which was a party in name only. Claiming it to be born from the ashes of Barthélemy Boganda's Movement for the Social Evolution of Black Africa, Dacko used the party to legitimize himself.

=== Abel Goumba ===
Abel Goumba was a physician who had been working for the World Health Organization in exile until his return to the country in 1981. He was Henri Maïdou's brother-in-law and one of Barthélemy Boganda's most loyal associates before being put in prison for two years by Dacko after the former's death. According to historian Thomas O'Toole, he was the real heir to Boganda.

Running under the Oubanguian Patriotic Front, which he had formed in exile, he was popular among progressive elements in France and a small circle of Bangui intellectuals.

=== Francois Gueret ===
Francois Gueret had previously served as head of various ministries under Dacko before his resignation in 1980 in protest of Dacko not doing enough to prosecute certain "untouchable" accomplices of Bokassa. His Mouvement pour la Democratie et l'Independence was anti-Sovietist, with an occasional pro-Chinese leftist bent among a few of its young supporters.

=== Henri Maïdou ===
Maïdou was a school teacher with a degree in geography and Goumba's brother-in-law. He had previously been Prime Minister during the Bangui children's massacre, which hindered any possible popularity. In 1980, he was dismissed by Dacko, which was met with unanimous indifference.

Running under his Republican Progressive Party, he was perceived by many outside observers to be the most intelligent and pro-French candidate.

=== Ange-Félix Patassé ===
Ange-Félix Patassé was a Sara agriculturist from Paoua. He had previously served as head of various ministries under Bokassa and had been placed under multiple house arrests and imprisonment in the Ngaragba Central Prison under Dacko's rule. On 30 October 1979, a French-supported grenade attack destroyed his home in Bangui.

Running under his Movement for the Liberation of the Central African People (MLPC), Patassé used a "unstructured and fluid mix" of populist-left rhetoric. He was popular among the young students and unemployed of Bangui.

=== François Péhoua ===
François Péhoua worked for the Bank of Central African States. He had briefly been a minister under Bokassa in 1971. His Independent Grouping for Reflection was a grouping of moderate government bureaucrats and technicians who opposed Dacko's growing power. An associate of Robert Galley, Péhoua had been encouraged to run by backers in Paris who were doubtful of Dacko's ability to defeat Patassé.

== Conduct ==
Dacko used vehicles furnished by the French government for the Ministry of Health for the campaign. Overt election rigging and other election irregularities put into doubt whether Dacko was the actual choice for a majority of the population.

== Results ==
Candidate	Party	Votes	%
David Dacko	Central African Democratic Union	374,027	51.10
Ange-Félix Patassé	Movement for the Liberation of the Central African People	283,739	38.77
François Péhoua	Independent Grouping for Reflection	39,661	5.42
Henri Maïdou	Republican Progressive Party	24,007	3.28
Abel Goumba	Oubanguian Patriotic Front	10,512	1.44
Total		731,946	100.00
Valid votes		731,946	98.29
Invalid/blank votes		12,742	1.71
Total votes		744,688	100.00
Registered voters/turnout		971,395	76.66
Source: EISA

== Aftermath ==
When the results were released in Bangui, Bossangoa, Markounda, and the Sara ethnic stronghold, riots broke out for two days, allowing Dacko to declare a state of emergency and send French troops into Bossangoa and Bangui. A pro-government militia was established that sent hundreds of armed UDC supporters to deal with the opposition-controlled areas of Bangui.

The four opposition candidates called on the Supreme Court to annul the election on the basis of vote rigging. They formed the Conseil Politique Provisoire (CPP) with Gueret and Rodolphe Iddi Lala of Central African National Liberation Movement (MCLN) to contest the upcoming legislative election as a single list. Accusing the opposition parties of encouraging tribalism, Dacko barred them from using the government-controlled radio and television. In May, Dacko postponed legislative elections indefinitely.

On July 14, the MCLN bombed a popular movie house in Bangui, killing three people and wounding around a dozen, declaring that such attacks would continue until French troops left the country. In response, Dacko ordered a state of siege, arrested the opposition leaders, and banned the MCLN, FPO, and MLPC, despite the CPP condemning the action. Dacko lifted the ban on the FPO and MLPC in August, viewing his position as increasingly precarious. On 1 September 1981, Dacko was overthrown by André Kolingba.
