= Félix Moloua =

Prime Minister of the Central African Republic since 2022

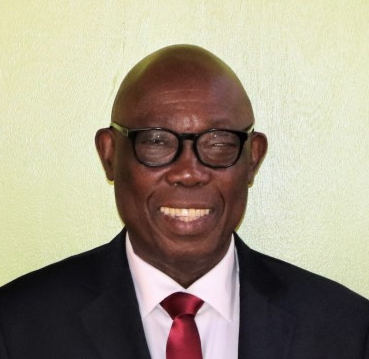
- Moloua in 2022

Prime Minister of the Central African Republic
- Incumbent
- Assumed office 7 February 2022
- President: Faustin-Archange Touadéra
- Preceded by: Henri-Marie Dondra

Personal details
- Born: June 1, 1957 (age 69) Bangui, Ubangi-Shari (present-day Central African Republic)
- Party: United Hearts Movement
- Profession: Politician, mathematician, teacher

Félix Moloua (born 1 June 1957) is a Central African politician and mathematician who has served as the prime minister of the Central African Republic since 7 February 2022. He was the previous minister of planning, economy and cooperation of the Central African Republic. Moloua has a background as a mathematician, physicist and demographer.

== Background, education and research ==
Moloua was born 1 June 1957 in Bangui, Central African Republic. He received a teaching certificate in Mathematics and Physics from the University of Bangui in 1981, continuing into a University Diploma in Scientific Studies in 1985. From 1993 to 1995 he completed a diplôme d'études supérieures spécialisées in Demography at the Institute of Training and Demographic Research of the University of Yaoundé II in Cameroon.

Moloua worked as a mathematics teacher at the lycée Marie-Jeanne Caron in Bangui from 1981 to 1986. Between 1986 and 2003, he taught at the University of Bangui, serving as a professor of physics and statistics/demography. He has authored three books on children and adolescents in the CAR.

== Political career ==
Félix Moloua was an early activist of the United Hearts Movement (MCU), a political party founded by president Faustin-Archange Touadéra in November 2018. Within the Executive Office of the MCU, he serves as a political adviser in charge of relations with other political parties and non-governmental organizations.

During the 2015-2016 presidential elections, Moloua was deputy national director of Touadéra's campaign. Following the election of Touadéra, on 11 April 2016, Moloua was appointed Minister of Economy, Planning and Cooperation under prime minister Simplice Sarandji. After Touadéra's re-election in 2020, Moloua was made Minister of State of Economy, Planning, and International Cooperation on June 23, 2021, under prime minister Henri-Marie Dondra.

On February 7, 2022, Touadéra removed Dondra from the role of prime minister, in part due to diplomatic tensions with France, replacing him with Moloua. After replacing the more pro-French Dondra, he was described by international media as a "technocrat" and a "Touadéra loyalist"; an anonymous Central African diplomat stated that he had "no political profile". On 10 February, Moloua formed his first government, re-appointing all 32 ministers who were in Dondra's cabinet, including himself, meaning he retained his position economic minister while serving as PM.

Moloua was re-appointed as both prime minister and Minister of State in Economy, Planning, and International Cooperation by Touadera in 2024.

== Other work ==
Between 1987 and 1992, Moloua served as head of department and director of the National Center for Scientific and Technical Information at the Secretariat of State. Moloua was the director of the Bank of Central African States (BEAC) from 2010 to 2013. He is currently an ex officio member on the Board of Governors of the African Development Bank (AfDB).

Political offices
Preceded by Henri-Marie Dondra	Prime Minister of the Central African Republic; 2022–2026	Incumbent
