= Bernard Ayandho =

Central African politician

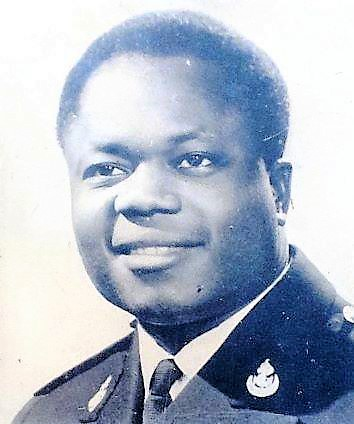

Prime Minister of the Central African Republic
- In office 26 September 1979 – 22 August 1980
- President: David Dacko
- Preceded by: Henri Maïdou
- Succeeded by: Jean-Pierre Lebouder

Personal details
- Born: Bernard Christian Ayandho; 15 December 1930; Bangassou, Ubangi-Shari
- Died: 18 December 1993 (aged 63); Paris, France

Bernard Ayandho (15 December 1930 – 18 December 1993) was a Central African politician and diplomat. He was Prime Minister of the Central African Republic from 26 September 1979 to 22 August 1980.

== Biography ==
Ayandho was born on 15 December 1930 in Bangassou. He was a member of the Yakoma ethnic group. He was educated at College moderne in Bambari and Ecole normale and Ecole des cadres in Brazzaville. On 24 September 1951, he became a deputy secretary in the civil service of French Equatorial Africa. Ayandho worked in the payment service in Bangui from 1951 to 1954, at which time he became secretary to Fort Crampel. In 1955 he became a finance agent. Ayandho was appointed leader of the Bimbo district in 1957 and served in this position until 1958. He received further education at the Ecole national de la France d'outre-mer, and after graduation returned to the Central African Republic. On 17 August 1960, he was appointed secretary-general of the Council of Ministers by President David Dacko. He became Minister of the national economy on 1 May 1964, and was appointed minister of rural action on 1 January 1962.

He was appointed high commissioner by President Jean-Bedel Bokassa on 20 January 1966. Ayandho became deputy minister of economic planning and technical assistance on 28 February 1969, then head of the ministry on 17 September. He was named minister of industry, mines, and geology on 4 February 1970, and the ministry was renamed mines and energy on 13 September 1971. He served in this role until 19 October. He became regional representative for Air Afrique in Gabon on 31 December, and was appointed economic counselor at the Central African Republic embassy in Libreville on 27 September 1975.

After Bokassa was overthrown, Ayandho was named prime minister on 26 September 1979. He had been disgraced for a number of years prior. He was considered a potential successor as president. On 22 August 1980, he was dismissed due to opposing President Dacko. Sylvestre Bangui resigned from the government in protest. Ayandho ran a private firm from 1980 to 1985, when he was named president of the Chamber of Commerce by President Andre Kolingba. Ayandho died on 18 December 1993 in Paris.

== Awards ==
- Central African Orders of Merit and Industrial and Artisanal Merit (1967)
- Liberian Order of the Star of Africa.
- Legion of Honor

== Notes ==
Political offices
Preceded by Henri Maïdou	Prime Minister of the Central African Republic; 1979–1980	Succeeded by Jean-Pierre Lebouder
