= Vice President of the Central African Republic =

Former political position in the Central African Republic

- Vice-président de la République centrafricaine
- Coat of arms of the Central African Republic
- Incumbent; Vacant since 15 March 2005
- Residence: Bangui
- Seat: Bangui
- Inaugural holder: Henri Maïdou
- Formation: 26 September 1979; 12 December 2003 (first reestablishment)

The Vice President of the Central African Republic was a political position in the Central African Republic created on three occasions.

The vice presidency will be re-established after a new constitution was approved in a referendum in 2023. The president has the power to appoint the vice president.

== Vice presidents ==
No.	Portrait	Name (Birth–Death)	Term of office			Political affiliation	President	Notes
No.	Portrait	Name (Birth–Death)	Took office	Left office	Time in office	Political affiliation	President	Notes
1		Henri Maïdou (born 1936)	26 September 1979	22 August 1980	331 days	MESAN	David Dacko	Resigned
Post abolished (22 August 1980 – 12 December 2003)
2		Abel Goumba (1926–2009)	12 December 2003	15 March 2005	1 year, 93 days	FPP	François Bozizé	Dismissed
Post abolished (15 March 2005 – present)

== See also ==
- President of the Central African Republic
- Prime Minister of the Central African Republic
