= Dacko =

Dacko is a surname. Notable people with the surname include:

- Brigette Dacko (1943–2023), Central African public figure, wife of David
- David Dacko (1930–2003), first President of the Central African Republic
- Didier Dacko (born 1967), Malian general
- Ryan Dacko (born 1978), independent filmmaker based in Syracuse, New York
- Scott Dacko, screenwriter and director
