= Henri-Marie Dondra =

Prime Minister of the Central African Republic

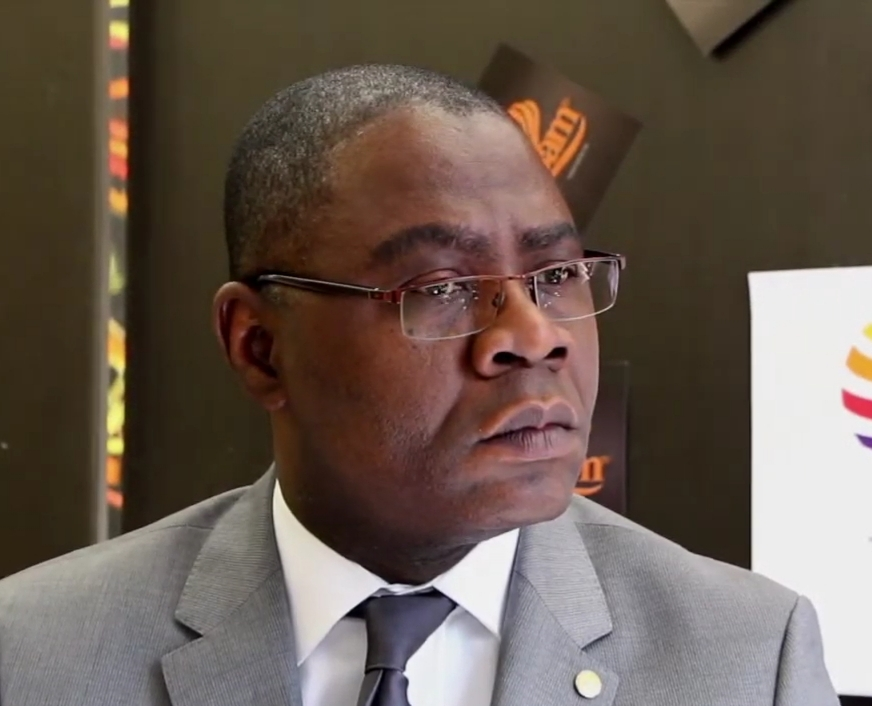

Prime Minister of the Central African Republic
- In office 15 June 2021 – 7 February 2022
- President: Faustin-Archange Touadéra
- Preceded by: Firmin Ngrébada
- Succeeded by: Félix Moloua

Minister of Finance and Budget
- In office 11 April 2016 – 10 June 2021
- President: Faustin-Archange Touadéra
- Prime Minister: Simplice Sarandji; Firmin Ngrébada
- Preceded by: Célestin Yanendji
- Succeeded by: Hervé Ndoba

Personal details
- Born: 14 August 1966 (age 60) Bangui, Central African Republic
- Party: Unité Républicaine
- Other political affiliations: MCU (2019–2021); Independent (2021–2023)

Henri-Marie Dondra (born 14 August 1966) is a Central African politician who served as the Prime Minister of the Central African Republic from 15 June 2021 to 7 February 2022.

== Biography ==
Dondra was born 14 August 1966 in Kinshasa, Democratic Republic of the Congo. He is married and has 5 children.

Dondra completed his bachelor's degree (G2 series) at the Cardinal Malula University in Kinshasa from 1984 to 1985. He then obtained a General University Diploma (DEUG) in Law from the University of Bangui in 1988-1989, where he also did a Bachelor's degree in Private Law in 1989-1990. He obtained a banking training diploma at the Banque Centrale Populaire in Casablanca (1990-1991), then received a Master's degree in Finance at the Catholic University of Lille and a diploma of specialized graduate studies (DESS) in finance at the International Polytechnic University of Benin in 2003.

Dondra then worked at the Moroccan-Central African Bank and then in the African Guarantee and Economic Cooperation Fund (FAGACE) from 1997 onward, where he held several senior positions, including that of managing director starting in 2009. He has also been president of the Professional Association of African Guarantee Institutions (APIGA) since 2014.

== Political career ==
Dondra planned to run in the 2015-2016 presidential election with his movement Les Réformateurs, but chose to support the candidacy of the eventual winner Faustin-Archange Touadéra. He was appointed as Minister of Finance and Budget by Touadéra on 11 April 2016 and served that role until 10 June 2021, being reappointed by Simplice Sarandji and Firmin Ngrébada.

In 2019, President Touadéra created his own political party, the United Hearts Movement (MCU). Dondra joined the MCU and became its second national executive secretary, after Sarandji. In the 2020 parliamentary elections, Dondra was elected MP for the first arrondissement of Bangui under the MCU.

=== Prime minister ===
On 11 June he was named prime minister by the country's presidency the day after the resignation of Firmin Ngrebada. This occurred as France had suspended its military cooperation and financial aid to the Central African Republic a few days before, accusing the government of complicity in an anti-French campaign orchestrated by Moscow.

In early February 2022, Dondra was removed from his position and replaced by his economy minister Felix Moloua. It has been suggested that his 2022 sacking was related to "tensions between pro-Russian and pro-French factions within the government", as Dondra was seen as more pro-French than his predecessor Firmin Ngrébada.

=== Republican Unity party ===
On November 26 2023, Henri-Marie Dondra announced his intentions of starting a new political party, the Republican Unity Party (French: Unité Républicaine, also known as UNIR), 21 months since his removal from the position of prime minister. The party was officially created on December 5 2023; it is self-described as politically centrist and reformist, voicing support for initiatives to foster peace, social cohesion and entrepreneurship.

==== 2025 Central African general election ====
UNIR officially endorsed Dondra's presidential bid for the 2025 Central African general election in May 2025. Dondra submitted his candidacy on October 8, but was not approved until November 14 due to the incumbent prime minister Faustin-Archange Touadéra accusing him of holding Congolese citizenship. Two of Dondra's brothers were arrested on March 19, leading Dondra to assert the "gradual assassination of our democracy".

The election was held on November 28; according to official results, Dondra received 3.19% of the votes, the 3rd most behind the Touadéra of the Union for Central African Renewal and Anicet-Georges Dologuélé of the United Hearts Movement. Dondra accused the elections of being fraudulent and demanded an annulment of the results on behalf of the UNIR, but later ceded the election.

Political offices
| Preceded by Firmin Ngrébada | Prime Minister of the Central African Republic; 2021–2022 | Succeeded by Félix Moloua |
