= Rodolphe Iddi Lala =

Founding leader of MCLN

Rodolphe Iddi Lala was a Central African academic, politician and militant leader. He was the founding leader of the Central African National Liberation Movement (MCLN).

== Early life and academic career ==
Of Gbeya ethnicity, Iddi Lala was born in 1948, in the town of Bossangoa, at Sassara village. He completed primary and high school in the Central African Republic (CAR), after which he moved to Bamako in Mali to study at the École fédérale des travaux publics (Federal School of Public Works). He was influenced by the Marxist politics dominant at that time in Mali. He then moved to Paris to study at the École Spéciale des Travaux Publics, but then switched to the École pratique des hautes études in October 1969, studying economics and social sciences and graduating in 1969 with a thesis on the marriage customs of the Gbeya. During his stay in Paris, he was active in the circles of the Union of Central African Students (UNECA) as well as the Association of African Black Students in Paris, where he networked with those would later occupy high positions in the CAR and also debated Marxist ideas. He obtained a doctorate in sociology from Paris Nanterre University in 1971. His PhD thesis focused on Central African politics with a Marxist perspective and criticised David Dacko as well as Barthélemy Boganda, claiming that they were accomplices in the misdeeds of capitals in the CAR. He was also opposed to Bokassa, whom he regarded as a dictator that was a puppet of French imperialism.

Despite these views, when he returned to Bangui in 1975, Iddi Lala was appointed a professor at the École nationale d'administration, a move that was deemed "difficult to understand" by Serre. Iddi Lala ended up resigning his post in protest in 1979 when Barthélemy Yangongo, who had opposed Bokassa's breaking of relations with Libya, was arrested. He fled to Brazzaville, where the Congolese government had been offering refuge to Central African dissidents, and took up an academic position.

== Political career and later years ==
Upon Bokassa's deposition later in 1979, Iddi Lala did not return to the CAR but instead joined the opposition against the reinstalled President David Dacko. He entered Abel Goumba's Ubangian Popular Front (FPO), where, according to Serre he was the Secretary General, and according to O'Toole he was responsible for external relations. He was expelled from the FPO in August 1980, and on 30 December 1980, formed the Central African National Liberation Movement (MCLN), a new political party that was financed by the Libyan government of Muammar Gaddafi. This movement did not gather many followers, so much that O'Toole regarded it as a "largely paper creation" and Iddi Lala as "one of the wild cards in the loose opposition coalition". On 14 May 1981, under the directions of Iddi Lalagh, who was based in Lagos at this time, the MCLN orchestrated a bombing of the cinema Le Club in Bangui, leading to three deaths and 32 injuries. Iddi Lala claimed responsibility for the attack, claiming that this was "the first blow" in a campaign that would last until every French soldier had left the CAR (French soldiers had been stationed in the country since they deposed Bokassa in 1979). The Central African government responded by banning the MCLN, arresting MCLN figures in the CAR and issuing an arrest warrant for Iddi Lala.

When Dacko was ousted by André Kolingba in a 1981 coup, Iddi Lala remained in exile and continued his opposition to Kolingba. He was tried in absentia by a military court and sentenced to death in May 1982. Iddi Lala's decision to commit the attack was not supported by all of his compatriots within the MCLN; indeed, he faced a leadership challenge in late 1983 when some members denounced the bombing as "off target". Iddi Lala was an ardent follower of socialism and used a rhetoric alluding to the interests of the masses.

He spent some time in Nigeria, then moved to Guinea-Bissau and finally to Ivory Coast. In 1984, Libyan support shifted to the Central African Revolutionary Party, formed by François Bozizé. Rodolphe Iddi Lala died in Ivory Coast in 1994. He was buried in his home village Sassara, at Bossangoa, in Central African Republic.
