= Simon Narcisse Bozanga =

Prime Minister of Central African Republic (1942–2010)

Prime Minister of the Central African Republic
- In office 4 April 1981 – 1 September 1981
- President: David Dacko
- Preceded by: Jean-Pierre Lebouder
- Succeeded by: Post abolished

Personal details
- Born: 26 December 1942; Bangassou, Ubangi-Shari
- Died: 7 June 2010 (aged 67); Amiens, France
- Spouse: Cécile Bozanga

Simon Narcisse Bozanga (26 December 1942 – 7 July 2010) was a Central African politician. He was Prime Minister of the Central African Republic from 4 April 1981 to 1 September 1981, when his government was overthrown by a military coup.

== Biography ==
Bozanga was born on 26 December 1942 in Bangassou. He was a member of the Nzakara ethnic group. He was educated in Bambari and Rouen, France. He studied law at the University of Nancy, the University of Paris, and Institut international d'administration publique.

Bozanga joined the Ministry of Foreign Affairs in the Central African Republic, becoming head of administrative and legal reports in 1972. He became secretary-general of the organization in 1974. Bozanga was Ambassador to Gabon from 1976 to 17 July 1978, at which point be was appointed minister of the government's secretariat. President David Dacko appointed Bozanga Minister of Justice on 16 July 1980. He became Prime Minister on 3 April 1981. He was criticized by opposition groups about the 1981 presidential election, sparking protests and confrontation. Bozanga was critical of François Mitterrand's government and accused France of interventionism. Bozanga was deposed along with the rest of the government by General André Kolingba in the coup of 1 September 1981.

Kolingba appointed Bozanga director of the Socite centrafricaine des hydrocarbures in April 1982, and he served until January 1984. Bozanga re-joined the Ministry of Foreign Affairs and was later an adviser to the Court of Appeals. In 2004, he was named a justice of the Supreme Court. In 2006, Bozanga was appointed by President François Bozizé the chairman of the Council of State.

Bozanga died on 7 July 2010 in Amiens, France.

== Notes ==
Political offices
| Preceded by Jean-Pierre Lebouder | Prime Minister of the Central African Republic; 1981 | Succeeded by Post Abolished |
