= Édouard Frank =

Central African magistrate and political figure

Prime Minister of the Central African Republic
- In office 15 March 1991 – 4 December 1992
- President: André Kolingba
- Preceded by: Post abolished (previously held by Simon Narcisse Bozanga)
- Succeeded by: Timothée Malendoma

Personal details
- Born: 5 April 1934 (age 90); Grimari, Ouaka, Central Africa

Édouard Frank (born 5 April 1934) is a Central African magistrate and political figure. He was Prime Minister of the Central African Republic from 15 March 1991 to 4 December 1992.

== Biography ==
Frank was born on 5 April 1934 in Grimari to Casimir Fra and Philomene Pagoundji. He attended Ecole primaire in Kouango and Ecole regionale in Bambari from 1942 to 1948 and Collège Emile Gentil from 1948 to 1954. Later, he studied at the Ecole normale d'instituteurs in Bambari. He began teaching in 1955. Frank studied law from 1963 to 1965 at the Institut des hautes études d'outre-mer (IHEOM), joining the judiciary service in July 1965. He pursued further studies at Jean-Bedel Bokassa University (since renamed the University of Bangui) from 1972 to 1976.

Frank was appointed to the Bangui Court of Appeals in 1973. He became Chairman of the Supreme Court in 1980. He was appointed as Ambassador to France on 27 February 1982 by President Andre Kolingba.

Frank presided over the 1986–1987 trial of former Emperor Jean-Bédel Bokassa. This was described in the press as "the first time in the history of post-colonial Africa that a former chief of state was put on public trial with full guarantees for his defense". Bokassa was sentenced to death at the end of the trial in June 1987. The sentence was later reduced to life imprisonment, and Bokassa was released in 1993. Frank became Cabinet Secretary on 5 January 1989.

Frank was named Prime Minister on 15 March 1991. He was dismissed from this role on 4 December 1992. Ange Felix Patasse appointed him as President of the Constitutional Court on 1 March 1996. After the 2003 coup in which General François Bozizé took power, Frank feared for his life and fled to France for four months. Later, Frank was appointed by Bozizé as Legal Adviser at the Presidency on 6 January 2006. He was dismissed from that post in July 2007.

He is retired and lives in Vichy, France. He has nine children, four of whom are in France, two are in Senegal and three are still in the Central African Republic.

== Awards ==
- Central African Order of Merit (1993)

== Notes ==
| Preceded by post abolished | Prime Minister of the Central African Republic; 1991–1992 | Succeeded by Timothée Malendoma |
