= Jean-Pierre Lebouder =

Central African politician

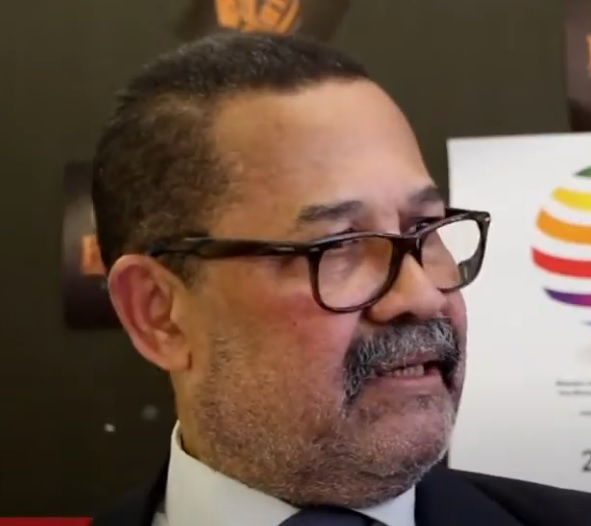

Prime Minister of the Central African Republic
- In office 12 November 1980 – 3 April 1981
- President: David Dacko
- Preceded by: Bernard Ayandho
- Succeeded by: Simon Narcisse Bozanga

Personal details
- Born: 1944 (age 81–82) Fort Sibut, Ubangi-Shari

Jean-Pierre Lebouder (born 1944) is a Central African agronomist and politician. He was Prime Minister of the Central African Republic from 12 November 1980 to 3 April 1981. He was also Minister of Finance from December 2003 to August 2004.

== Biography ==
Lebouder was born in 1944 in Fort Sibut. He belongs to the Gbanziri ethnic group. He was educated at the College Emile Gentil in Bangui and received a degree in agronomic engineering in 1971 from the Ecole nationale supericure agronomique in Toulouse, France. Lebouder was named the director of the Department of Studies and Coordination of the Ministry of Agriculture and Livestock. He was part of the delegation to the 57th session of the United Nations Food and Agriculture Organization Council, held from 1 to 4 November 1971. He also attended the 58th session on 26 November. Lebouder was acting director general of rural development between 1 November 1971 and 1 January 1972. In 1972, he was named office of studies director at the Union cotonniere centrafricaine (UCCA). Lebouder was appointed deputy director general of the UCCA on 30 November 1972 and was promoted to director general on 11 May 1974.

Emperor Jean-Bedel Bokassa made Lebouder minister of agriculture, livestock, water, forestry, hunting, fisheries, and tourism on 14 December 1976. On 17 July 1978, he was named minister of economic planning, general statistics, and international cooperation. In the David Dacko regime, Lebouder became minister of the economic plan and cooperation on 26 September 1979. Dacko named him acting prime minister on 1 September 1980, and Lebouder became prime minister on 12 November. He replaced Bernard Ayandho as prime minister. However, Dacko removed him from this post on 4 April 1981.

After his stint as prime minister, Lebouder worked for the World Bank and a representative to the International Monetary Fund in Lomé, Togo until 2002. He was appointed minister of planning, economy, finances, budget, and international cooperation on 13 December 2003. In this role, he led negotiations with the International Monetary Fund to gain $8.2 million in a postconflict program. Lebouder also secured a repatriation agreement from timber and mining corporations to help the government's financial issues. To slash spending, he announced that civil servants in a higher pay bracket would see their salaries cut. He announced his resignation on 9 August 2004, with the resignation taking effect on 15 August. The primary reason for that resignation was related to the implications of Medard Bemba, a financial advisor to François Bozizé, in a money laundering scheme in the construction of the headquarters of the Confédération africaine de la soie.

== Notes ==
Preceded by Bernard Ayandho	Prime Minister of the Central African Republic; 1980–1981	Succeeded by Simon Narcisse Bozanga
