= List of heads of government of the Central African Republic =

Prime Minister of the Central African Republic
- Premier Ministre de la République Centrafricaine (French)
- Coat of arms of the Central African Republic

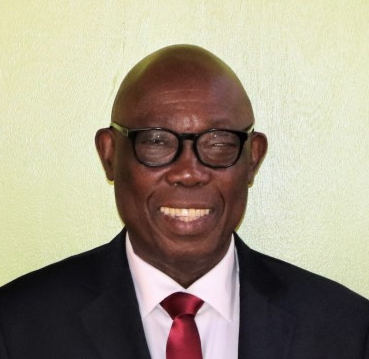
- Incumbent; Félix Moloua since 7 February 2022
- Member of: Council of Ministers
- Seat: Bangui
- Appointer: President of the Central African Republic
- Term length: at the pleasure of the president
- Constituting instrument: Constitution of the Central African Republic
- Formation: 13 August 1960; 66 years ago
- First holder: David Dacko

There have been twenty-five heads of government of the Central African Republic and the Central African Empire. The office of prime minister, the head of government, was created when Ubangi-Shari, a French colony, became an autonomous territory of France (as the Central African Republic) in December 1958. It was originally the highest post of the Central African Republic, though France did maintain a governor in the territory. After the Central African Republic declared its independence on 13 August 1960, David Dacko held both the prime minister and newly created president of the Central African Republic posts briefly before eliminating the prime minister position and placing all executive power in the office of the President.

President Jean-Bédel Bokassa restored the office of prime minister to assist him in governing the country in 1975, shortly before he declared himself emperor. He selected as prime minister Elisabeth Domitien, who become Africa's first female head of government. After Domitien was removed from office, Bokassa named Ange-Félix Patassé to become his next prime minister. Patassé continued serving as prime minister after Bokassa declared the establishment of the Central African Empire in December 1976. Henri Maïdou succeeded Patassé and continued serving as prime minister after Bokassa was overthrown from power. During the following two years of Dacko's presidency, three more politicians served as prime minister. The post was abolished when Dacko was overthrown from the presidency by André Kolingba on 1 September 1981. The position, as it exists today, was recreated in 1991, when President Kolingba was forced to relinquish some of the executive power. The president has the authority to name the prime minister and can remove them from office at any time. The prime minister is the head of the government; within days of being appointed, they must select individuals for their Cabinet, who they will work with to coordinate the government.

The current prime minister of the Central African Republic is Félix Moloua, since 7 February 2022.

== List of officeholders ==
Political parties

Movement for the Social Evolution of Black Africa (MESAN)
Central African Democratic Union (UDC)
Central African Democratic Rally (RDC)
Civic Forum (FC)
Social Democratic Party (PSD)
Movement for the Liberation of the Central African People (MLPC)
National Unity Party (PUN)
Patriotic Front for Progress (FPP)
United Hearts Movement (MCU)

Other affiliations

Independent

No.	Portrait	Name (Birth–Death)	Term of office			Political affiliation	Government	Head(s) of state (Term/Reign)	Ref.
No.	Portrait	Name (Birth–Death)	Took office	Left office	Time in office	Political affiliation	Government	Head(s) of state (Term/Reign)	Ref.
Central African Republic (1958–1960; autonomous within the French Community)
1		Barthélemy Boganda (1910–1959)	8 December 1958^{[A]}	29 March 1959^{[B]}	111 days	MESAN	—	—	
—		Abel Goumba (1926–2009) acting	30 March 1959	30 April 1959	31 days	MESAN	—	—	
2		David Dacko (1930–2003)	1 May 1959	13 August 1960	1 year, 104 days	MESAN	—	—	
Central African Republic (1960–1976; independent)
1		David Dacko (1930–2003)	13 August 1960	14 August 1960^{[C]}	1 day	MESAN	—	Himself (1960–1966)	
Post abolished (14 August 1960 – 1 January 1975)								Himself (1960–1966)	
Post abolished (14 August 1960 – 1 January 1975)								Bokassa (1966–1976)	
2		Elisabeth Domitien (1925–2005)	2 January 1975^{[D]}	7 April 1976^{[E]}	1 year, 96 days	MESAN	—	Bokassa (1966–1976)	
Vacant (8 April 1976 – 4 September 1976)								Bokassa (1966–1976)	
3		Ange-Félix Patassé (1937–2011)	5 September 1976	3 December 1976^{[F]}	89 days	MESAN	—	Bokassa (1966–1976)	
Central African Empire (1976–1979)
1		Ange-Félix Patassé (1937–2011)	8 December 1976	14 July 1978	1 year, 218 days	MESAN	Patassé	Bokassa I (1976–1979)	
2		Henri Maïdou (born 1936)	14 July 1978	21 September 1979	1 year, 69 days	MESAN	Maïdou I	Bokassa I (1976–1979)	
Central African Republic (1979–present)
4		Henri Maïdou (born 1936)	21 September 1979	26 September 1979^{[G]}	5 days	MESAN	Maïdou II	David Dacko (1979–1981)	
5		Bernard Ayandho (1930–1993)	26 September 1979	22 August 1980^{[H]}	331 days	MESAN	—	David Dacko (1979–1981)	
5		Bernard Ayandho (1930–1993)	26 September 1979	22 August 1980^{[H]}	331 days	UDC^{[I]}	—	David Dacko (1979–1981)	
Vacant (23 August 1980 – 11 November 1980)								David Dacko (1979–1981)	
6		Jean-Pierre Lebouder (born 1944)	12 November 1980	4 April 1981	143 days	UDC	—	David Dacko (1979–1981)	
7		Simon Narcisse Bozanga (1942–2010)	4 April 1981	1 September 1981	150 days	UDC	—	David Dacko (1979–1981)	
Post abolished (2 September 1981 – 14 March 1991)								André Kolingba (1981–1993)	
8		Édouard Frank (born 1934)	15 March 1991	4 December 1992	1 year, 264 days	RDC	—	André Kolingba (1981–1993)	
9		Timothée Malendoma (1935–2010)	4 December 1992	26 February 1993^{[J]}	84 days	FC	—	André Kolingba (1981–1993)	
10		Enoch Derant Lakoué (born 1945)	26 February 1993	25 October 1993	241 days	PSD	—	André Kolingba (1981–1993)	
10		Enoch Derant Lakoué (born 1945)	26 February 1993	25 October 1993	241 days	PSD	—	Ange-Félix Patassé (1993–2003)	
11		Jean-Luc Mandaba (1943–2000)	25 October 1993	12 April 1995^{[K]}	1 year, 169 days	MLPC	—	Ange-Félix Patassé (1993–2003)	
12		Gabriel Koyambounou (born 1947)	12 April 1995	6 June 1996	1 year, 55 days	MLPC	—	Ange-Félix Patassé (1993–2003)	
13		Jean-Paul Ngoupandé (1948–2014)	6 June 1996	30 January 1997	238 days	PUN	—	Ange-Félix Patassé (1993–2003)	
14		Michel Gbezera-Bria (born 1946)	30 January 1997^{[L]}	4 January 1999	1 year, 339 days	Independent	Gbezera-Bria	Ange-Félix Patassé (1993–2003)	
15		Anicet-Georges Dologuélé (born 1957)	4 January 1999	1 April 2001^{[M]}	2 years, 87 days	Independent	Dologuélé I	Ange-Félix Patassé (1993–2003)	
15		Anicet-Georges Dologuélé (born 1957)	4 January 1999	1 April 2001^{[M]}	2 years, 87 days	Independent	Dologuélé II	Ange-Félix Patassé (1993–2003)	
15		Anicet-Georges Dologuélé (born 1957)	4 January 1999	1 April 2001^{[M]}	2 years, 87 days	Independent	Dologuélé III	Ange-Félix Patassé (1993–2003)	
16		Martin Ziguélé (born 1957)	1 April 2001	15 March 2003^{[N]}	1 year, 348 days	MLPC	Ziguélé I	Ange-Félix Patassé (1993–2003)	
16		Martin Ziguélé (born 1957)	1 April 2001	15 March 2003^{[N]}	1 year, 348 days	MLPC	Ziguélé II	Ange-Félix Patassé (1993–2003)	
16		Martin Ziguélé (born 1957)	1 April 2001	15 March 2003^{[N]}	1 year, 348 days	MLPC	Ziguélé III	Ange-Félix Patassé (1993–2003)	
17		Abel Goumba (1926–2009)	23 March 2003	11 December 2003^{[O]}	263 days	FPP	Goumba	François Bozizé (2003–2013)	
18		Célestin Gaombalet (1942–2017)	12 December 2003	11 June 2005^{[P]}	1 year, 181 days	Independent	Gaombalet I	François Bozizé (2003–2013)	
18		Célestin Gaombalet (1942–2017)	12 December 2003	11 June 2005^{[P]}	1 year, 181 days	Independent	Gaombalet II	François Bozizé (2003–2013)	
19		Élie Doté (born 1947)	13 June 2005	18 January 2008^{[Q]}	2 years, 219 days	Independent	Doté I	François Bozizé (2003–2013)	
19		Élie Doté (born 1947)	13 June 2005	18 January 2008^{[Q]}	2 years, 219 days	Independent	Doté II	François Bozizé (2003–2013)	
19		Élie Doté (born 1947)	13 June 2005	18 January 2008^{[Q]}	2 years, 219 days	Independent	Doté III	François Bozizé (2003–2013)	
20		Faustin-Archange Touadéra (born 1957)	22 January 2008	17 January 2013	4 years, 361 days	Independent	Touadéra I	François Bozizé (2003–2013)	
20		Faustin-Archange Touadéra (born 1957)	22 January 2008	17 January 2013	4 years, 361 days	Independent	Touadéra II	François Bozizé (2003–2013)	
20		Faustin-Archange Touadéra (born 1957)	22 January 2008	17 January 2013	4 years, 361 days	Independent	Touadéra III	François Bozizé (2003–2013)	
21		Nicolas Tiangaye (1956–2026)	17 January 2013	10 January 2014^{[R]}	358 days	Independent	Tiangaye I	François Bozizé (2003–2013)	
21		Nicolas Tiangaye (1956–2026)	17 January 2013	10 January 2014^{[R]}	358 days	Independent	Tiangaye II	Michel Djotodia (2013–2014)	
21		Nicolas Tiangaye (1956–2026)	17 January 2013	10 January 2014^{[R]}	358 days	Independent	Tiangaye III	Michel Djotodia (2013–2014)	
—		André Nzapayeké (born 1951) acting	25 January 2014	10 August 2014	197 days	Independent	Nzapayeké	Catherine Samba-Panza (2014–2016)	
—		Mahamat Kamoun (born 1961) transitional	10 August 2014	2 April 2016	1 year, 236 days	Independent	Kamoun I	Catherine Samba-Panza (2014–2016)	
—		Mahamat Kamoun (born 1961) transitional	10 August 2014	2 April 2016	1 year, 236 days	Independent	Kamoun II	Catherine Samba-Panza (2014–2016)	
—		Mahamat Kamoun (born 1961) transitional	10 August 2014	2 April 2016	1 year, 236 days	Independent	Kamoun III	Catherine Samba-Panza (2014–2016)	
—		Mahamat Kamoun (born 1961) transitional	10 August 2014	2 April 2016	1 year, 236 days	Independent	Kamoun IV	Faustin-Archange Touadéra (2016–present)	
22		Simplice Sarandji (born 1955)	2 April 2016	27 February 2019	2 years, 331 days	Independent	Sarandji I	Faustin-Archange Touadéra (2016–present)	
22		Simplice Sarandji (born 1955)	2 April 2016	27 February 2019	2 years, 331 days	Independent	Sarandji II	Faustin-Archange Touadéra (2016–present)	
23		Firmin Ngrébada (born 1968)	27 February 2019	15 June 2021	2 years, 108 days	Independent	Ngrébada	Faustin-Archange Touadéra (2016–present)	
23		Firmin Ngrébada (born 1968)	27 February 2019	15 June 2021	2 years, 108 days	MCU	Ngrébada	Faustin-Archange Touadéra (2016–present)	
24		Henri-Marie Dondra (born 1966)	15 June 2021	7 February 2022	237 days	Independent	Dondra	Faustin-Archange Touadéra (2016–present)	
25		Félix Moloua (born 1957)	7 February 2022	Incumbent	4 years, 283 days	MCU	Moloua I	Faustin-Archange Touadéra (2016–present)	
25		Félix Moloua (born 1957)	7 February 2022	Incumbent	4 years, 283 days	MCU	Moloua II	Faustin-Archange Touadéra (2016–present)	

== Footnotes ==
- ^{A} Goumba had served as President of the Government Council since 26 July 1958. When the Central African Republic became a territorial autonomy, he served as the acting leader the government from 1 December 1958 to 8 December 1958.
- ^{B} Boganda was killed in a mysterious plane crash on 29 March 1959, while en route to Bangui. The exact cause of the crash was not determined, but sabotage was widely suspected. Experts found a trace of explosives in the plane's wreckage, but revelation of this detail was withheld. Although those responsible for the crash were never identified, people have suspected the French secret service, and even Boganda's wife, of being involved.
- ^{C} Dacko removed the prime minister position and consolidated power in the presidency.
- ^{D} President for Life Jean-Bédel Bokassa established a new government on 2 January 1975 and reintroduced the position of prime minister. He appointed Domitien as president of MESAN and Prime Minister of the Central African Republic.
- ^{E} Domitien was removed from office because she publicly expressed her disapproval of Bokassa's plans to establish a monarchy in the Central African Republic. Bokassa then had her placed under house arrest.
- ^{F} On 4 December 1976, Bokassa instituted a new constitution and declared the republic a monarchy, the Central African Empire.
- ^{G} President Dacko appointed Maïdou as vice president on 27 September 1979.
- ^{H} Prime Minister Ayandho was dismissed from office on 22 August 1980 by Dacko, who saw him as a political threat, and placed under house arrest.
- ^{I} Dacko created the Central African Democratic Union in February 1980 as the country's only political party.
- ^{J} Malendoma was removed as prime minister and replaced by Lakoué.
- ^{K} In April 1995, Mandaba resigned as prime minister, preempting a threatened vote of no-confidence from his own party, following accusations of incompetence and corruption.
- ^{L} Gbezera-Bria was named prime minister on 30 January 1997 to replace Ngoupande, who had been accused of siding with disgruntled soldiers, who had sparked a mutiny on 15 November 1996 to demand higher wages. Ngoupande also didn't strongly support President Patassé's decision to call in French troops to suppress the soldier uprising.
- ^{M} President Patassé fired Dologuélé on 1 April 2001 and replaced him with Ziguélé, a senior diplomat who had served as ambassador to Benin for the last two years. Patassé did not provide an explanation for his decision, but political observers state that the nonpartisan Dologuélé had become widely unpopular with the ruling MLPC party.
- ^{N} Ziguélé left office when François Bozizé seized power on 15 March 2003.
- ^{O} On 11 December 2003, Goumba was dismissed as prime minister and was appointed as vice president.
- ^{P} Gaombalet resigned as prime minister on 11 June 2005 after being elected as Speaker of the National Assembly on 7 June.
- ^{Q} In mid-January 2008, members of the National Assembly filed a censure motion against the Doté government, in response to countrywide civil service strike initiated by trade unions to protest the government's failure to pay arrears to government employees. On 18 January, Doté announced his resignation as prime minister.
- ^{R} Tiangaye resigned with President Michel Djotodia in N'Djamena, Chad on 10 January 2014.

== See also ==
- History of the Central African Republic
  - List of colonial governors of Ubangi-Shari
- Politics of the Central African Republic
- List of heads of state of the Central African Republic
- Vice President of the Central African Republic
