= Republican Progressive Party =

Republican Progressive Party (French: Parti Progressif Républicain, PPR) was a political party in the Central African Republic. The PPR was led by Henri Maïdou, a former Prime Minister in Jean-Bédel Bokassa's cabinet. Maïdou was the PPR candidate in the 1981 presidential elections and finished fourth of five candidates with 3% of the vote.
