= One Tower =

One Tower may refer to:

- One Tower (Moscow), a skyscraper under construction in Moscow
- One Tower (Balneário Camboriú), a skyscraper residences in Balneário Camboriú
- The One Tower, a 51-floor tower in Dubai
