= Elisabeth Domitien =

Central African politician

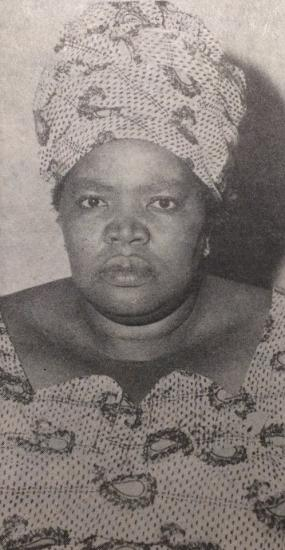
- Domitien in 1974

Prime Minister of the Central African Republic
- In office 2 January 1975 – 4 April 1976
- President: Jean-Bédel Bokassa
- Preceded by: David Dacko
- Succeeded by: Ange-Félix Patassé

Personal details
- Born: 1925 Lobaye, Ubangi-Shari (now Central African Republic)
- Died: 26 April 2005 (aged 79–80) Bimbo, Central African Republic
- Party: Movement for the Social Evolution of Black Africa

Elisabeth Domitien (1925 – 26 April 2005) served as the prime minister of the Central African Republic from 1975 to 1976. She was the first and to date only woman to hold the position, and was the first woman to serve as prime minister of a country in Africa.

== Family background ==
Domitien was born in Lobaye, Ubangi-Shari. The family had a plantation, and her father was employed in the postal service while her mother was a farmer.

== Early life and career ==
Domitien was the eldest child and the only daughter. She received only rudimentary instruction in reading and writing in a Catholic school and learned cooking and sewing. She spent much of her time working in the field and helped to sell farm products. However, she learned to deal with numbers and established herself as a farmer and business woman. She had a strong personality and was enterprising, making her popular among the village women and an informal leader in the community. At the age of 20 she became involved in the liberation struggle.

== Political life ==
Domitien mobilized the population with her speeches in Sangho, helped unite different groups and created a sense of national identity. She became head of the women's group in the independence movement, the Movement for the Social Evolution of Black Africa (MESAN). She collaborated closely with Barthélémy Boganda, the founder of the movement, and became president of the party in 1953. The country became independent in 1960 and Domitien collaborated with the first president of the Central African Republic, David Dacko, and the commander-in-chief, Jean-Bédel Bokassa. She served as a political adviser both to the leaders and to ordinary people, trying to reconcile different interests and improve the living standards of the population. Dacko ruled in an authoritarian way and the country soon became a one-party state with MESAN as the sole legal party. In 1965 Bokassa seized power in a coup, abolished the constitution, dissolved parliament and appointed himself as the head of the party, state and government with legislative and executive power.

== Prime Minister ==
In 1972 Bokassa declared himself president for life and made Domitien vice president of the party. In 1973 she led the first national congress of Central African farmers. She was clever and industrious, appealed to the population and served as a unifying force which Bokassa needed. In 1974 he declared himself as marshal. He had a cabinet in which the ministers changed constantly and on 2 January 1975 he formed a new government. Here Bokassa introduced the post of prime minister and Elisabeth Domitien was appointed to the position. It was the International Women's Year and Bokassa wanted to draw positive notice to himself internationally by appointing a woman in a leading position. She was the first woman to serve as prime minister of an African nation.

Domitien worked to strengthen the income and position of women. She was criticized by some people in CAR for the support she gave Bokassa. In her view the population should follow their leader. At the same time, she demanded that the president should respect the people and safeguard their interests. She was not afraid to voice her opinion, even to the president, and got many people out of jail after they were arrested without trial. Her relationship with Bokassa soured when he wanted to proclaim himself emperor. When Domitien opposed the plan, she was promptly fired and her cabinet was dismissed (7 April 1976).

== Later life ==
With the overthrow of Bokassa in September 1979, Domitien was arrested and brought to trial on charges of covering up extortion committed by Bokassa during her tenure as prime minister. She served a brief prison term and was put on trial in 1980, after which she was prohibited from returning to politics. In 1981, the military gained control again and ruled for 12 years. In 1993, it was replaced by a civilian government and Ange-Félix Patassé was elected president. Domitien received compensation for the unjust treatment she had been exposed to. She remained a prominent figure, both as a former politician and as a businesswoman, and was buried with official honours when she died in 2005.

== Personal life ==
Domitien married twice; her first husband was Jean Baka who was an accountant in a river company and commuted back and forth between Bangui and Brazzaville. They had a daughter, Beatrice in 1941, but were eventually divorced. Later, Domitien married Ngouka-Langadiji who was mayor and ran a coffee plantation in the Mobaye region east of the capital. He had several wives and did not move when he married Elisabeth. She lived alone in Bangui, and her husband came to visit her.

Political offices
Preceded by David Dacko	Prime Minister of the Central African Republic; 1975–1976	Succeeded by Ange-Félix Patassé
