= Anne-Marie Ngouyombo =

Central African politician

Minister of Tourism and Crafts
- In office 19 June 2005 – 31 January 2006
- President: François Bozizé
- Prime Minister: Élie Doté
- Preceded by: Bruno Dacko (tourism development)
- Succeeded by: Mohamed Mahdi Marboua

Minister of Social Affairs, Family Promotion and the Disabled
- In office 15 January 1999 – 1 November 1999
- President: Ange-Félix Patassé
- Prime Minister: Anicet-Georges Dologuélé
- Preceded by: Éliane Mokodopo
- Succeeded by: Rachel Dea

Mayor of Bangui
- In office 1995–1995
- Preceded by: Raymond Behorou
- Succeeded by: Olivier Gabirault

Personal details
- Born: 22 February 1955 (age 71) Dekoa, Ubangi-Shari (now the present-day Central African Republic)
- Party: MLPC (until 2005)

Anne-Marie Ngouyombo (née Wessanou; born 22 February 1955) is a Central African politician who served as the Mayor of Bangui in 1995 and ministers in two different positions.

== Early life ==
Ngouyombo was born in Dekoa on 22 February 1955, as Anne-Marie Wessanou. She studied law and then worked as a primary school teacher before becoming a senior officer.

== Political career ==
Ngouyombo joined Patasse's party, MLPC, and served as the leader of the party's women's wing, Central African Women's Liberation Movement (MLFC). She ran in the 1993 election as the representative of Bangui's eighth district and won a seat at the National Assembly. She served as the Deputy Mayor of Bangui in 1994.

In 1995, Patasse appointed Ngouyombo as the mayor of Bangui, and she held this position for less than a year until she was replaced by Olivier Gabirault. She then served as the Minister of Social Affairs, Family Promotion, and the Disabled from 15 January 1999 until 1 November. Afterward, she worked in various positions, such as leading the Supreme Court and Central African Federation of School and University Sports (FECASSU) and being an executive member of the Central African National Olympic and Sports Committee (CNOFA).

In 1999, MLPC faced a political crisis following the formation of Dologuélé Government II, in which many of its cadres accused Dologuélé of favoring his close friends in filling the ministerial position in his cabinet. In this situation, Ngouyombo joined the party's dissident group.

Upon the 2003 coup, Ngouyombo was temporarily imprisoned in June 2003. Bozize appointed her Minister of Tourism and Crafts on 19 June 2005, prompting her expulsion from the MLPC party. However, on 18 October, she was suspended from her ministerial post for three months due to the accusation of receiving salaries on par with the 3rd class 1st echelon civil servants, although she worked as an assistant teacher. In January 2006, she was dismissed as the minister of Tourism and Crafts.

Ngouyombo ran as an independent candidate in the 2020–21 Central African general election.

== Personal life ==
Ngouyombo belongs to Mandja. She is also a member of the Evangelical Church and once became the president of the Union of Sisters and Evangelical Church (USEE).
