= Bouchia =

- Location in Central African Republic
- Coordinates: 3°45′42″N 18°9′58″E
- Country: Central African Republic
- Prefecture: Lobaye
- Sub-prefecture: Mbaïki
- Commune: Mbata

Bouchia is a village situated in Lobaye Prefecture, Central African Republic. It is the birthplace of the first president of the Central African Republic, David Dacko.

== History ==
In 2020, agricultural cooperatives were created in Bouchia. CPC rebel occupied Bouchia in December 2020.

Around the end of July 2022, torrential rain fell in Bouchia and caused nine people to die due to the fallen tree.

== Healthcare ==
Bouchia has one health center.
