= Brigette Dacko =

First Lady of the Central African Republic (1943–2023)

First Lady of the Central African Republic
- In office 1962 – 1 January 1966
- President: David Dacko
- Preceded by: Florence Dacko
- Succeeded by: Catherine Denguiadé
- In office 20 September 1979 – 1 September 1981
- President: David Dacko
- Preceded by: Catherine Denguiadé (as Empress)
- Succeeded by: Mireille Kolingba

Personal details
- Born: Brigette Teya; 19 June 1943 Nzongo, Ubangi-Shari (present-day Central African Republic)
- Died: 31 March 2023 (aged 79) Bangui, Central African Republic
- Spouse: David Dacko (m. 1962; died 2003)

Brigette Teya Dacko (19 June 1943 – 31 March 2023) was a Central African public figure who served as the First Lady of the Central African Republic during the presidency of her husband, former President David Dacko.

== Biography ==
Dacko was born on 19 June 1943 in Nzongo, Ubangi-Shari. A member of the Mbaka people (Ngbaka), she was from the city of Bimbo, Ombella-M'Poko (now part of Bangui prefecture).

In 1962, President David Dacko divorced his first wife, Florence Dacko, and soon married Brigette Dacko later that same year. Brigette Dacko was appearing at diplomatic and protocol events as first lady and wife of the president by June 1962. She was the Central African Republic's first lady from her marriage in 1962 until the 1965 Saint-Sylvestre coup d'état which overthrew President Dacko. She was once again first lady from September 1979 to September 1981 when President Dacko briefly returned to power.

In December 2008, Dacko took part in ceremonies marking the 50th anniversary of the proclamation of the Central African Republic.

Brigette Dacko died in Bangui on 31 March 2023 at the age of 79. Her funeral was held on 14 April 2023, with President Faustin-Archange Touadéra and First Lady Brigitte Touadéra laying a wreath at the ceremony. Other dignitaries in attendance included former President Catherine Samba-Panza and former First Lady Mireille Kolingba. Following her funeral ceremony, President Touadéra posthumously awarded Dacko with the title of Commander of the Order of Central African Merit.

Dacko was buried next to her husband, David Dacko, in the village of Mokinda in Lobaye prefecture, on 15 April 2023.

== Honors ==
- Commander of the Order of Central African Merit (Posthumous 14 April 2023).
