= Independent Grouping for Reflection =

The Independent Grouping for Reflection (French: Groupement Indépendant de Reflexion, GIR) was a political party in the Central African Republic. The GIR was led by François Péhoua, a former minister in the Bokassa cabinet. Pehoua was the GIR candidate in the 1981 presidential elections, finishing third of five candidates with 5% of the vote. GIR was generally based amongst bureaucrats and technocrats.
