= Company of the Upper Ubangi Sultanates =

Concessionary company in Ubangi-Shari

The Company of the Upper Ubangi Sultanates (French: Compagnie des Sultanats du Haut-Oubangui) was a concessionary company in the colony of Ubangi-Shari (now the Central African Republic) between 1899 and 1927. It was founded by ten European shareholders and received from the French government a 140,000 km^{2} territory to administer and exploit.

Ernest Bouchard, one of the original shareholders, took possession of the territory from the colonial official, Henri Bobichon, on 22 August 1900 at Bangassou. The company engaged in the rubber and ivory trades, exacting labour from the natives. Rubber production took off immediately and grew rapidly. In 1901 it was 28,306 tons, by 1905 it had grown almost tenfold and in 1914 it was 426,239 tons. Ivory production was at 34,785 tons in 1901, but it remained relatively steady over the same interval. In 1927, the company was dissolved.

It was replaced by the New Company of the Upper Ubangi Sultanates (Société nouvelle des Sultanats du Haut-Oubangui), which had established a trading office at Bangui by 1935. Less profitable than its predecessor, its agent on the ground left Bangui in 1940 and its property came under the control of the Society of Colonial Enterprises (Société d'entreprises coloniales) for the duration of World War II (1939–45). In 1947, the failed Société nouvelle was dissolved.
