= Civic Forum (Central African Republic) =

- President: Timothée Malendoma
- Founded: 1991
- Headquarters: Bangui
- Ideology: Conservatism; Republicanism; Federalism

Civic Forum (French: Forum Civique, FC) is a political party in the Central African Republic led by Timothée Malendoma.

== History ==
Established in 1991, the party was originally a member of the Concentration of Democratic Forces alliance, but was suspended in August 1992 due to its participation in the "grand national debate". On 4 December 1992 its leader Malendoma was appointed Prime Minister, but he was later sacked by President André Kolingba on 26 February 1993.

In the 1993 general elections the party nominated Malendoma as its candidate for the presidency. Malendoma finished sixth out of eight candidates in the first round with 2% of the vote. In the National Assembly elections the party won a single seat.

In the next parliamentary elections in 1998 the Civic Forum was part of the Union of Forces for Peace (UFAP), which opposed President Ange-Félix Patassé. The party won a single seat, and UFAP gained a majority of 55 of the 109 seats in the National Assembly. However, the ruling Movement for the Liberation of the Central African People was able to form a government after the defection of a UFAP MP.
