= Central African National Liberation Movement =

The Central African National Liberation Movement (French: Mouvement Centrafricain de Libération Nationale, MCLN), was a political opposition movement in the Central African Republic led by Rodolphe Iddi Lala. The party had an armed wing, the Forces Armées de Libération Militaire (English: Armed Forces of Military Liberation).

== History ==
Lala was expelled from Abel Goumba's Ubangian Popular Front in 1980, and subsequently formed the MCLN on 30 December 1980,which failed to attract considerable support. On July 14, 1981 MCLN bombed a popular cinema in Bangui. Three people were killed and several others injured. MCLN took responsibility for the act and claimed that such attacks would only be stopped if French troops withdrew. The regime answered by banning MCLN and several other (more peaceful) opposition groups.

MCLN was supported by Libya. Claimed links to MCLN were often used by the regime to delegitimize the major opposition forces in the country. The party was banned on 18 July 1981.
