= Anne-Marie Goumba =

Central African politician

Central African representative to the Pan-African Parliament

National Assembly of the Central African Republic Member

Personal details
- Born: Anne-Marie Mbakondo; 9 October 1954 (age 70); Nyanza, Rwanda
- Political party: Patriotic Front for Progress
- Spouse: Abel Goumba
- Education: École Normale Supérieure, Université Catholique d'Afrique Centrale

Anne-Marie Goumba (born 9 October 1954), is a member of the National Assembly of the Central African Republic and of the Pan-African Parliament from the Central African Republic. She is the widow of long-time Central African politician Abel Goumba.

== Early life ==
Anne-Marie Mbakondo was born on 9 October 1954 in Nyanza, Rwanda. She first undertook higher education at the École Normale Supérieure in Save, Rwanda, before moving on to study at the Université Catholique d'Afrique Centrale. She subsequently undertook a teaching role as a professor at the Butare Faculty of Medicine between 1973 and 1977. While there, she met Abel Goumba, who was also a lecturer on public health issues, later marrying him.

== Political career ==
Her husband was a long-time Central African political reformer, who founded what eventually became the Patriotic Front for Progress party. She too supported the work of the FPP, and stood in the 2005 Central African general election and was elected as a deputy for Bangui's fifth district with 37.32 percent in the 8 May runoff. In the same election, her husband lost his seat. After being named to the National Assembly of the Central African Republic, she was named as a Central African representative to the Pan-African Parliament. In January 2015, she praised the peacekeeping efforts in Rwanda, saying that while she has lived in the Central African Republic for 30 years, she never forgets that she came from Rwanda. She is the coordinator of the non government organisation Les Flamboyants, which seeks to prevent violence against women and children.
