= Firmin Ngrébada =

Central African politician

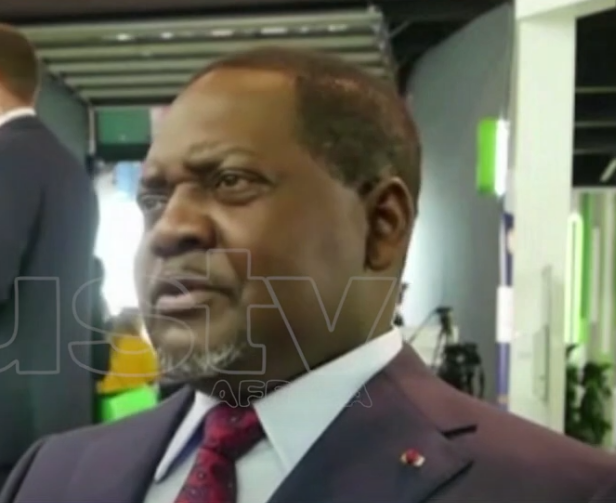

Prime Minister of the Central African Republic
- In office 25 February 2019 – 15 June 2021
- President: Faustin-Archange Touadéra
- Preceded by: Simplice Sarandji
- Succeeded by: Henri-Marie Dondra

Personal details
- Born: 24 May 1968 (age 58) Bangui, Central African Republic
- Party: United Hearts Movement
- Education: University of Bangui
- Profession: Politician, principal labor inspector

Firmin Ngrébada (born 24 May 1968) is a Central African politician who served as Prime Minister of the Central African Republic from 25 February 2019 to 15 June 2021. He was appointed after a peace deal was signed between the government and 14 armed groups to try to suppress violence in the ongoing civil war. He also led the Central African Republic's delegation in the negotiations of the peace deal.

== Political career ==
Firmin Ngrebada graduated in law in 1988, then he obtained a master's degree in public law in 1994, at the University of Bangui. He entered public service in October 1993, inspecting social and labor law.

Ngrébada served as Deputy Cabinet Director under Simplice Sarandji when Sarandji was Cabinet Director and Faustin-Archange Touadéra was Prime Minister. He went on to become the cabinet director of the Central African Republic, and chief of staff to the President. On 25 February 2019, Ngrébada was sworn in as Prime Minister.

On 10 June 2021, Ngrébada and his entire cabinet resigned following the withdrawal of 160 French soldiers from the country earlier that week. The French government suspended the soldiers after alleging that the current government was complicit in Russian propaganda, especially Ngrébada. In addition, they accused the government of failing to fight anti-French disinformation and of harsh treatment against the opposition.

He also maintained ties with the Wagner Group, a Russian private military company. However, he later stated in 2023 that he was not the "Russians' man" and said it was absurd accusations. In addition, upon the outbreak of the Russian invasion of Ukraine, he opposed FACA soldiers getting involved in the war and said it does not involve them.

Political offices
Preceded by Simplice Sarandji	Prime Minister of the Central African Republic; 2019–2021	Succeeded by Henri-Marie Dondra
