= Simplice Sarandji =

Central African politician (born 1955)

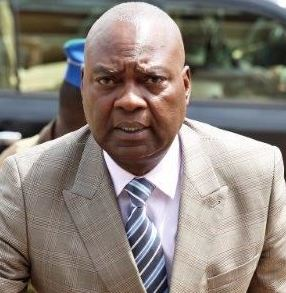
- Sarandji in 2016

President of the National Assembly of the Central African Republic
- Incumbent
- Assumed office 5 May 2021
- Preceded by: Laurent Ngon Baba

Prime Minister of the Central African Republic
- In office 2 April 2016 – 27 February 2019
- President: Faustin-Archange Touadéra
- Preceded by: Mahamat Kamoun
- Succeeded by: Firmin Ngrébada

Personal details
- Born: 4 April 1955 (age 71) Baoro, Ubangi-Shari (now Central African Republic)
- Party: Independent
- Education: Bordeaux Montaigne University

Simplice Sarandji (born 4 April 1955) is a Central African politician who has served as the president of the National Assembly of the Central African Republic since 5 May 2021. He previously served as the prime minister of the Central African Republic from 2016 to 2019. He also previously acted as the chief of staff for Prime Minister Faustin-Archange Touadera, and the campaign manager during Touadera's successful presidential campaign. Prior to his political career, he lectured in geography at the University of Bangui.

== Educational career ==
Simplice Sarandji holds a Doctor of Philosophy degree in geography from Michel de Montaigne University Bordeaux 3, and subsequently taught the subject for four years at the University of Bangui, where he also became dean.

== Political career ==
Previously, Sarandji served as chief of staff for Faustin-Archange Touadera while the latter served as Prime Minister, for five years between 2008 and 2013. The two were familiar with each other from when they were each students. Sarandji also acted as Touadera's campaign director during the December 2015–February 2016 presidential election. After Touadera took office as president, he appointed Sarandji as prime minister on 2 April 2016.

He named his first cabinet on 12 April, consisting of 23 members including Jean-Serge Bokassa, Charles Armel Doubane and Joseph Yakete, each of whom had run against Touadera for president. Sarandji elected not to include any members from the Christian and Muslim militias behind the violence in the 2013 coup. As prime minister, his security is provided by a Rwanda National Police Protection Support Unit which is deployed to the Central African Republic as part of the United Nations stabilization mission. He subsequently praised the Rwandan peacekeepers for introducing a form of community work in Rwanda called Umuganda into the Central Africa Republic.

Political offices
Preceded by Mahamat Kamoun	Prime Minister of the Central African Republic; 2016–2019	Succeeded by Firmin Ngrébada
Preceded by Laurent Ngon Baba	President of the National Assembly of the Central African Republic; 2021–present	Incumbent
