= The One Tower =

General information
- Status: Completed
- Type: Office
- Location: Dubai, United Arab Emirates
- Construction started: 2008
- Opening: 2015

Height
- Roof: 209 metres (686 ft)

Technical details
- Floor count: 47

Design and construction
- Architect: Dewan Architects
- Developer: RM Real Estate Development

The One Tower is a 47-floor tower in Al Barsha Heights, Dubai, United Arab Emirates. It is located along Sheikh Zayed Road and is directly connected to Dubai Internet City Metro Station through Podium 1 of the building.
