= Insurance Market (Dubai Metro) =

Metro station in Dubai, United Arab Emirates

InsuranceMarket سوق التأمين

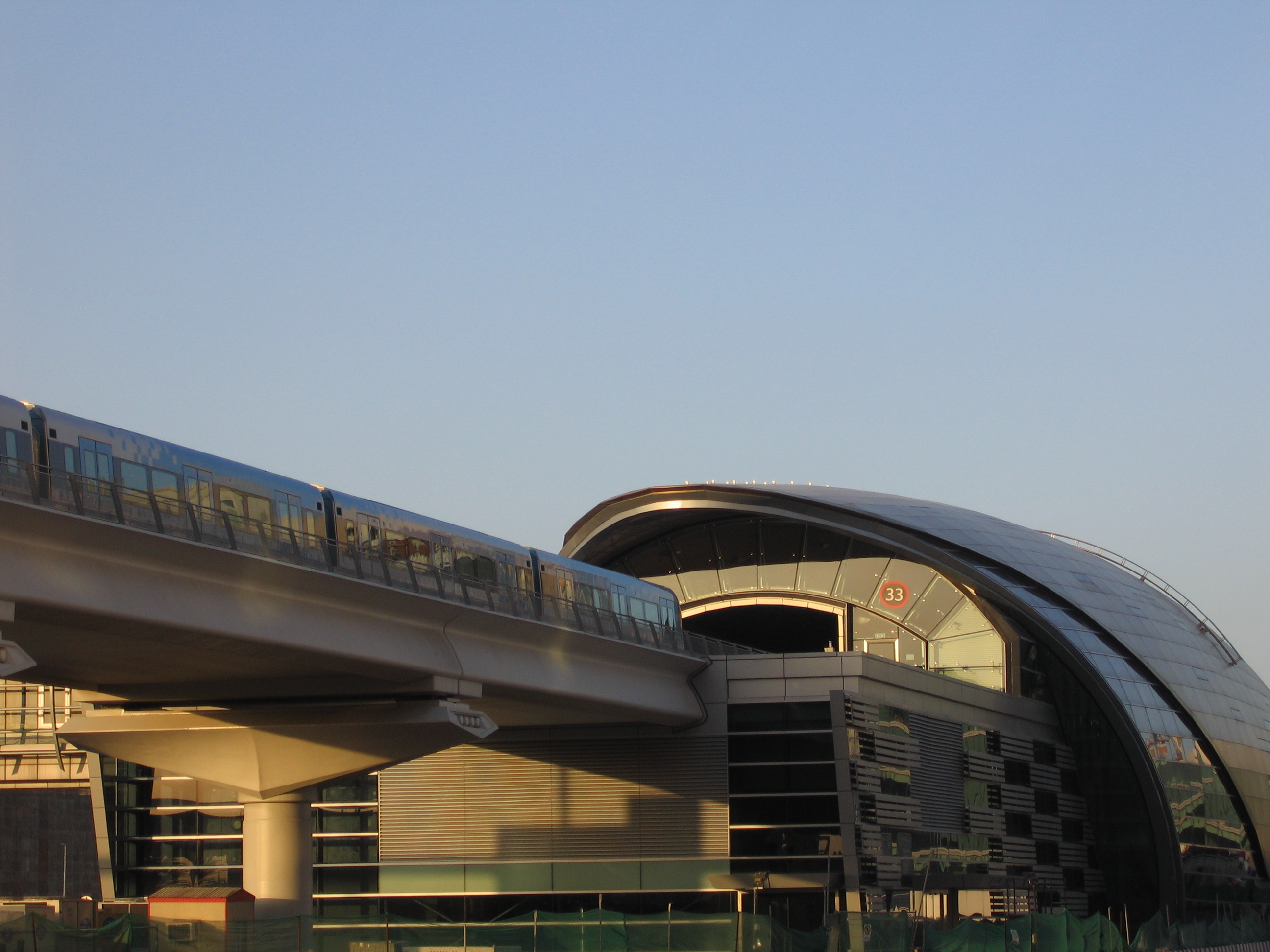

General information
- Location: Dubai; United Arab Emirates
- Coordinates: 25.11477°N 55.19089°E
- Line: Red Line
- Platforms: 2 side platforms
- Tracks: 2

Construction
- Accessible: yes

Other information
- Station code: 33

History
- Opened: October 15, 2010
- Former names: Sharaf DG, Mashreq

Services
Preceding station	Dubai Metro	Following station
Dubai Internet City towards Expo 2020 or Life Pharmacy	Red Line	Mall of the Emirates towards Centrepoint
Location

InsuranceMarket (formerly Sharaf DG and Mashreq) is a rapid transit station on the Red Line of the Dubai Metro in Dubai, UAE. It is located on Sheikh Zayed Road, serving the areas of Al Barsha and Al Sufouh.

== History ==
The station opened on 15 October 2010.

On 18 May 2020, the station was named Sharaf DG. Subsequently, Al Fahidi station was renamed to Sharaf DG on 24 November 2020.

The station was closed from 16 April 2024 to 18 May 2024 due to damage sustained during the 2024 United Arab Emirates floods.

On September 5, 2024, the station was renamed to InsuranceMarket after the Dubai-based company InsuranceMarket.ae.

== Station layout ==
The station has two side platforms and two tracks.

G	Street level	Exit/Entrance
L1	Concourse	Automatic Fare Collection gates, station agent, crossover
L2	Side platform | Doors will open on the right
L2	Platform 2 Southbound	Towards ← Life Pharmacy / Expo 2020; Next Station: Dubai Internet City
L2	Platform 1 Northbound	Towards → Centrepoint; Next Station: Mall of the Emirates
L2	Side platform | Doors will open on the right
