= Kolingba =

Kolingba is a surname. Notable people with the surname include:

- André Kolingba (1936 – 2010), 4th president of the Central African Republic
- Désiré Kolingba (1956 – 2021), Central African politician
