= National Treasury School =

The National Treasury School, or École nationale du Trésor public, was the French government's school for training civil servants, and future civil servants, for competitive entry into finance posts in the French civil service.

The school had three bases, as follows:-

- Noisiel (Seine-et-Marne), headquarters and training of future inspectors (Category A);
- Lyon (Rhône), training of financial controllers (Category B);
- Noisy-le-Grand (Seine-Saint-Denis), for administrative staff (Category C).

The French government closed the school and replaced it with the new formed École nationale des finances publiques (ENFiP) in August 2010.
