= Central African Democratic Union =

Political party in the Central African Republic

Central African Democratic Union Union Démocratique Centrafricaine
- Abbreviation: UDC
- Founder: David Dacko
- Founded: 1 March 1980 (45 years, 166 days)
- Dissolved: 2 September 1981 (43 years, 346 days)
- Headquarters: Bangui, Central African Republic
- Ideology: African nationalism Republicanism

The Central African Democratic Union (French: Union Démocratique Centrafricaine, UDC) was a political party in the Central African Republic.

== History ==
The UDC was established by David Dacko in March 1980 at a congress. Dacko claimed that the UDC was the continuation of Movement for the Social Evolution of Black Africa (MESAN). The party was banned on 2 September 1981, following the 1981 Central African Republic coup d'état.

== Electoral history ==
=== Presidential elections ===
Election	Party candidate	Votes	Percentage	Result
1981	David Dacko	374,027	51.10%	Elected ✓
