= Patriotic Front for Progress =

Political party in the Central African Republic

Patriotic Front for Progress Front Patriotique pour le Progrès
- President: Alexandre Goumba
- Founded: 1991
- Headquarters: Bangui
- Ideology: Democratic socialism Social democracy
- Political position: Centre-left
- International affiliation: Socialist International (Observer)

The Patriotic Front for Progress (French: Front Patriotique pour le Progrès, FPP) is a political party in the Central African Republic. It is an observer member of the Socialist International.

== History ==
The FPP was officially established in 1991, being created from the Oubanguien Patriotic Front which was founded in exile in 1972. It won seven seats in the National Assembly in the 1993 general elections, emerging as the joint third-largest party. Its presidential candidate Abel Goumba received 21.7% of the vote in the first round, progressing to the second round where he was defeated by Ange-Félix Patassé by a margin of 53–47%. The party won seven seats again in the 1998 parliamentary elections. In the presidential elections the following year the party nominated Gouma again; he finished fourth out of ten candidates with 7% of the vote.

In 2002, the party suspended its participation in the opposition coalition. In the 2005 general elections Goumba was the party's presidential candidate again, receiving only 2.5% of the vote and finishing sixth out of eleven candidates. In the parliamentary elections, the FPP was reduced to just two seats. Goumba ran for a seat in the National Assembly but was defeated. However, his wife Anne-Marie won a seat.

Goumba's son Alexandre was elected by acclamation to succeed him as President of the FPP on 5 March 2006 at an extraordinary general assembly of the party. However, this was followed by an internal dispute; ultimately the Council of State recognized the legitimacy of Alexandre Goumba's election on 16 May 2008, and he was invested as FPP President on 4 October 2008.

In 2010 the party joined the Presidential Majority alliance in preparation for the 2011 general elections. Although it nominated 20 candidates, it failed to win a seat.
