= Abel Goumba =

Central African politician (1926–2009)

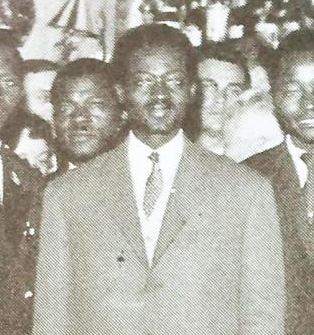
- Goumba c. 1960

2nd Vice President of the Central African Republic
- In office 12 December 2003 – 15 March 2005
- President: François Bozizé
- Preceded by: Henri Maïdou (1980)
- Succeeded by: Post abolished

Prime Minister of the Central African Republic
- In office 15 March 2003 – 11 December 2003
- President: François Bozizé
- Preceded by: Martin Ziguélé
- Succeeded by: Célestin Gaombalet

Acting Prime Minister of Ubangi-Shari
- In office 30 March 1959 – 30 April 1959
- Preceded by: Barthélemy Boganda
- Succeeded by: David Dacko

Personal details
- Born: Abel Nguéndé Goumba; 18 September 1926 Grimari, Ubangi-Uaka, Ubangi-Shari (present-day Ouaka, Central African Republic)
- Died: 11 May 2009 (aged 82) Bangui, Central African Republic
- Party: Patriotic Front for Progress (from 1972) (Note: Known as the Oubanguien Patriotic Front until 1991)
- Other political affiliations: MESAN (until 1960)
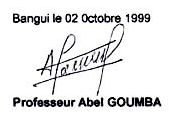
- Signature

Abel Nguéndé Goumba (French pronunciation: [abɛl gumba]; 18 September 1926 – 11 May 2009) was a Central African politician. During the late 1950s, he headed the government in the period prior to independence from France, and following independence he was an unsuccessful candidate for President of the Central African Republic four times (1981, 1993, 1999, and 2005). Goumba, who was President of the Patriotic Front for Progress (FPP) political party, served under President François Bozizé as Prime Minister from March 2003 to December 2003 and then as Vice President of the Central African Republic from December 2003 to March 2005. Subsequently, he was appointed to the official post of Ombudsman.

== Early life ==
He was born in 1926 in Grimari, Ouaka Prefecture in the Oubangi-Chari French colony, which is now the Central African Republic. He was a qualified medical doctor and member of the medical faculty in Bangui.

== Entry into politics and exile (1957-1981) ==
While the country was still a French colony, Goumba was Vice-President of the Government Council from May 1957 to July 1958, President of the Government Council from July to December 1958, and was briefly Prime Minister in an acting capacity in April 1959, following the death of Barthélemy Boganda in a plane crash. However, Goumba was seen as too nationalistic and anti-French, which led France to promote their loyal ally David Dacko instead. Dacko won the ensuing power struggle in 1959 and dismissed Goumba as Minister of Finance; he went on to become the independent country's first president.

In 1960, Goumba and Pierre-Faustin Maleombho went on to found a small opposition party, the Mouvement d'évolution démocratique de l'Afrique centrale (MEDAC). When MEDAC won substantial support in by-elections, Dacko declared the party illegal and arrested its leadership. Goumba, along with two close associates, was sentenced to life imprisonment in February 1962 by the Supreme Court, which still consisted entirely of French magistrates. Goumba managed to go in exile in France, where he completed his medical studies. He worked for the World Health Organization in Rwanda and then Benin during the 1970s; while in Rwanda, he met his wife, Anne-Marie, who was then a professor at the Butare Faculty of Medicine. Maleombho, the co-founder of the MEDAC, was executed by the Bokassa regime in 1976.

== Dacko and Kolingba era (1981-1993) ==
At the time of the 1979 French coup which deposed military dictator Bokassa, Goumba was still in exile. However, he had the backing of a new, émigré opposition party behind him, the Front patriotique oubanguien, which he had founded in 1972. When handpicking a successor to Bokassa, France immediately discarded Goumba due to his perceived Marxist ideas and his revolutionary past. Instead, the French installed Dacko again. When voices in the CAR were raised for the return of Goumba, the French right-wing press launched a campaign against him, painting him as an agent of the Soviet Union. Goumba and the Front patriotique reacted by denouncing French interference in Central African politics and demanding the departure of French troops.

After his 1981 return to the Central African Republic, Goumba was again occasionally arrested for political activity. He feuded with all of Central African Republic's presidents until 2003 and was declared by them to be a national traitor. In the 1981 election, his Front patriotique won a mere 1,44% of the vote. The Kolingba regime, which came into power a few months later by overthrowing Dacko in the 1981 coup, kept Goumba and other political opponents under close surveillance and excluded them from formal politics.

Goumba swiftly returned to politics with the comeback of electoral democracy in the early '90s. The Front patriotique was relaunched as the Patriotic Front for Progress (FPP) in 1991.

== Patassé era (1993-2003) ==
In the 1993 presidential election Goumba achieved his best result, coming in second place but being defeated by Ange-Félix Patassé in a run-off, in which Goumba took 46,51% of the vote. Reminiscing about this era, American ambassador Robert Gribbin described Goumba as "more of a '60s style revolutionary than anyone else" in the political landscape at the time. He also had a reputation for honesty and integrity, and stressed the importance of governing without corruption.

In the 1999 election he did poorly by comparison, taking only 6,56% of the vote and placing fourth, behind Patassé, Kolingba and Dacko.

== Bozizé era (2003-2006) ==
After François Bozizé seized power on 15 March 2003, ousting Patassé, he appointed Goumba as Prime Minister on 23 March. His government was formed on 31 March 2003; in its composition it was viewed as a compromise between Bozizé and Goumba, with a number of military allies and relatives of Bozizé receiving key posts while other posts went to associates and allies of various political leaders and to independent figures regarded as competent. Goumba kept the portfolio of Minister of Finance himself. The National Transitional Council (CNT) rejected Goumba's proposed programme of general policy on 5 November 2003, saying that the government's objectives, along with the methods of implementing those objectives, were not sufficiently defined in the programme. He had planned to submit a revised programme on 12 December 2003, but on 11 December, Bozizé dismissed him as Prime Minister. On the next day Célestin Gaombalet was named to replace him; Goumba was appointed as Vice-President instead.

He was a presidential candidate for the fourth time in the 2005 election. Goumba was not expected to win; he received sixth place and 2.51% of the vote. He was one of the five candidates initially approved by the transitional constitutional court on 30 December 2004; seven other candidates were excluded, although six of them were later allowed to run.

On 14 March 2005, the day after the election, members of the Collective of Political Parties of the Opposition (CPPO), including Goumba, signed a petition in which they alleged that fraud had occurred. On 15 March, before the election results became available, Bozizé dismissed Goumba from the Vice-Presidency and the position was abolished. According to presidential spokesman Alain-George Ngatoua, this was because the constitution adopted in December 2004 did not provide for a Vice-President, and the dismissal was unrelated to the quality of Goumba's work; Ngatoua said that Bozizé thanked Goumba for facilitating the transitional process through his "wisdom and courage". Goumba expressed disgust at the manner of his dismissal; he said that he had received no notification of the dismissal and found out about it when it was reported on state radio. Goumba's view was that transitional institutions, including the Vice-Presidency, were supposed to be maintained until the installation of an elected government.

Goumba ran for a seat from Kouango in the 2005 parliamentary election, held concurrently with the presidential election, but was defeated; his wife Anne-Marie won a seat, however.

== Retirement and death ==
Goumba's son Alexandre was elected to succeed him as president of the FPP on 5 March 2006, after the elder Goumba was appointed to the official post of Ombudsman. As Ombudsman, he called for the government to negotiate with a rebel group after it captured Birao on 30 October 2006.

He presented the first volume of his memoirs, covering the period from 1956 to 1959, on 14 January 2007.

Goumba died at age 82 on 11 May 2009 at a clinic in Bangui after being taken to hospital the previous evening.

Political offices
Preceded by Barthélemy Boganda	Prime Minister of Ubangi-Shari; Acting; 1959	Succeeded by David Dacko
Preceded by Martin Ziguélé	Prime Minister of the Central African Republic; 2003	Succeeded by Célestin Gaombalet
Vacant Title last held by Henri Maïdou	Vice President of the Central African Republic; 2003–2005	Position abolished
