= Gbanzili language =

Ubangian language of the CAR and DR Congo

Gbanziri
- Native to: Central African Republic, Democratic Republic of the Congo
- Native speakers: (21,000 cited 1986–1996)
- Language family: Ubangian: Sere–Mba; Ngbaka; Western; Gbanziri

Language codes
- ISO 639-3: Either: gbg – Gbanziri bkg – Buraka
- Glottolog: gban1257
- ELP: Gbanziri

Gbanziri (Gbanzili) is a Ubangian language of the Central African Republic and Democratic Republic of the Congo.
