= Ubangi-Shari =

1903–1960 French colony in Central Africa

Coordinates: 7°N 20°E

Ubangi-Shari Oubangui-Chari (French)
- 1903–1960
- Flag Coat of arms (1958–1960)
- Anthem: "La Marseillaise"
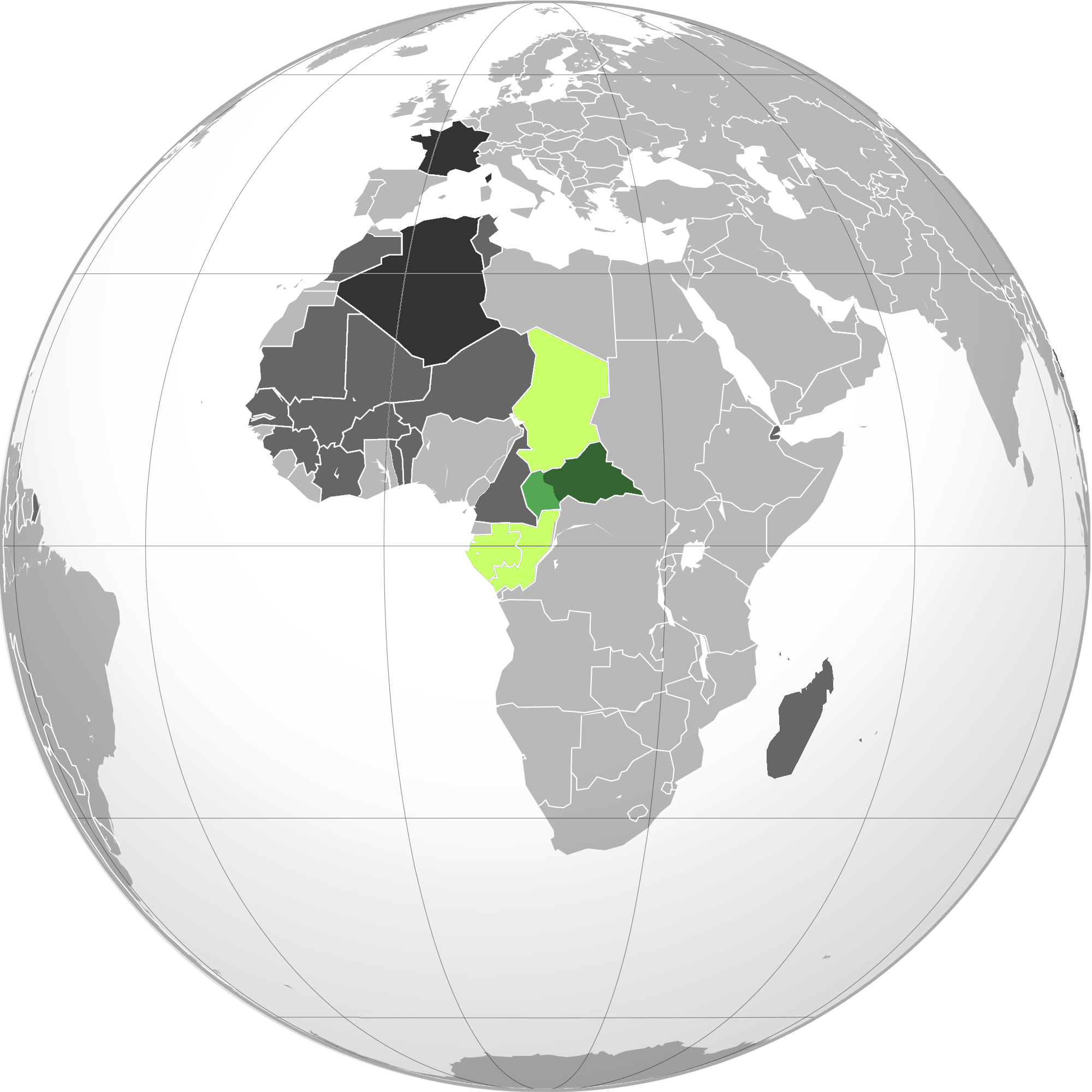
- Before 1916; After 1916; French Equatorial Africa; French possessions; French Republic
- Status: Colony of France
- Capital: Abiras (1903–1906); Possel (1906); Bangui (1906–1958)
- Official language: French
- Commonly spoken: Sango
- Demonym: Ubangi-Sharian
- Commissioner General
  - 1903: Charles Noufflard
  - 1958–1960: Yvon Bourges
- Prime Minister
  - 1958–1959: Barthélemy Boganda
  - 1959: Abel Goumba
  - 1959–1960: David Dacko

Establishment
  - Established: 29 December 1903
  - French Equatorial Africa: 15 January 1910
  - French colony: 12 April 1916
  - French Equatorial Africa: 30 June 1934
  - Overseas territory: 31 December 1937
  - Autonomy as CAR: 1 December 1958
  - Independence: 13 August 1960
- Currency: FEA franc; CFA franc
Preceded by	Succeeded by
French Congo	Central African Republic
- Today part of: CAR

Ubangi-Shari (French: Oubangui-Chari) was a French colony in central Africa, a part of French Equatorial Africa. It was named after the Ubangi and Chari rivers along which it was colonised.

Established on 29 December 1903 from the Upper Ubangi (Haut-Oubangui) and Upper Shari (Haut-Chari) territories of the French Congo, it was renamed the Central African Republic (CAR) on 1 December 1958, and gained independence on 13 August 1960.

== History ==
French activity in the area began in 1889 with the establishment of the outpost Bangi at the head of navigation on the Ubangi.

The Upper Ubangi was established as part of the French Congo on 9 December 1891. Despite a France-Congo Free State convention establishing a border around the 4th parallel, the area was contested from 1892 to 1895 with the Congo Free State, which claimed the region as its territory of Ubangi-Bomu (Oubangui-Bomou). The Upper Ubangi was a separate colony from 13 July 1894 until 10 December 1899, at which time it was folded back into the French Congo. The Upper Shari region was established as part of the French Congo on 5 September 1900. That same year the Company of the Upper Ubangi Sultanates took over 140,000 km^{2} of Upper Ubangi as a concession.

The territories were united as the separate colony of Ubangi-Shari on 29 December 1903, following the French defeat of Abbas II of Egypt, who had claimed the area. On 11 February 1906, this colony merged with the French settlements around Lake Chad and became the Ubangi-Shari territory of Ubangi-Shari-Chad (Oubangui-Chari-Tchad). In 1909, it received the administration over the sultanates of Zemio and Rafai from the Belgian Congo.

On 15 January 1910, this administration was merged with French Congo and Gabon as the Ubangi-Shari area of French Equatorial Africa (FEA). On 12 April 1916, it again became the separate colony of Ubangi-Shari, but in 1920 lost the territory around Lake Chad, and on 30 June 1934, was again folded into FEA. As a part of FEA, it was declared an overseas territory on 31 December 1937.

Between 1915 and 1931, stamps were overprinted for use in Ubangi-Shari, and later specially printed for the colony.

During World War II, it remained loyal to Vichy France from 16 June to 29 August 1940, before being taken by the Free French. It was granted autonomy as the Central African Republic on 1 December 1958, and independence under the same name on 13 August 1960.

=== Concession systems and atrocities ===
Ubangi-Shari had a similar concession system as the Congo Free State and similar atrocities were also committed there. French author and Nobel laureate André Gide travelled to Ubangi-Shari and was told by inhabitants about atrocities including mutilations, dismemberments, executions, the burning of children, and villagers being forcibly bound to large beams and made to walk until dropping from exhaustion and thirst.

The book "Travels to Congo" by Gide, published in 1927 describes the horrors of the concession companies in French Equatorial Africa. The book had an important impact on the anti-colonialist movement in France. The number of victims under the French concession system in Ubangi-Shari and other parts of French Equatorial Africa remains unknown.

== See also ==
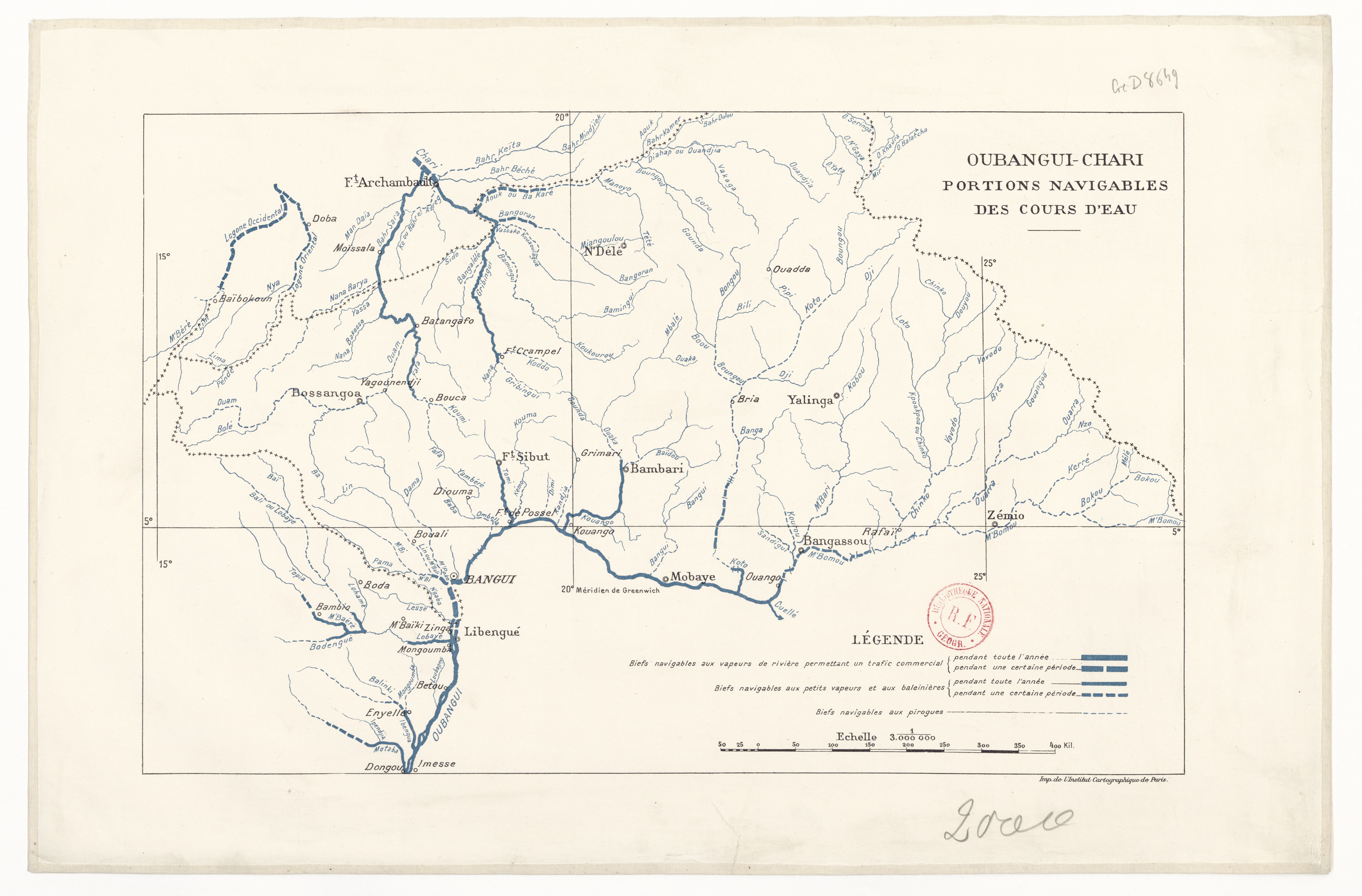
Rivers and navigable waterways of Ubangi-Shari, 1931

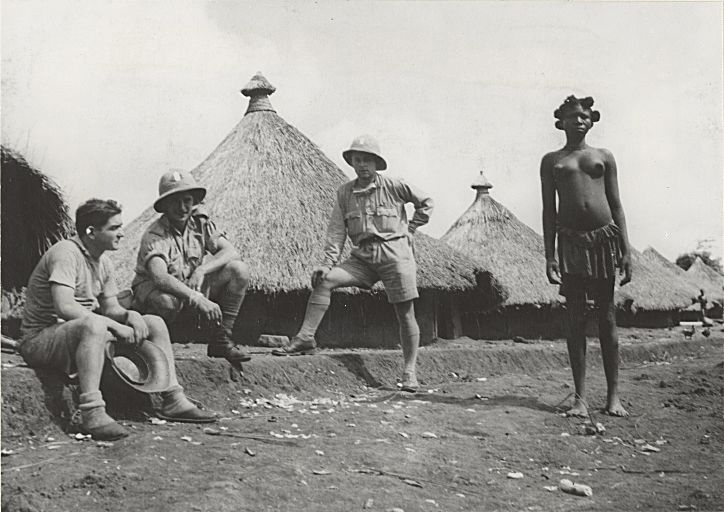
Soldiers of the Forces Françaises Libres near Bangui, 1940

- Postage stamps and postal history of Ubangi-Shari
