= Alphonse Yokadouma =

Member of National Assembly
- In office 30 April 1959 – 1 January 1966

Member of Territorial Assembly
- In office 1952–1957

Personal details
- Born: 25 March 1918 Bilolo, Ubangi-Shari (now the present-day Central African Republic)
- Died: Unknown Unknown
- Party: MESAN

Alphonse Yokadouma (25 March 1918 - ?) was a Central African politician and clerk who served as a member of National Assembly (1959–1966).

== Biography ==
Belonging to Mpiemu, Yokadouma was born on 25 March 1918 in Bilolo to Mongonga and Nabayanga. In 1947, he worked as a writer-interpreter in the Urban Agglomeration office. He then switched jobs to clerk in the finance service of French Equatorial Africa (FEA) in Bangui in an unknown year. In 1949, he reportedly served as an assistant clerk and was promoted to the 3rd class on 15 March. While serving as assistant clerk 3rd class, the government appointed him as member of Administrative Commission for the revision of electoral rolls of Mixed Commune of Bangui on 18 January 1951. In July 1951, he received another job promotion to 2nd class. On 1 July 1956, his position as assistant clerk was elevated to principal level with the rank of 1st echelon. As a principal assistant clerk of 1st echelon, he was placed in Berbérati.

Yokadouma then joined MESAN party in an unknown year and became the party's treasurer. He participated in the 1952 election as a MESAN candidate representing Haute-Sangha and won a seat in the Territorial Assembly. In the 1957 election, he was reelected as a member of the territorial assembly, causing him to take leave on his clerk job on 27 June 1957. Although he took leave, his civil service status and pension rights were retained. In the 1959 election, he was elected as a member of the National Assembly. He was then reelected as MP in the 1964 election, serving it until 1 January 1966.

As a member of the National Assembly, Yokadouma became the Vice President of the Economic Development and Agriculture Committee from 1959 to 1966. On 30 December 1960, the government appointed him as the assembly's representative to the Inter-Parliamentary Consulting Senate of the Communauté, serving that position until 1961. While serving as an MP, he was also tasked as the Mayor of Bilolo rural municipality and as the MESAN party's managing committee.

Yokadouma died on an unknown date.

== Awards ==
- , Officer Order of Central African Merit.
- Knight Agricultural Merit.

== Bibliography ==
- Bradshaw, Richard; Rius, Juan Fandos (2016). Historical Dictionary of the Central African Republic (Historical Dictionaries of Africa). Lanham: Rowman & Littlefield.
