= Ibrahim Tello =

Prefect of Haut-Mbomou
- In office 18 August 1973 – 20 October 1973
- President: Jean-Bédel Bokassa
- Preceded by: Adolphe Kpefio
- Succeeded by: Jérôme Kossi

Member of National Assembly
- In office 30 April 1959 – 30 April 1964

Member of Representative Council
- In office 1946–1952
- Constituency: Bangassou

Personal details
- Born: 19 October 1918 Bangassou, Ubangi-Shari (now the present-day Central African Republic)
- Party: MSA; MESAN

Joseph Ibrahim Tello (19 October 1918 - ?) was a Central African politician and civil servant who served as a member of National Assembly (1959–1964) and Prefect of Haut-Mbomou (1973).

== Biography ==
Belonging to Yakoma, Tello was born on 19 October 1918 in Bangassou to Abdoulaye Tello and Guengba. After completing primary school education, he joined the French Equatorial Africa (FEA) public service, working as a clerk. Later, he switched his profession to an interpreter. As a civil servant, he was assigned to Bouar serving at its government. When he lived in Bouar, he joined MSA and became the leader of the party's local branch.

In the 1946 election, Tello ran as a candidate for the Representative Council of Ubangi economic and social action (AESO), representing the Bangassou district, and was elected for a five-year term. In 1947, he joined the Ubangi Union (UO) party. While serving as a member of the Representative Council, he earned a diploma in secretarial studies from the Training and Advancement Center for Oubangui civil servants with a grade "quite good" on 14 January 1949 and served as a secretary of the council's bureau.

Tello left UO in 1952 and ran unsuccessfully as a candidate of MSA on 1952 election. He ran in the 1957 election as a candidate of the same party five years earlier and failed to be elected, leading him to join MESAN.

Upon the death of Barthélemy Boganda in April 1959, Tello was one of the MESAN members who endorsed David Dacko as president. He ran again in the 1959 election as a candidate of MESAN, which led to his resignation as a clerk, with the last rank of 2nd echelon. In the election, he was elected as a member of the National Assembly for five terms. He was inaugurated as an MP on 30 April 1959. While serving as a member of the National Assembly, Tello held several positions, such as the president of the MESAN parliamentary group, parliament representative to the National Development Bank, Central Bank of Equatorial African States and Cameroon, Civil society for the study of the Bangui railway in Chad, and Economic and Social Council (from 9 October 1962 to 1964).

After resigning from parliament, Tello became the director of administrative and communal affairs of the Ministry of Internal Affairs in 1965. Later, he served as a Director of the Penitentiary. On 18 August 1973, he was appointed Prefect of Haut-Mbomou, serving that position until 20 October. Upon stepping down as a prefect, he worked as an entrepreneur in the transportation sector. During Kolingba's administration, he worked as an adviser to the Chamber of Commerce in Bangui.

Tello died in an unknown year. He was the brother-in-law of Étienne Ngounio.

== Awards ==
- Order of the Black Star - 21 September 1951.
- , Officer Order of Central African Merit - 9 November 1962.

== Bibliography ==
- Bradshaw, Richard; Rius, Juan Fandos (2016). Historical Dictionary of the Central African Republic (Historical Dictionaries of Africa). Lanham: Rowman & Littlefield.
