= Gabriel Pounaba =

Chief of Bougouyo Canton
- In office 1 June 1947 – 11 August 1969

Member of National Assembly
- In office 30 April 1959 – 1 January 1966
- President: David Dacko

Personal details
- Born: 12 January 1905 Ippy, Ubangi-Shari (now the present-day Central African Republic)
- Died: 11 April 1969 (aged 64) Yengou, Ouaka, Central African Republic
- Party: SFIO; RPF; MESAN

Gabriel Pounaba (12 January 1905 - 11 April 1969) was a Central African politician who served as Chief of Bougouyo Canton (1947-1969) and Member of National Assembly (1959-1966).

== Biography ==
Belonging to Banda of Linda, Pounaba was born in Ippy on 12 January 1905. He attended a French-language school and served as a village chief of Bougouyo after graduating. On 28 August 1937, he was appointed as a member of the Ouaka Indigenous Notables Council. In January 1939, he became an adviser on Ippy Court. While serving as a court adviser, he once challenged Chief Honoré Yetomané’s leadership in the 1940s. The French colonial government granted him évolué status on 29 August 1945, when he was a farmer and village chief.

Pounaba was nominated as a Socialist-SFIO candidate for a seat on the Ubangi-Shari Representative Council in the 1946 election, representing the Fort-Sibut constituency. However, he failed to win a seat at the council, causing him to leave the Socialist Party and join Rally of the French People (RPF). He then became the RPF's spokesperson in Ouaka after the arrival of RPF member government officials in the region and served as Chief of Bougouyo Canton (1947-1969). Later, he left RPF and joined MESAN party. On 21 February 1950, the Ubangi-Shari government created an administrative commission for the revision of electoral lists in each Ouaka-Kotto region, and Pounaba was appointed as a member of the body for the District of Ippy. In the same month, he became the President of Ippy Customary Courts.

Pounaba was named as a candidate of Territorial Assembly representing Ouaka in the 1952 election. He was elected as a member of the National Assembly representing the 3rd constituency on the 1959 election. He officially became a member of the National Assembly on 30 August 1959. While serving as an MP, he also served on the managing committee of the Central African Order of Merit on 7 July 1959.

In the 1964, Pounaba was reelected as a member of the National Assembly. As a member of parliament, he was granted a license to operate a rough diamond and gold purchasing center in Ippy on 13 September 1965 and was appointed as a member of Chamber of Agriculture on 2 December 1964. After the Saint-Sylvestre coup d'état, Bokassa dissolved the parliament, ending Pounaba's career in parliament. On 2 February 1967, Bokassa revoked Pounaba's license to purchase rough diamonds and gold. He died on 11 April 1969 in Yengou.

== Personal life ==
Pounaba owned land of 9.5 hectare land in Bougouyou and 1500 m2 in Ippy.

== Awards ==
- , Knight Order of the Black Star - 16 February 1944.
- Order of the Black Star - 21 September 1951.
- , Commander Order of Central African Merit - 1 December 1959.
- Knight Academic of Palms - 26 June 1964.

== Bibliography ==
- Bradshaw, Richard; Rius, Juan Fandos (2016). Historical Dictionary of the Central African Republic (Historical Dictionaries of Africa). Lanham: Rowman & Littlefield.
