= Thomas Lemotomo =

Member of National Assembly
- In office 30 April 1959 – 1 January 1966

Member of Territorial Assembly
- In office 1956–1959
- Preceded by: Jonas Ouanefio

Personal details
- Born: 1 January 1916 Daouli, Bossangoa, Ubangi-Shari (now the present-day Central African Republic)
- Died: Unknown Unknown
- Party: MESAN

Thomas Lemotomo (1 January 1916 - ?) was a Central African veterinary assistant and politician who served as a Member of the Territorial Assembly (1956–1957) and the National Assembly (1959–1966).

== Biography ==
Lemotomo was born in Daouli, Bossangoa on 1 January 1916 to a couple of Dedemo (father) and Bane (mother). On 28 February 1938, he became a veterinary assistant of the Zootechnical and Epizootic Services of French Equatorial Africa (A.E.F.) with probationary status. In March 1938, he was placed at Bouar. On 18 August, he earned the rank of 5th-Class Probationary Veterinary Assistant.

Lemotomo rank's was promoted to 4th class on 1 July 1941. Three years later, on 14 August, his rank as a veterinary assistant was elevated to third class. In April 1946, he was transferred to Bangui, where he served until 20 September 1947. While working as a veterinary assistant in Bangui, he joined MESAN party.

Within the MESAN party, he was placed as the technical adviser and deputy general treasurer. On 26 August 1956, Lemotomo was elected as a member of the Territorial Assembly, replacing Jonas Ouanefio, who resigned as councilor on 5 May. In the 1957 election, he was elected as a member of the territorial assembly. When he served as a member of the territorial assembly, he was designated as a member of the Commission for the Study and Settlement of Customary Rights in the Proposed Extension of the Nana-Barya Wildlife Reserve, together with Julien Mandaba.

Lemotomo then participated in the 1959 election and secured a seat in the National Assembly. In the 1964 election, he was reelected as an MP on 15 March. He stepped down as an MP on 1 January 1966. During his tenure as a member of the National Assembly, Dacko appointed him as a member of the constitutional council.

Lemotomo died on an unknown date.

== Award ==
- , Officer Order of Central African Merit - 9 November 1962.

== Bibliography ==
- Bradshaw, Richard; Rius, Juan Fandos (2016). Historical Dictionary of the Central African Republic (Historical Dictionaries of Africa). Lanham: Rowman & Littlefield.
