= Robert Sama =

Robert Sama was a politician from the Central African Republic.

He was born in Batangofa on June 25, 1925. He was a plantation owner. He was elected to the Oubangui-Chari Territorial Assembly in the 1957 election, standing as a Movement for the Social Evolution of Black Africa (MESAN) candidate in Ouham.

He was elected to the Legislative Assembly (which later became the National Assembly) in the 1959 Central African parliamentary election, standing as a MESAN candidate in the Second Constituency. On April 5, 1959 he was elected vice president of the Legislative Assembly. He chaired the Commission on the Interior. Member of the management committee of the cotton price stabilization fund, as representative of the under the National Assembly. He was appointed mayor of his hometown Batangafo. He headed the Coopécob cooperative in Batangafo. Sama was re-elected to the National Assembly in the 1964 Central African parliamentary election, elected from Batangafo constituency. His parliamentary mandate ended on January 1, 1966.

He took part in the effort to revive the MESAN party in the early 1990s. Sama was a recipient of the title of Officer of the Order of Central African Merit, Knight of the Order of Agricultural Merit and Commander of the National Order of Liberia.
