= Raoul Abatchou =

Central African politician

Member of National Assembly
- In office 1964 – 1 January 1966
- Constituency: Haute-Kotto

Personal details
- Born: 26 June 1926 Mbihi, Ubangi-Shari (now the present-day Central African Republic)
- Died: 28 April 1968 (aged 41) Bangui, Central African Republic
- Party: MESAN
- Children: Justine Veronique Abatchou
- Occupation: Politician

Raoul Joseph Abatchou (26 July 1926 - 28 April 1968) was a Central African politician and mining operator from Haute-Kotto.

== Biography ==
=== Early life and career ===
Belonging to Banda, Abatchou was born on 26 July 1926 in Mbihi. Mining operator by profession, he joined MESAN and became the Chief of Banda Vidri Canton in Yalinga in 1950. Other than that, he was also a member of the Haute Kotto and Yalinga subprefecture councils.

Dacko named Abatchou as a member of the MESAN managing committee and cabinet head at the Ministry of National Economy and Rural Action in 1962, positions that he served until 1966 and 1963, respectively. In the 1964 Central African parliamentary election, he was elected a member of the National Assembly representing Haute-Kotto District. Apart from that, he also founded a diamond and gold trading company, Kotto-Diamants, in Bria. While serving as MP, he also participated in the 5th Congress of UPC party in 1965 as a Central African delegate.

=== Arrest and death ===
Jean-Claude Mandaba arrested Abatchou on 1 January 1966 in the Saint-Sylvestre coup d'état and detained him in Camp Kassai. Later, he was transferred to Ngaragba Central Prison. During his imprisonment in Ngaragba, he was tortured with rifle butts and chained. On 1 January 1968, he confronted his torturers. Afterwards, the governments moved Abatchou to the Safari Hotel on 28 March, where he had lost his sanity. He died in the Safari Hotel on 28 April 1968.

== Personal life ==
One of Abatchou's daughters, Justine Veronique Abatchou, served as MP representing Yalinga (2005-?).

== Awards ==
- , Officer Order of Central African Merit – 1 December 1960.

== Bibliography ==
- Baccard, André (1987). Les Martyrs de Bokassa. Paris: Editions du Seuil.
