= Mbihi =

- Location in Central African Republic
- Coordinates: 6°27′58″N 22°40′8″E
- Country: Central African Republic
- Prefecture: Haute-Kotto
- Sub-prefecture: Yalinga
- Commune: Yalinga

Mbihi is a village situated 95 km from Bria in Haute-Kotto Prefecture, Central African Republic.

== History ==
In 1962, Mbihi had a population of 367 people.

In response to the CPC rebels' attack in Sam Ouandja on 4 July 2023, the villagers fled to Bria and Awalawa.

== Education ==
There is a school in the village.

== Healthcare ==
Mbihi has one health center. In December 2019, the village's health center did not have staff and medicines.

== Notable people ==
- Raoul Abatchou (1926 - 1968), Central African politician and mining operator
