= Richard Kouana =

Richard Kouana was a politician from the Central African Republic. He was born in N'Délé on October 3, 1913. He was a veterinary nurse by profession. He was elected to the Legislative Assembly (which later became the National Assembly) in the 1959 Central African parliamentary election, standing as a MESAN candidate in the Third Constituency.
