= Pambayamba =

- Location in Central African Republic
- Coordinates: 7.761383°N 23.393456°E
- Country: Central African Republic
- Prefecture: Haute-Kotto
- Sub-prefecture: Yalinga
- Commune: Yalinga

Pambayamba is a village situated in Haute-Kotto Prefecture, Central African Republic.

== History ==
In February 2016 George Odek, Lord Resistance Army commander surrendered in the village. In November 2017 LRA launched two attacks near the village robbing motorcycle drivers.

On 3 February 2020 RPRC attacked the Sara community in the village of Pambayamba after a young Goula man was murdered by FPRC fighter.

In April 2024 around 400 LRA fighters were reportedly present in the village.
