= Amiel Sayo =

Sultan of Bangassou
- In office 1936 – 12 March 1966
- Preceded by: Antoine Gounga
- Succeeded by: Emile Mbari Doba

Chief of Gounga Canton
- In office 1936 – 12 March 1966

Member of Territorial Assembly
- In office 1952–1957
- Constituency: Mbomou

Personal details
- Born: 1885 Bangassou, Sultanate of Bangassou
- Died: 12 March 1966 (aged 80–81) Bangui, Central African Republic
- Party: MESAN

Amiel Sayo (1885–12 March 1966) was a Central African Ngbandi politician who served as Member of Territorial Assembly (1952–1957) and Sultan of Bangassou (1936–1966).

== Biography ==
Belonging to the Bandia clan of Ngbandi, Sayo was born in Bangassou in 1885 to Bangassou and Nambika. In 1936, he became Sultan of Bangassou after the French colonial authorities dismissed his brother, Antoine Gounga, over embezzlement allegations. Moreover, the colonial government also appointed him as Chief of Gounga Canton in the same year. As both sultan and canton chief, he also served as the principal assessor of the Native Court of Mbomou until 28 March 1946 and the Commission for the Adjudication of Objections of Mbomou on 4 April 1950. He then served as the mayor of a rural municipality in Bangassou.

As a sultan, Sayo implored the French to restore the Bangassou Sultanate several times, and the requests were rejected. He also ordered his subjects to work at cotton plantations. Meanwhile, as the canton chief, Sayo received an annual allowance of 8,000 francs in 1938, the highest canton chief allowance in Bas-Mbomou. However, the colonial government halted his allowance for three months on 29 March 1946 due to misconduct that he committed.

When Boganda founded MESAN, he opposed it. In the 1952 election, Sayo, together with Martin Mouktar and Moumbe Kassa, ran as the candidates of the Territorial Assembly from the Union of Independents for the Defense of the Interests of Mbomou (UIDIM), and they won seats at the assembly. As a member of Territorial Assembly, they requested the Ubangi-Shari government for funding to improve infrastructure and public services in the Mbomou, including roads, bridges, schools, dispensaries, official housing, and security resources during the 1954 budget session.

Although Sayo opposed MESAN, he later allied with the party after the Central African Republic gained its independence from France in 1960. As a result, Dacko appointed him as the member of MESAN's managing committee.

Sayo died on 12 March 1966 in Bangui. He also became the stepfather of Jeanne-Marie Ruth-Rolland.

== Awards ==
- Order of the Black Star - 21 September 1951.
- , Knight Legion of Honour - 24 March 1952.
- , Knight Order of Central African Merit - 1 December 1961.

== Bibliography ==
- Government of French Equatorial Africa (15 April 1946). "Journal Officiel de l'Afrique Équatoriale Française". Brazzaville.
- Bradshaw, Richard; Rius, Juan Fandos (2016). Historical Dictionary of the Central African Republic (Historical Dictionaries of Africa). Lanham: Rowman & Littlefield.
