= Barnabé Nzilavo =

Mayor of Bangui
- In office 18 October 1977 – 20 February 1978
- President: Jean-Bédel Bokassa
- Preceded by: Antoine Grothe
- Succeeded by: Fred Patrice Zemoniako-Liblakenze
- In office 8 August 1972 – 11 February 1974
- President: Jean-Bédel Bokassa
- Preceded by: Jean Louis Psimhis
- Succeeded by: Louis Alazoula
- In office 20 May 1966 – 19 August 1968
- Preceded by: Etienne Pamala-Sambonga
- Succeeded by: Jean Michel Benzot

Mayor of 1st arrondissement of Bangui
- In office 30 September 1970 – 20 March 1971
- President: Jean-Bédel Bokassa
- Succeeded by: Louis Kpado

Member of Territorial Assembly
- In office 1952–1957
- Constituency: Ombella-M'Poko

Personal details
- Born: 15 September 1915 Yabimbo, Bimbo, Ubangi-Shari (now the Central African Republic)
- Died: Unknown
- Party: MESAN
- Occupation: Politician; Clerk

Barnabé Nzilavo, often written as Barnabé N'zilavo (15 September 1915 - ?), was a Central African politician, clerk, and accountant. He served as Mayor of Bangui thrice during the Bokassa regime.

== Biography ==
=== Early life and education ===
Nzilavo was born in Yabimbo near Bimbo on 15 September 1915. His father's name was Gbama, while his mother was Kondjiago. He studied in Petit séminaire de Maydi in Kisantu. During his school years, he befriended Barthélemy Boganda between 1924 and 1925.

=== Career ===
Nzilavo worked as a clerk at BAO in Bangui. While working at BAO, he earned the évolué status on 29 August 1945 and ran unsuccessfully as a socialist candidate representing the Second Constituency (Bangui) in the 1946 election.

On 1 January 1949, Nzivalo worked as an administrative officer at Bangui Treasury. Together with Boganda, he was one of the co-founders of MESAN party on 28 September 1949 and at the same time was appointed as the party's treasurer. In the 1952 election, he was elected as a member of Territorial Assembly representing Ombella-M'Poko district. Within the Territorial Assembly, he became its vice president together with Leonidas Leveque. He served as a member of parliament until 1957. Meanwhile, he was promoted from the 5th echelon to the 6th echelon, 3rd group, on 1 January 1954. While serving as Member of Territorial Assembly, he served as a member of the Bangui Municipal Commission, Chief of Gmbwaka Grouping in La Kouanga neighborhood, and Administrative Agent to the Accounting Office of the Planning Service. On 1 January 1957, he received another job promotion to 7th echelon, 3rd group.

Upon ending his term as a member of the Territorial Assembly, he became the chef de groupe (group leader) and head of La Kouanga neighborhood. As the head of La Kounga, he ordered the relocation of inhabitants who lived in a land claimed by Boganda. On 6 May 1959, he was assigned to territorial planning department as an officer. He was then appointed as the deputy adviser to the Criminal Court in Bangui on 14 January 1960. Previously, he served as an assessor of the Criminal Court from 1953 to 1959. On 9 August 1965, he became the head of accounting and equipment at the MESAN secretariat. As a high-ranking figure in MESAN, he was part of the party's delegation that visited Romania on 14 July 1972.

Bokassa named Nzivalo as a member of the High Council of the Judiciary (CSM) on 25 February 1966, a position he served until 1970. Meanwhile, he served as Mayor of Bangui three times under the Bokassa regime: 20 May 1966 to 19 August 1968, 8 August 1972 to 11 February 1974, and 18 October 1977 to 20 February 1978. Furthermore, he served as the mayor of the 1st arrondissement of Bangui from 1970 to 1971 and as Deputy Mayor of Bangui on 31 January 1975. He rejoined CSM in 1975 as a member and served it until 1979. After resigning from CSM, he retired.

Nzilavo died in unknown date and year.

== Personal life ==
Nzilavo was married.

== Award ==
- , Officer Order of Central African Merit - 1 December 1970.
