= Mbangana =

- Location in Central African Republic
- Coordinates: 7°31′28″N 23°13′52″E
- Country: Central African Republic
- Prefecture: Haute-Kotto
- Sub-prefecture: Yalinga
- Commune: Yalinga

Mbangana is a village situated in Haute-Kotto Prefecture, Central African Republic.

== History ==
In 2016, Mbangana was controlled by ex-Seleka militia and under threat from the LRA attack. On 3 January 2016, the LRA stormed the village and kidnapped six people. An alleged LRA attacked Mbangana on 31 December 2017, killing one person who refused to obey the group's order.

In 2023, Mbangana was under the control of FPRC. FACA captured Mbangana on 4 July 2024 from the rebels, forcing them to flee to Bamingui-Bangoran and Vakaga.

== Economy ==
There is a diamond mine near the village, which became the village's main income.
