= Kpokpo, Haute-Kotto =

Village in Haute-Kotto, Central African Republic

Kpokpo
- Location in Central African Republic
- Coordinates: 6°20′14″N 22°36′5″E
- Country: Central African Republic
- Prefecture: Haute-Kotto
- Sub-prefecture: Yalinga
- Commune: Yalinga

Kpokpo is a village situated in Haute-Kotto Prefecture, Central African Republic.

== History ==
LRA invaded Kpokpo on early December 2016, killing five people and abducting 15. Hundred of alleged UPC militias attacked Kpokpo on 4 February 2017 to avenge some of the locals participation and FPRC in a raid against Peuhl herders near Nzacko. They torched down and looted civilian houses and killed 12 men. An armed group entered Kpokpo on 2 March 2017, burning houses and killing two people. A clash between two warring armed groups ensued in the village on 31 May 2017.

UPC rebels visited Kpokpo on 12 September 2021 and stole money, motorcycles, and other items from the villagers.

== Economy ==
There is a diamond mine site 50 km from Kpokpo.
