= Kaouadja =

- Location in Central African Republic
- Coordinates: 8.008843°N 23.523433°E
- Country: Central African Republic
- Prefecture: Haute-Kotto
- Sub-prefecture: Yalinga
- Commune: Yalinga

Kaouadja is a village situated in Haute-Kotto Prefecture, Central African Republic, located on the banks of the river of the same name.

== History ==
Since 2015 Chadian rebels associated with Patriotic Rally for the Renewal of the Central African Republic have been present in the village. Arms trafficking route was going through Kaouadja.
