= Banda Linda =

Lindá
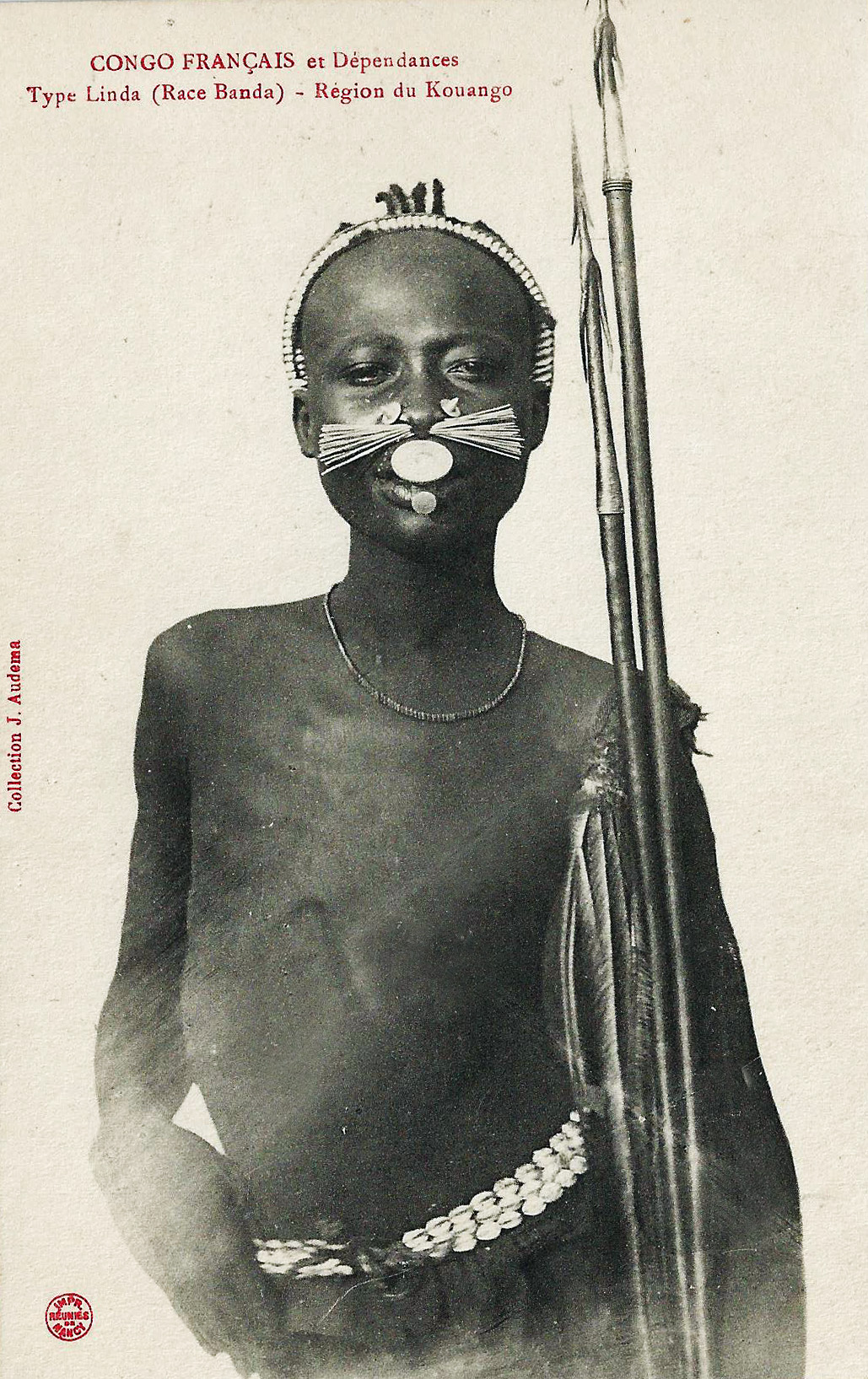

Regions with significant populations
- Central African Republic

Languages
- Lindá (Central Banda language)

Related ethnic groups
- Banda people

The Banda Linda are a small tribe living in the Central African Republic, primarily in the central and eastern regions of the country; they are primarily concentrated within the Ouaka, Haute-Kotto, and Basse-Kotto prefectures. They are a subgroup of the Banda people, distinguished by their language called Lindá, a Central Banda language.

They are known for their typical music style, involving long wooden pipes producing a single note. The Italian composer Luciano Berio (1925–2003) defined the community as "highly musical." The French-Israeli ethnomusicologist Simha Arom has described and collected their music.

== Instrument ==
The pipes can be known as the Banda Linda Horns, created with tree roots hollowed out by termites. They combine to make a polyrhythm.
