= GOX =

GOX, Gox, or GOx may refer to:

- Central Banda language
- Church of the Genuine Orthodox Christians of Greece
- Gaseous oxygen, as propellant in rocket engines
- Glucose oxidase (GOx)
- Gobu language
- Goxhill railway station, in England
- Hydroxyacid oxidase (glycolate oxidase) 1
- Mt. Gox, a former Bitcoin exchange
- Manohar International Airport
