= Awalawa =

- Location in Central African Republic
- Coordinates: 6°25′11″N 22°34′20″E
- Country: Central African Republic
- Prefecture: Haute-Kotto
- Sub-prefecture: Yalinga
- Commune: Yalinga

Awalawa is a village situated 72 km from north of Bria in Haute-Kotto Prefecture, Central African Republic.

== History ==
In 1962, Awalawa had a population of 141 people. The total of Awalawa population in 2012 was 2740 people. Around 2015 to 2016, Ex-Séléka erected checkpoints in the village to anticipate the LRA attack. However, one of the Awalawa residents stipulated that the militias harassed the villagers, especially the women.

== Education ==
Awalawa has one school.

== Healthcare ==
There is a health post in the village. In 2012, a Central African media, RJDH, reported that the health post lacked staff and medicines. In 2019, the situation was getting worse as the staff and medicines were absent in the health post.

== Bibliography ==
- Ngueuleu, Isidore (31 October 2016). Centrafrique: des zones non protégées (PDF) (Report).
