= Justine Véronique Abatchou =

Central African politician

Member of National Assembly
- In office 2005–?
- Constituency: Yalinga

Personal details
- Born: 1955 (age 70–71) Bria, Ubangi-Shari (now the present-day Central African Republic)
- Party: PSD; PNCN
- Parent: Raoul Abatchou (father)
- Occupation: Politician, midwife, entrepreneur

Justine Véronique Abatchou (born 1955) is a Central African politician, midwife, and entrepreneur.

== Life ==
Abatchou was born in Bria in 1955. Her father, Raoul Abatchou, is a politician who served as a Member of the National Assembly (1964-1966) and her mother is from Ouadda. She began her career by becoming a midwife’s assistant and was later promoted to midwife. She worked as a midwife in Ouadda hospital for 10 years. Afterwards, she resigned from her job as a midwife and became a businesswoman in Yalinga.

Abatchou ran at the 2005 Central African general election representing Yalinga from the PSD party and won a seat at the National Assembly as one of the 17 deputies who won the first round. Later, she left PSD and joined PNCN. In the 2011 Central African general election, she was reelected as an MP from the PNCN party representing Yalinga with a percentage of 70.47%.

== Award ==
- , Commander Order of Central African Merit - 2008.
