= Sultanate of Bangassou =

Traditional monarchy in the Central African Republic (1780–1917)

Sultanate of Bangassou Sultanat de Bangassou Sultân tî Bangasû
- 1780–1917
- Status: Traditional monarchy (sultanate) under the protectorate of the Congo Free State (1890–1894) and French Equatorial Africa (1894–1917)
- Capital: Bangassou
- Common languages: Banda, Nzakara, Sango, French
- Religion: African Traditional Religion (folk), Islam, Christianity
- Government: Absolute monarchy
- Sultan
  - c. 1780–c. 1800 (first): Ndounga
  - 1878–1907 (golden age): Bangassou
  - 1917 (last): Bozanga
- Historical era: Colonial era
  - Establishment of the Bandia dynasty: 1780
  - Disestablishment by France colonial authorities: 1917
- Currency: French franc (late)
Succeeded by
French Equatorial Africa
- The lineage of the sultans is still maintained as traditional cultural leaders today.

The Sultanate of Bangassou (French: Sultanat de Bangassou; Sango: Sultân tî Bangasû) is an organized traditional monarchy (sultanate) founded by the Bandia–Nzakara people along the northern region of the Ubangi River. Formed around 1780, the sultanate emerged as one of the first formal political entities among the Adamawa–Ubangi-speaking peoples of Equatorial Africa.

== History ==
=== Early establishment and initial development ===
Before the establishment of the sultanate around 1780, local Nzakara people were generally led by clan chiefs, village elders, or temporary warlords without any centralized inherited authority. A strong monarchical structure began to take root after the Bandia people migrated from south of the Uele River, assimilated into local customs, and consolidated power. The sultanate later took the name "Bangassou" from its famous ruler who succeeded in expanding the dynasty's territory in the late 19th century.

=== The golden age and diplomacy of Sultan Bangassou ===
In the period 1878 to 1890, Sultan Bangassou succeeded in securing his territory from external threats, including aggressive enslavement raids by the Zubayr dynasty led by Rabih al-Zubayr and the Mahdist State. Under his reign, the sultanate's strategic position on the banks of the Mbomou River was exploited to strengthen the economic sector through trade in high-value commodities. The sultanate established diplomatic relations and military alliances with European powers that were beginning to penetrate of Central Africa. Through this strategic partnership, especially with the exchange of elephant ivory supplies, Sultan Bangassou managed to build a very large military force with possession of around 2,500 modern firearms to defend domestic sovereignty and control regional trade routes.

=== Transition to French control and decline ===
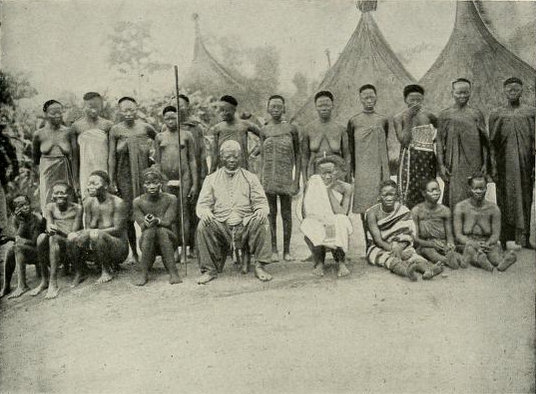
The Sultan of Bangassou and his wives, 1906.

The dynamics of the struggle for the Equatorial Africa region by European powers triggered a shift in the map of power in the Ubangi region. Under the 1887 border treaty between France and King Leopold II of Belgium, the area north of the Ubangi River was designated as a French zone of influence, which would later include the territory of the Sultanate of Bangassou. Initially, collaboration between the French colonial authorities and local rulers in the Upper Ubangi region ran harmoniously because the French implemented an indirect system of government. However, entering the early 20th century, the presence of European trading concession companies supported by the colonial government began to erode the absolute authority and trade monopoly previously held firmly by Sultan Bangassou.

=== The modern era and the abolition of sovereign authority ===
The political map of the sultanate changed completely after the death of the legendary Sultan Bangassou in 1907. The French colonial authorities gradually tightened their administrative control in the region. The successor to the throne, Sultan Bozanga, lost his political autonomy and was placed under house arrest by the French. In 1917, the French colonial authorities officially abolished the political sovereignty status of the Sultanate of Bangassou and merged its territory into the direct administrative system under the French Equatorial African colonies. Although its sovereign governmental function has collapsed, the sultanate's lineage remains as a traditionally recognized non-sovereign traditional monarchical figures and culture in the Central African Republic, with the reins of traditional leadership held by Sultan Maxime Faustin Mbringa Takama since 2011.

== Territory ==
The territory of the Sultanate of Bangassou was centered along the northern basin of the Mbomou River and the eastern part of the Ubangi River basin, which at that time formed the administrative region of Mbomou Prefecture in the southeast of the Central African Republic. As a political entity based on the Bandia–Nzakara clans, the geographical boundaries of the sovereignty of this sultanate include the sub-Sahelian savanna area and equatorial rainforest stretching west from the headwaters of the Chinko River to directly border the area of influence of the Sultanate of Rafaï to the east. The core area of the sultan's power was dominated by dense settlements of the Nzakara people in the southern region, especially around the cliffs of the Bangassou plateau which were militarily strategic to ward off invasions. Meanwhile, north of the 7th parallel, the sultanate's authority shrank to a semi-empty buffer zone separating its territory from the remains of the historical territories of Dar al-Kuti and Dar Fertit. The southern boundary of the sultanate is naturally locked by the waterways of the Mbomou and Ubangi rivers, which was later internationally agreed as the official dividing line with the Belgian colonial territory of the Congo Free State.

== Economy ==
The economy of the Sultanate of Bangassou in the 19th century was based on a monopoly system of trading high-value commodities and the exploitation of regional natural resources. Elephant ivory was the sultanate's main export commodity and was the most profitable in trans-regional trade with European traders and commercial caravan routes. The sultanate authorities imposed strict control over the domestic market network and collected tribute in the form of agricultural produce and labor from conquered clans.

In addition to the ivory trade, the subsistence farming sector based on the cultivation of sweet potatoes, sorghum, and local food crops along the banks of the Mbomou River supports the stability of the domestic food supply. However, entering the early 20th century, economic intervention by the French colonial government through granting operating permits to European trading concession companies (compagnies concessionnaires) triggering the practice of unilateral exploitation of natural resources. The presence of these concession companies usurped the sultan's commercial trade monopoly rights, damaged the local market structure, and transferred economic control completely into the hands of the colonial trade cartel.

== Demographics ==
Demographically, the Sultanate of Bangassou was formed by a heterogeneous social structure with a dominant cultural assimilation of the Bandia and Nzakara (Sakara) people. The Bandia people served as the ruling minority political and military aristocracy, while the majority of the general population of the sultanate consists of Adamawa–Ubangi-speaking peoples and other local clans. Population mobility in this region is significantly influenced by external security pressures; military conflicts and aggressive slave raids launched by external powers from the northern region forcing various local migrant groups to flee and sought refuge under the centralized military authority of the Sultan of Bangassou.

Social integration within the sultanate was marked by the practice of a large-scale polygamy system among the traditional ruling elite as a diplomatic instrument to bind inter-clan loyalty. When the political sovereignty of the sultanate collapsed and was abolished by the French colonial authorities in the early 20th century, the forced dissolution of the traditional marriage institution triggered changes in demographic structure, disintegration of traditional family institutions, and the mass emancipation of women in the residential centers of the sultanate.

== Religion ==
=== Overview ===
Religious life in the Sultanate of Bangassou is characterized by strong syncretism and the dual function of Islamic-based law and local belief traditions (animistic). As a sultanate led by a Muslim ruler, the Quran and Islamic law were used by the sultan and the monarchical elite as the highest pillars in the administration of leadership, political legitimacy, as well as high-level dispute resolution. However, there are fundamental differences between the Sultanate of Bangassou and the sultanates in the northern region such as Dar al-Kuti which implemented Islamic law rigidly. In Bangassou, the judicial system and customary rules of the community are still largely rooted in the traditional cosmology of the Bandia–Nzakara people, including the use of occult practices and ancestral religious rites as instruments of social compliance.

The general public at the grassroots level largely maintains belief in local supernatural gods combined with reverence for the protective spirits of nature, while assimilation into Islamic culture was generally limited to court circles and trans-regional merchant networks. The religious landscape in the former sultanate's territory only shifted massively after the collapse of the sultan's political sovereignty in 1917, when a wave of European missionaries from the order of the Spiritains (Congregation of the Holy Spirit) entered and established the first formal Roman Catholic mission in the town of Bangassou in 1922.

=== The arrival of Islam to Bangassou ===
The arrival of Islam in the region of the Sultanate of Bangassou was closely linked to the expansion of the trans-Saharan caravan trade network and slave trade routes from the Nile Valley since the 17th and 18th centuries. In contrast to the North African region which experienced Islamization through military expansion, the penetration of Islam in the upper equatorial region of the Ubangi River took place through cultural diffusion and long-distance trade which could be said to be quite peaceful. Muslim traders from the Sudan region, including the jallaba and faki clans (religious teachers and traveling merchants), began to interact intensively with the rulers of the Bandia dynasty in Bangassou to secure a supply of elephant ivory. Through their strong military bargaining position, the Bangassou rulers acted as prosperous intermediaries who controlled the barter routes; They exchanged their prey and prisoners of war for firearms, cloth, and salt from the Islamic world to the north.

Islamization in the Sultanate of Bangassou was centered in the elite palace environment and did not touch the rural community on a massive scale. The Bandia people, who were a ruling minority, adopted the title "Sultan" and elements of Islamic law as instruments of political prestige, diplomasi luar negeri, and strengthening the legitimacy of their absolute power over the majority of the Nzakara population who still adhere to animism. The peak of institutional recognition of Islamization occurred in the early 1890s when European colonial agents formally confirmed the legal status of the traditional monarchy as a sovereign sultanate together with its neighbors, the Sultanate of Rafaï and the Sultanate of Zémio. However, the structure of community obedience under the auspices of Islam in Bangassou finally came to a structural halt after the French administrative authorities carried out the forced dissolution of the sultanate in 1917.

== List of rulers ==
The following is a list of rulers (sultans) who led the Bandia dynasty in the Sultanate of Bangassou from its founding until the abolition of political sovereignty by France colonial authorities, and his continuation as a traditional customary leader:

No.	Ruler	Term of office	Notes
1	Ndounga	c. 1780 – c. 1800	Founder of the Bandia dynasty in the Nzakara region.
2	Mbilinga	c. 1800 – c. 1830	
3	Gbandi	c. 1830 – c. 1860	
4	Mbari	c. 1860 – 1878	Consolidating local clans along the Mbomou River.
5	Bangassou	1878 – 8 June 1907	Golden era; signed protectorate treaties with Belgium and France. His name is immortalized in the names of the sultanate and the modern city.
6	Labasso	June 1907 – 18 February 1917	
7	Bozanga	18 February 1917 – 1917	The last sovereign sultan; his political power was completely removed by the French colonial authorities in 1917.
Traditional leader/traditional monarch (non-sovereign)
8	Kelenga	1917 – 1932	
9	Antoine Gounga	1932-1936	
10	Fadama	1936	
11	Amiel Sayo	1936 – 12 March 1966	
12	Emile Mbari Doba	1966 – 20 June 2011	
13	Maxime Faustin Mbringa Takama	2011 – present	The current culturally recognized traditional sultan in the Central African Republic.

== See also ==
- Sultanate of Rafaï – A neighboring Bandia-led sister sultanate located east of Bangassou.
- Sultanate of Zémio – Another prominent traditional sultanate in the Mbomou River basin.
- Dar al-Kuti – A contemporary Islamic state and slave-trading sultanate to the north.
- Ubangi-Shari – The French colonial territory that later incorporated the suppressed sultanates.
- Mbomou – The modern prefecture of the Central African Republic encompassing the former sultanate's lands.
