= BQK =

BQK or bqk may refer to:

- BQK, the IATA and FAA LID code for Brunswick Golden Isles Airport, Georgia, United States
- bqk, the ISO 639-3 code for Banda-Mbrès language
