= 1964 presidential election =

1964 presidential election may refer to:

- 1964 Central African Republic presidential election
- 1964 Chilean presidential election
- 1964 Icelandic presidential election
- 1964 United States presidential election
