= Order of the Black Star =

Ordre de l'Étoile Noire
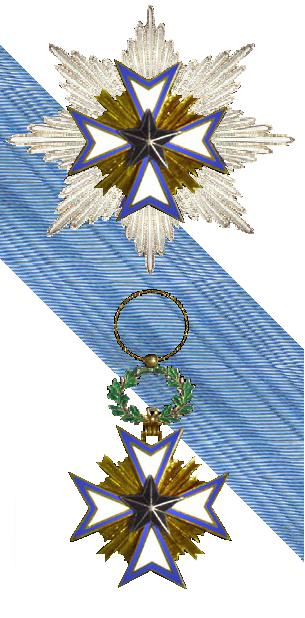
- The Grand Croix badge, ribbon and plaque
- Type: Order with five degrees: Grand-Croix; Commandeur avec Plaque; Commandeur; Officier; Chevalier
- Presented by: FranceBenin
- Status: Deprecated 3 December 1963 by the Ordre National du Mérite
- Established: 1 December 1889

Precedence
- Next (higher): Médaille militaire
- Equivalent: Ordre national du Mérite
- Next (lower): Croix de guerre

The Order of the Black Star (Ordre de l'Étoile Noire) was an order of knighthood established on 1 December 1889 at Porto-Novo by Toffa, future king of Dahomey (today the Republic of Benin). Approved and recognised by the French government on 30 July 1894, after the establishment of the new statutes of 30 August 1892, according this distinction to all those who worked to develop French influence on the west coast of Africa.

The establishment of the Order in the style of the Legion of Honor was the result of Toffe of Porto-Novo's victory over King Benhazine of Abomey and the establishment of French influence.

== Classes ==
The order has five classes: Grand-Croix (Grand Cross), Commandeur avec Plaque (Commander with Plaque), Commandeur (Commander), Officier (Officer), and Chevalier (Knight).

Grand-Croix
Commandeur avec Plaque
Commandeur
Officier
Chevalier

The order was deprecated by decree on 3 December 1963, and superseded by the Ordre National du Mérite. Extant members of the order are permitted to wear their original decorations.

== Recipients ==
- Grand Crosses
  - Amha Selassie
  - Hamengkubuwono VIII
  - Edgard de Larminat
  - Jean de Lattre de Tassigny
  - Charles Debbas
- Commanders with Plaque
  - Michel Arnaud
  - Pedro Correia de Barros
  - Gustaf Bonde (1911–1977)
  - Smedley Butler
  - Jacob Emil van Hoogstraten
  - Harry J. Malony
  - Jacques Massu
  - Ernest Dichmann Peek
  - Bengt Rabaeus
  - Howard Robertson (architect)
  - Sisavang Vong
- Commanders
  - Ewart Culpin
  - William H. Hay
  - John H. Hughes (general)
  - Palden Thondup Namgyal
  - Pakubuwono X
  - Wilhelm Winther
  - Arthur Young (police officer)
  - Smedley Butler
  - El Hadj Diallo Alfa Bakar
  - John H. Sherburne
  - Edward Vollrath
- Officers
  - John Thomas Kennedy
  - Agbanon II
- Knights
  - Jacques Chirac
  - Philip Sassoon
  - George A. White
  - Agbanon II
- Unknown Class
  - Willy Coppens
  - John F. Curry
  - Ernest J. Dawley
  - Pierre Pouyade
  - Michael Scott (golfer)
  - Emmet Harris
  - Amiel Sayo
  - Gabriel Pounaba
  - Ibrahim Tello
