= Simha Arom =

French-Israeli ethnomusicologist

- שמחה ארום
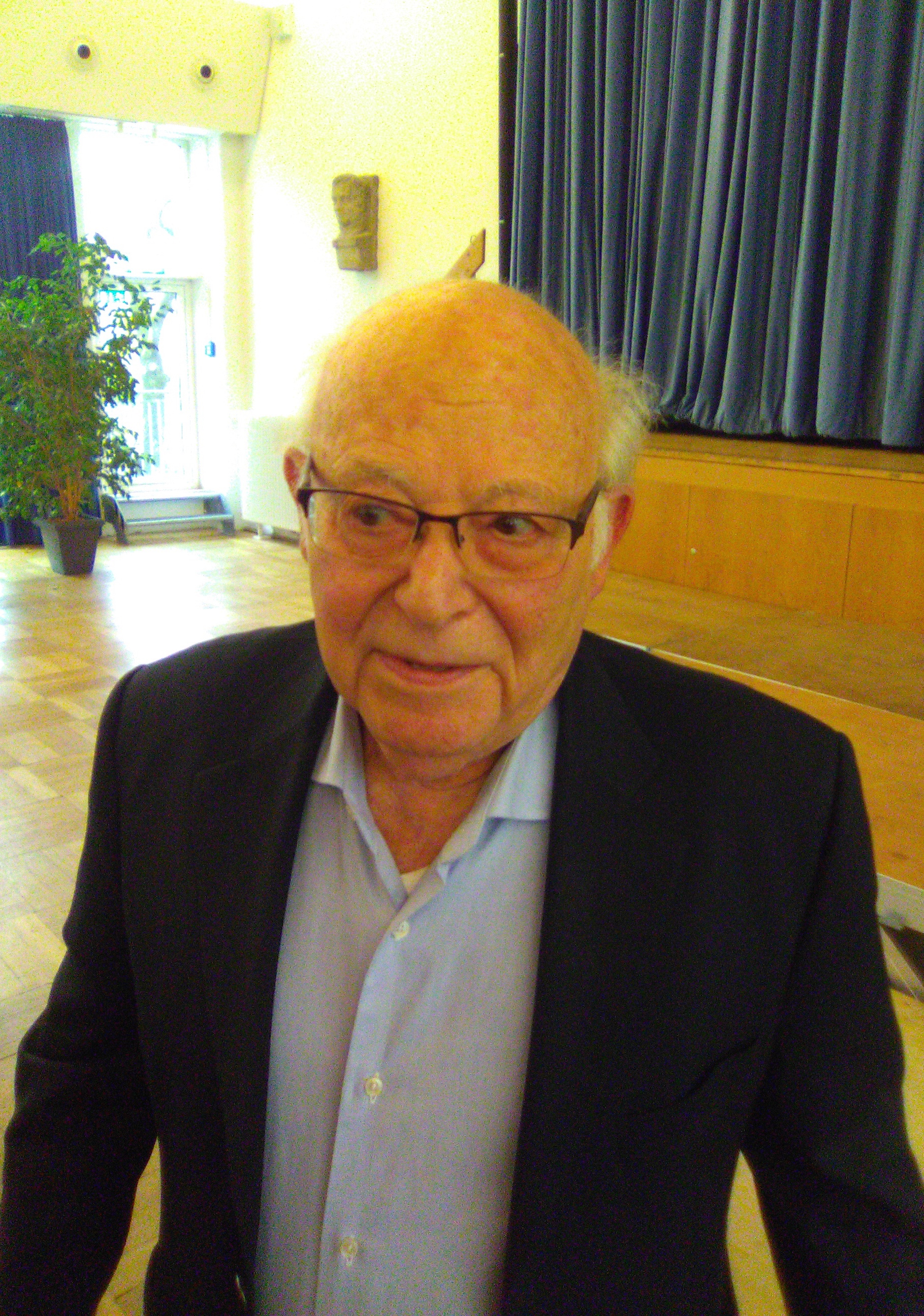
- Simha Arom in 2016
- Born: Simha Arom; August 16, 1930 (age 96); Düsseldorf, Germany
- Education: Conservatoire National Supérieur de Musique of Paris
- Occupation: Ethnomusicologist
- Employer: CNRS (Research Director Emeritus)
- Known for: Research on Central African music, especially Aka Pygmy music
- Notable work: African Polyphony and Polyrhythm: Musical Structure and Methodology (1991)
- Awards: Médaille d'Argent du C.N.R.S. (1984); Chevalier des Arts et des Lettres (2007); 20th Annual Koizumi Fumio Prize for Ethnomusicology (2008); Dr. Honoris Causa, HfMT-University of Music Hamburg (2020)

Simha Arom (Hebrew: שמחה ארום; born 16 August 1930) is a French-Israeli ethnomusicologist who is recognized as a world expert on the music of central Africa, especially that of the Central African Republic. He also made influential field recordings of Aka Pygmy and Banda Linda music.

In the 1960s, Arom was sent by the Government of Israel to establish a brass band in the Central African Republic. He became fascinated by the traditional music of this country, especially the vocal polyphonies of the Aka Pygmies. He entered the CNRS in 1968 and in 1984 he received its Silver Medal. He did field work every year from 1971 to 1991, accompanied by ethnolinguists and students, to record this music to study it and preserve it.

Arom was awarded a First Prize for French Horn at the Conservatoire National Supérieur de Musique of Paris before becoming an ethnomusicologist. Using interactive experiments, he has worked on uncovering implicit musical systems and the way in which cultures build cognitive categories as attested in their music. His work is based on the postulate that, in order for it to be valid, data collected in the field must be corroborated by cognitive data specific to the holders of the culture studied.

His research topics include the temporal organization of music, musical scales, polyphonic techniques, music in the social system and the elaboration of conceptual tools for the categorization, analysis and modeling of traditional music. From a mostly descriptive discipline, he has tried to build a science in the full sense of the word, with all of its attributes: experimentation, verification, validation, modeling, conceptualization and reconstitution by means of synthesis.

Arom is Research Director Emeritus at the CNRS, a founding member of the Société française d'ethnomusicologie, the Société française d'analyse musicale, the European Society for the Cognitive Sciences of Music (ESCOM) and the European Seminar in Ethnomusicology; he is also a member of the Société française de musicologie and the Board of directors of The Universe of Music project (UNESCO).

He has been a visiting professor at many universities – particularly Montreal, UCLA, Vancouver, M.I.T., Cambridge (U.K.), Tel-Aviv, Bar-Ilan, Haifa, Basel, Zurich, Siena, and Venice.

His sound archives were deposited in 2011 at the sound library of the Bibliothèque nationale de France. Arom was the subject of the 2014 documentary SIMHA by Jerome Blumberg.

His research and recordings of Aka Pygmy and Banda Linda music have inspired composers such as Luciano Berio, György Ligeti, Steve Reich, Fabien Lévy, Jacques Demierre and Fabian Panisello.

== Awards ==
- 1971 : Grand Prix International du Disque, Académie Charles Cros
- 1978 : Grand Prix International du Disque, Académie Charles Cros, Mention In Honorem, "Prix du Président de la République"
- 1984 : Médaille d'Argent du C.N.R.S.
- 1985 : Grand Prix International du Disque, Académie Charles Cros, "Prix André Schaeffner"
- 1988 : Grand Prix du Disque, Nouvelle Académie du Disque, ‘Palmarès des palmarès’
- 1992 : ASCAP (American Society of Composers, Authors & Publishers), Deems Taylor Award for Excellence in Music literature, New York
- 1998 :
  - Prix Moebius International
  - Grand Prix Investigation et publication scientifique, 3ème Festival du Film de Chercheur, Nancy
  - 7e Prix Möbius France, Multimédia, Sciences, Cultures, Éducation
  - Honorary life member, European Seminar in Ethnomusicology
- 1999 : Prix Spécial “Cédéroms”, 4ème Festival du Film de Chercheur, Nancy
- 2007 : Chevalier des Arts et des Lettres
- 2008 :
  - 20th Annual Koizumi Fumio Prize for Ethnomusicology (Tokyo)
  - Prix International de la Fondation Fyssen (Paris)
- 2012 : Honorary Member, International Musicological Society.
- 2014 :
  - Prix Francine et Antoine Bernheim pour les sciences (Paris)
  - Honorary Professor, State Conservatoire, Tbilisi (Georgia)
- 2017 : Honorary member, Association française du cor (Paris)
- 2020 : Dr. Honoris Causa, HfMT-University of Music Hamburg (Germany)

== Tributes ==
- Analyse Musicale 23 (1991) "Analyse et expérimentation – En hommage à Simha Arom et à son équipe"
- « Ndroje balendro ». Musiques, terrains et disciplines, Textes offerts à Simha Arom (V. Dehoux, S. Fürniss, S. Le Bomin, E. Olivier, H. Rivière, F. Voisin, éd.), 1995, Louvain-Paris, Peeters
- Bibliothèque nationale de France : « Journée en Hommage à Simha Arom », 9 juin 2011
- Honorary Professorship, Tbilisi State Conservatory (Georgia), 2014

== Books ==
- Conte et chantefables ngbaka-ma'bo (République centrafricaine), Paris, Selaf, "Bibliothèque" 21–22, 1970, 238 p.
- Les mimbo, génies du piégeage et le monde surnaturel des Ngbaka-Ma'bo (République centrafricaine), Paris, Selaf, "Bibliothèque" 44–45, 1975, 153 p. (en collaboration avec Jacqueline M. C. Thomas)
- Polyphonies instrumentales d'Afrique centrale : structure et méthodologie, Paris, Selaf, "Collection Ethnomusicologie" 1, 1985, 2 vol., 905 p.
- African Polyphony and Polyrhythm. Structure and Methodology (Préface de Györgi Ligeti), Cambridge, Cambridge University Press, 2004 [1991], 668 p.
- Précis d'ethnomusicologie, Paris, CNRS éditions, 2007, 173 p. (en collaboration avec Frank Alvarez-Péreyre)
- La boîte à outils d'un ethnomusicologue (textes réunis et préfacés par Nathalie Fernando), Les Presses de l'Université de Montréal, 2007, 421 p.
- La fanfare de Bangui , Paris, Éditions La Découverte, 2009, 208 p.

== Articles (selection) ==
- « Essai d'une notation des monodies à des fins d'analyse », Revue de Musicologie 55, 1969, pp. 172–216.
- « The Use of Play-Back Techniques in the Study of Oral Polyphonies », Ethnomusicology 20, 1976, pp. 483–519.
- « New Perspectives for the Description of Orally Transmitted Music », The World of Music XXIII/2, 1981, pp. 40–60.
- « Musiques d'ici et d'ailleurs ». In Cl. Samuel éd., Éclats/Boulez, Paris, Centre Pompidou, 1986, pp. 90–97.
- « Modélisation et modèles dans les musiques de tradition orale », Analyse Musicale 22, 1991, pp. 67–78.
- « A synthesizer in the Central African bush. A Method of Interactive Exploration of Musical Scales ». In Für Ligeti. Die Referate des Ligeti-Kongresses Hamburg 1988, Laaber, Laaber-Verlag, 1991, pp. 163–178.
- « L'étude des échelles dans les musiques traditionnelles : une approche interactive », Analyse Musicale 23 : “Analyse et expérimentation – En hommage à Simha Arom et à son équipe”, 1991, pp. 21–29.
- « Une parenté inattendue : polyphonies médiévales et polyphonies africaines ». In M. Huglo & M. Pérès éds, Polyphonies de tradition orale : histoire et traditions vivantes. Paris, Créaphis, 1994, pp. 133–148.
- « Intelligence in Traditional Music ». In J. Khalfa ed., What is Intelligence? (‘Darwin College Lectures 1992’), Cambridge and New York, Cambridge University Press, 1994, pp. 137–160.
- « La musique africaine : un savoir qui s’ignore ? ». In A. Sureau éd., Qu’est-ce qu’on ne sait pas ? : Les rencontres philosophiques de l’UNESCO, collection « Découvertes Gallimard » (nº 306). Paris: Gallimard, 1995, pp. 48–55.
- « Le ‘syndrome’ du pentatonisme africain », Musicae Scientiae. The Journal of the European Society for the Cognitive Sciences of Music – Forum de discussion I/2, 1997, pp. 139–161.
- « Une raison en acte. Pensée formelle et systématique musicale dans les sociétés de tradition orale », Revue de Musicologie 84/1, (in collab. with J. Khalfa), 1998, pp. 5–17.
- « ‘L’arbre qui cachait la forêt’ » : principes métriques et rythmiques en Centrafrique », Liber Amicorum Célestin Deliège, Revue belge de Musicologie 52, 1999, pp. 179–195.
- « ‘Descartes en Afrique’ : les musiques traditionnelles, domaine privilégié d’étude de la rationalité ». In V. Gomez-Pin, éd., Descartes. Lo racional y lo real. EnraHonar, Quaderns de Filosofia – Numero extraordinari (in collab. with J. Khalfa), 1999 pp. 317–322.
- « La musique comme pensée pure », Les temps modernes 609 (in collab. with J. Khalfa), 2000, pp. 307–325.
- « Prolegomena to a Biomusicology », In N. L. Wallin, B. Merker, S. Brown eds, The Origins of Music, Cambridge (MA), M.I.T. Press, 2000, pp. 27–31.
- « ‘En busca del tiempo perdido’ : la metrica y el ritmo en la musica », Quodlibet. Revista de especializacion musical 16, 2000, pp. 3–14.
- « L’ethnomusicologie est-elle condamnée à rester une science ‘molle’ » ? In J.-M. Chouvel & F. Lévy éds, Observation, analyse, modèles : peut-on parler d’art avec les outils de la science ?, Paris, L’Harmattan / Ircam, (in collab. with N. Fernando), 2002, pp. 427–450.
- « L’aksak. Principes et typologie », Cahiers de musiques traditionnelles 17 : “Formes musicales”, 2005, pp. 11–48.
- « L’organisation du temps musical : essai de typologie ». In J.-J. Nattiez éd., Musiques. Une encyclopédie pour le XXIe siècle, vol. V. Paris, Actes Sud / Cité de la Musique, 2007, pp. 927–941.
- « Typologie des techniques polyphoniques ». In J.-J. Nattiez éd., Musiques. Une encyclopédie pour le XXIe siècle, vol. V. Paris, Actes Sud / Cité de la Musique (in collab. with N. Fernando, S. Fürniss, S. Le Bomin, F. Marandola, E. Olivier, H. Rivière, O. Tourny), 2007, pp. 1088–1109.
- « ‘À plusieurs voix’. La conception wébérienne de la plurivocalité vue par un ethnomusicologue », Revue de Synthèse, tome 129, 6e série, n° 2, 2008, pp. 285–296.
- « La catégorisation des patrimoines musicaux dans les sociétés de tradition orale ». In F. Alvarez-Pereyre éd., Catégories et Catégorisation. Perspectives interdisciplinaires, Paris, Peeters (in collab. with N. Fernando, S. Fürniss, S. Le Bomin, F. Marandola, J. Molino), 2009, pp. 273–313.
- « Entre parole et musique. Les languages tambourinés d’Afrique subsaharienne ». In S. Dehaene & Ch. Petit éds, Parole et musique. Aux origines du dialogue humain (Colloque 2008). Paris, Odile Jacob (‘Collection du Collège de France’), 2009, pp. 183–199.
- « Towards a Theory of the Chord Syntax in Georgian Polyphony ». In J. Jordania & R. Tsurtsumia eds, Proceedings of the Third International Symposium on Traditional Polyphony, Tbilissi. Tbilissi State Conservatoire. (in collab. with P. Vallejo), 2010, pp. 309–335.
- « Corroborating external observation by cognitive data in the description and modelling of traditional music ». In Musicae Scientiae Special Issue 2010 – “Understanding musical structure and form : Papers in honour of Irène Deliège, 2010, pp. 295–306.
- « Comprendre la musique : une nouvelle voie ». In Académie des Beaux-Arts – Communications 2009–2010 (Séance du 2 juin 2010). Paris, Institut de France, 2010, pp. 55–60.
- « Polifonias de tradicion oral : Africa subsahariana ». In F. Jarauta ed., Forma y tiempos de la musica. Santander, Fundacion Botin (in collab. with P. Vallejo), 2011, pp. 87–123.
- « Gespräch mit Simha Arom ». In M.-A. Dittrich & R. Kapp eds, Anklaenge 2010 – Wiener Jahrbuch für Musikwissenschaft, 2011, pp. 29–44.
- « A Kinship Foreseen : Ligeti and African Music ». In L. Duchesneau & W. Marx eds, György Ligeti – Of Foreign Lands and Strange Sounds. Woodbridge, Boydell & Brewer, 2011, pp. 107–122.
- « ‘Combining Sounds to Reinvent the World’. World Music, Sociology and Musical Analysis ». In M. Tenzer & J. Roeder eds, Analytical and Cross-Cultural Studies in World Music, New York, Oxford University Press (in collab. with D.-C. Martin), 2011, pp. 388–413.

== Discography (selection) ==
- Musiques de la République Centrafricaine, 1966;
- Musiques Banda, 1971 (Grand Prix du Disque de l'Académie Charles-Cros);
- Aka Pygmy Music, 1994 [1973];
- Rondes et jeux chantés Banda-Linda (République Centrafricaine), 1974;
- Ceremonial Music from Northern Dahomey, 1975;
- The Fulani, 1988 [1976];
- Banda Polyphonies, 1992 [1976];
- Bénin. Musiques Bariba et Somba, 1994 [1977];
- Cameroon. Baka Pygmy Music, 1990 [1977];
- Anthologie de la musique des Pygmées Aka ('Prix du Président de la République', Académie Charles Cros), 2003 [1978, 1988];
- Central African Republic, 1989 [1984];
- Grèce. Bouzouki. 'Hommage à Tsitsanis' (with Tatiana Yannopoulos), ('Prix André Schaeffner', Académie Charles Cros), 1983;
- Liturgies juives d’Éthiopie (with Frank Alvarez-Pereyre), 1990;
- Grèce. Épire 'Takoutsia', Musiciens de Zagori (with Tatiana Yannopoulos), 1990;
- Polyphonies vocales des Pygmées Mbenzele' (with Denis-Constant Martin), 1992;
- Greece. Vocal Monodies (with Tatiana Yannopoulos), 1994;
- Ligeti / Reich / Aka Pygmies: African Rhythms (with Pierre-Laurent Aimard), 2003;
- Géorgie. Polyphonies sacrées et profanes (with Polo Vallejo), 2012.

== Filmography ==
- L'arc musical ngbaka, 16 mm, black and white, 1970, CNRS-Comité du film ethnographique (11 minutes)
- Les enfants de la danse, 16 mm, color, 1970, CNRS-Comité du film ethnographique (with Geneviève Dournon) (13 minutes)
- Ango : une leçon de musique africaine, 1997, CNRS Images/Média (36 minutes), Grand-Prix du Festival du Film de Chercheur, Nancy 1998.

== See also ==
- Pygmy music
- Colin Turnbull
