= Ernest Dichmann Peek =

United States Army general

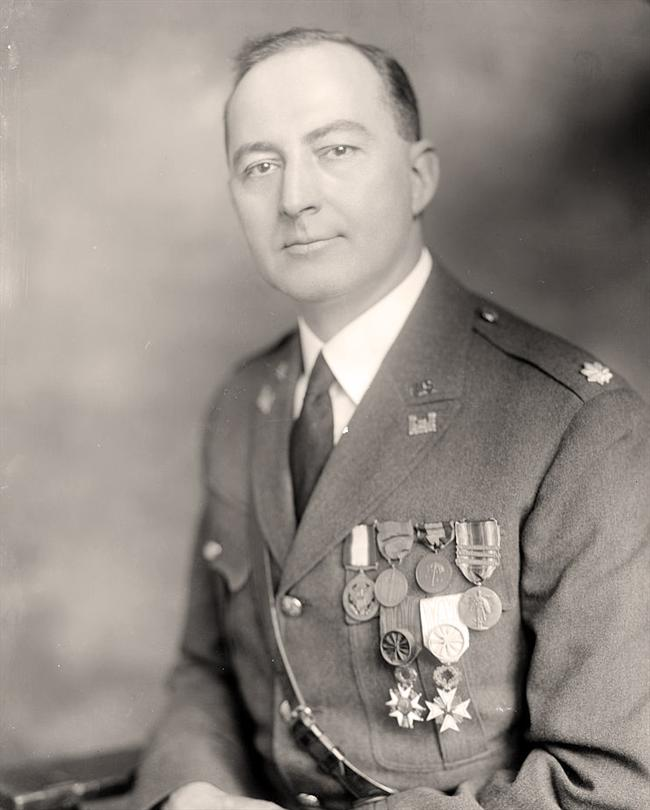
- Peek in uniform
- Born: November 19, 1878; Oshkosh, Wisconsin, US
- Died: April 22, 1950 (aged 71); San Francisco, California, US
- Burial place: Arlington National Cemetery
- Military career
- Branch: United States Army
- Service years: 1901–1942
- Rank: Major General
- Battles: War with Spain; Philippine Insurrection; World War I; St. Mihiel; Meuse–Argonne; Defensive Sector; World War II
- Awards: Distinguished Service Medal; Silver Star

Signature
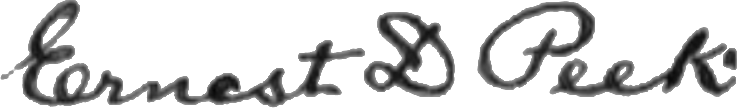

Ernest Dichmann Peek (November 19, 1878 – April 22, 1950) was a major general in the United States Army, who commanded the 9th Corps Area at the beginning of World War II.

== Biography ==
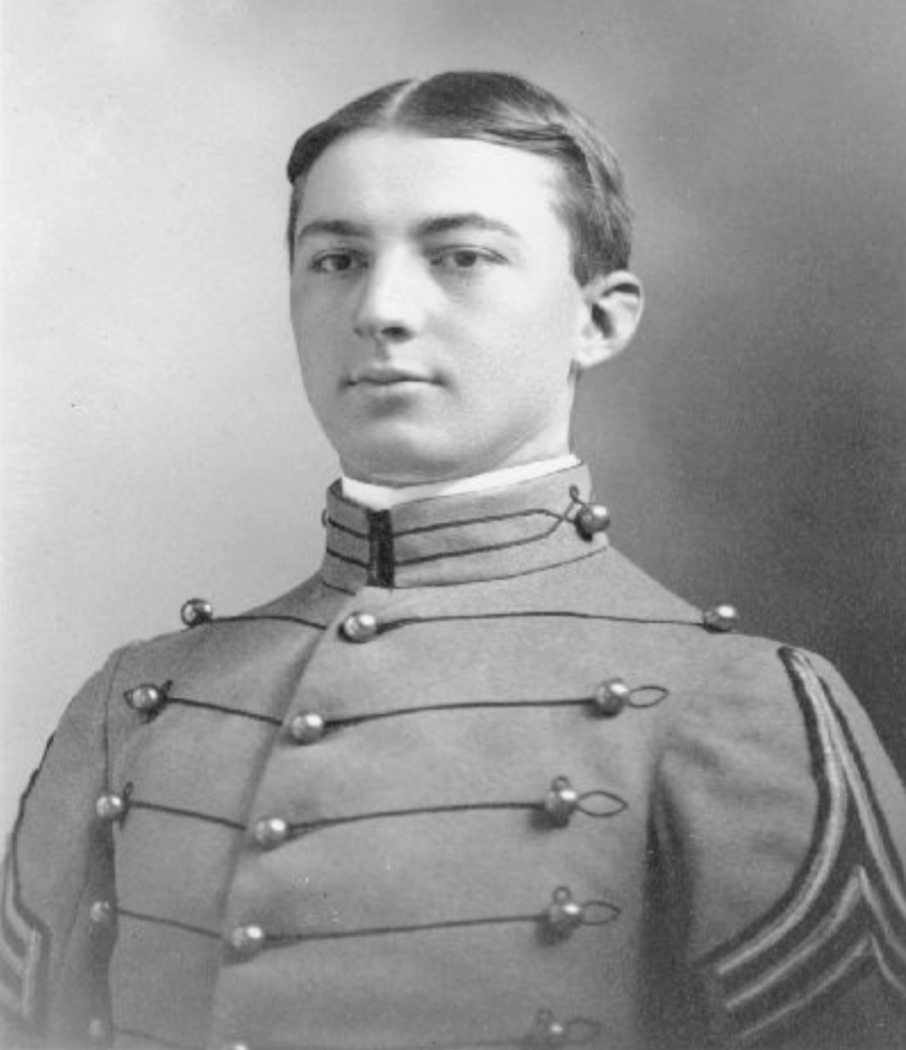
At West Point in 1901

Peek was born on November 19, 1878, in Oshkosh, Wisconsin. Peek graduated fourth in his class at the United States Military Academy on February 18, 1901, and joined the Corps of Engineers. Then he served in Philippines during the Philippine Insurrection, where he was assigned to the road and wharf construction units. Peek was decorated with the Silver Star for gallantry in action against the Moros during this service.

In 1906, he was assigned to Yellowstone National Park to help with engineering projects. From 1912 to 1926 he supervised improvements of the harbor on Lake Superior and was also in charge of the building of Lock and Dam No. 1, Mississippi River.

During World War I, Peek served with 21st Engineers within American Expeditionary Force in France. For his service during the war, he was awarded with Army Distinguished Service Medal and with Legion of Honour by the Government of France.

Following the war he was assigned to the Panama Canal Zone. He attended the Babson Institute in 1927 and later obtain a L.L.D. from the University of Wyoming College of Law. In 1929 he was assigned to New York City to work on rivers and harbors. He was named a brigade commander at Fort Francis E. Warren in 1937.

In 1940 he was named commander of the 9th Corps Area. Peek retired in 1942 due to physical disability. He was the last remaining member of the class of 1901 to serve on active duty.

Peek died at his home in San Francisco, California on April 22, 1950. He is buried with his wife, Ann Ryan Peek (1885–1971), at Arlington National Cemetery.

== Decorations ==
Below is the ribbon bar of Major General Peek:

| 1st Row | Army Distinguished Service Medal | | | Silver Star |
| 2nd Row | Spanish War Service Medal | Philippine Campaign Medal | World War I Victory Medal with three Battle Clasps | American Defense Service Medal |
| 3rd Row | American Campaign Medal | World War II Victory Medal | Officer of the French Order of the Legion of Honour | Officer of the French Ordre de l'Étoile Noire |
