= Emile Mbari Doba =

Sultan of Bangassou
- In office 1966 – 20 June 2011
- Preceded by: Amiel Sayo
- Succeeded by: Maxime Faustin Mbringa Takama

Personal details
- Born: 5 June 1920 Bakouma, Ubangi-Shari
- Died: 20 June 2011 (aged 91)

Military service
- Allegiance: France
- Branch/service: French Army
- Years of service: 19 June 1940–1958
- Rank: Sergeant
- Unit: Troupes coloniales
- Battles/wars: World War II: Battle of Bir Hakeim

Emile Mbari Doba (5 June 1920 – 20 June 2011) was a Central African soldier and politician who served as the Sultan of Bangassou from 1966 to 2011.

== Biography ==
Doba was born in Bakouma on 5 June 1920. He was the grandson of Bangassou. On 19 June 1940, he was enlisted in the Senegalese Tirailleurs of the French Army. He participated in World War II under the Oubanguian Tirailleurs of the 2nd Marching Battalion.

After World War II ended, Doba enrolled in an NCO cadet course and managed to finish it. As a result, his rank was promoted to sergeant and he served at the 4th Colonial Infantry Division. He was posted at Caserne du Muy, Marseille. Afterward, he was stationed in Algiers, then Casablanca, and eventually Camp de Roux, Bangui. While stationed in Camp de Roux, he became the company adjutant. He retired from military service in 1958.

Doba became the Sultan of Bangassou in 1966 after the death of Amiel Sayo. He served as sultan until his death on 20 June 2011 and was replaced by Maxime Faustin Mbringa Takama.

Doba was married and had children. One of his children, Lucien Mbari, was born on 5 January 1954 in Bangui.

== Awards ==
- Médaille militaire
- Croix de Guerre
- Combatant's Cross
- Colonial Medal
