= Dukpu people =

Dukpu is an ethnic group of the Central African Republic, Democratic Republic of Congo, and Sudan. They speak Central Banda, a Ubangian language.

In 1904, Yangu, the chief of the Banda Dukpu, relocated his people to Deim Zubeir from their settlement near the Mbari River, at the same time when other Banda tribes were escaping from French harassment and the tribal leader Sanusi. This resulted in the Dukpu considering Sanusi as the greatest enemy of their people.
