= 1946 Ubangi-Shari Representative Council election =

- 15 December 1946
- All 25 seats in the Representative Council; 13 seats needed for a majority
Party	Leader	Seats
First College
Chamber of Commerce-linked list		10
Second College
Ubangian Economic and Social Action	Georges Darlan	15
This lists parties that won seats. See the complete results below.
Chairman of the Representative Council after
Léon Gaume

Representative Council elections were held in Ubangi-Shari on 15 December 1946. There were two separate colleges of voters; ten seats were allocated for Europeans and fifteen seats were allocated to Africans. The Ubangian Economic and Social Action (AESO) won all fifteen African seats, whilst the European seats went mainly to figures linked to the Chamber of Commerce.

== Electoral system ==
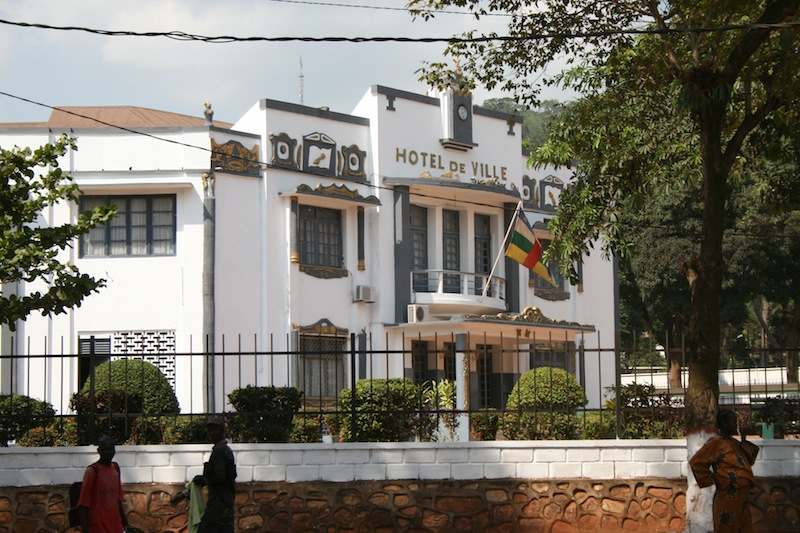
The new city hall of Bangui, where the polling stations for African voters of the territorial capital were located

Legislation passed on 5 October 1946 and a subsequent 25 October decree stipulated that elections would be held for assemblies of each of the territories of French Equatorial Africa (AEF). The first round of the election was scheduled for 15 December 1946, with a second round planned for 12 January 1947 if required. Whilst the assemblies of the other AEF territories had 30 members each, the Ubangi-Shari Representative Council had 25 members. Voters were divided into two electoral colleges: a First College consisting of citizens with French civil status (i.e. Europeans) and a Second College consisting of citizens with certain categories of personal status (i.e. Africans). Ten seats would be elected by the First College and fifteen seats would be elected by the Second College. The mandate of CROC would last five years.

The Governor of Ubangi-Shari Jean Chalvet issued an ordinance on 14 November 1946, stating that the electoral rolls of the 10 November 1946 French legislative election would be used for the CROC election but that individuals obtaining a decision of a Judge of the Peace could be added to the electoral rolls. The governor ordered that polling stations be open from 07:00 to 18:00 on election day. There would be a polling station in each subdivision, set up by an official delegated by the Head of Department. In addition, 26 additional polling stations would be set up in agricultural areas. In the Mixed Commune of Bangui, there would be three polling stations – one at the old city hall (for Europeans residing in Bangui and Bimbo Department) and two at the new city hall (for Africans residing in Bangui).

There was a single constituency for the entire territory for the First College election, which had around 3,000 registered voters. The Second College was divided into four geographic constituencies with a total of 31,124 registered voters.

Constituency	Area	Electorate	Number of seats
First Constituency (Berbérati)	Berbérati, Carnot, Nola, Boda and Bouar-Baboua subdivisions	6,947	3
Second Constituency (Bangui)	Bangui, Bimbo, M'Baïki, Damara, Bossembélé, Bossangoa, Bouca, Batangafo, Bozoum, Paoua and Bocaranga subdivisions, as well as the Mixed Commune of Bangui	12,302	5
Third Constituency (Bambari)	Fort-Sibut, Grimari, Kouango, Bambari, Alindao, Mobaye, Kembé Ippy, Bria, Bakala, Dékoa, Fort-Crampel and N'Délé subdivisions	7,536	5
Fourth Constituency (Bangassou)	Bangassou, Ouango, Rafaï, Obo-Djemah, Bakouma-Yalinga, Ouadda and Birao subdivisions	4,339	2
Source: Pénel, Journal Officiel

== Contesting parties ==
In the First College, there were three lists. The main list in the fray was the one put fielded by the 'old guard' among the French settler population. Most of the candidates on that list were linked to the Chamber of Commerce.

In the Second College election, there were lists linked to the Ubangian Economic and Social Action (AESO) in all four constituencies. AESO was led by Georges Darlan and backed by Barthélemy Boganda. In two constituencies AESO faced opposition from socialist lists; in the Second Constituency (Bangui) there was a candidate list consisting of Alphonse Doungouale (clerk), Barnabé Nzilavo (clerk), Théophile Nguini, Jean-Marie Kobozo (teacher) and Tiemoko-Diarra, and in the Third Constituency (Bambari) there was a socialist-communist list consisting of Ferdinand Bassamongou (teacher), Émile Embi-Maïdou (writer, interpreter), Antoine Gabati (writer, interpreter), Gabriel Pounaba (chief) and Augustin Bayonne (customs clerk). Nguini and Bayonne were members of the French Section of the Workers' International (SFIO) and leaders in the Ubanguian trade union movement.

== Results ==
The first round of voting was held on 15 December as scheduled. The results were declared on 28 December. Unlike the elections for the assemblies of other AEF territories, no second round of voting was held as all seats were filled in the first round of voting.

All ten seats in the First College were easily won by the Chamber of Commerce-linked list.

In the Second College election voter participation was 53.61% (3,724 voters) in the First Constituency (Berbérati), 61.26% (7,536 voters) in the Second Constituency (Bangui), 71.43% (5,383 voters) in the Third Constituency (Bamberi) and 43.49% (1,887 voters) in the Fourth Constituency (Bangassou). The AESO list candidates won all of the 15 seats allocated to the Second College. The socialist lists obtained 1,389 votes (25.8%) in the Second Constituency (Bangui) and 2,002 votes (37.19%) in the Third Constituency (Bamberi).

Party	Votes	%	Seats
First College
Chamber of Commerce-linked list			10
Two other lists			0
Second College
Ubangian Economic and Social Action			15
Socialist–Communists	2,002		0
Socialist	1,389		0
Total			25
Registered voters/turnout	31,124	–	
Source: Fandos-Rius

=== Elected members ===
Constituency		Member
First College		Robert Aubé (Director of the Compagnie Equatoriale des Mines)
First College		Charles-Jean Barbarin (architect)
First College		Christian Barnérias (plantation manager)
First College		Yves Belan (merchant, transport entrepreneur)
First College		Léon Gaume (company director)
First College		H. Jeandreau (company director)
First College		L. Levêque (Director of l'Ecole Territoriale d'Agriculture de Grimari)
First College		André-Jean-Marie Michel (reverend, missionary at Fort-Sibut)
First College		Henri Triponel (Director of Société France-Congo)
First College		Jean Lhuillier (agricultural engineer).
Second College	First Constituency (Berbérati)	Réné Gamona (chief)
Second College	First Constituency (Berbérati)	Gaston Bafatoro (chief, writer, interpreter)
Second College	First Constituency (Berbérati)	Théophile Gono (administration official)
Second College	Second Constituency (Bangui)	Bernard Condomat (plantation owner)
Second College	Second Constituency (Bangui)	Georges Darlan
Second College	Second Constituency (Bangui)	Henri Kinkolo (radio operator)
Second College	Second Constituency (Bangui)	Jacques Koppé (teacher)
Second College	Second Constituency (Bangui)	Arthur Onghaïe (accountant)
Second College	Third Constituency (Bamberi)	Benoît Mombeto (senior administration clerk)
Second College	Third Constituency (Bamberi)	Antoine Darlan (clerk)
Second College	Third Constituency (Bamberi)	Louis Martin Yetina (education supervisor)
Second College	Third Constituency (Bamberi)	Barthélemy Zinga-Piroua (clerk)
Second College	Third Constituency (Bamberi)	Pierre Enza (teacher)
Second College	Fourth Constituency (Bangassou)	Joachim Vermaud-Hetman (grandson of the Sultan of Rafaï, special agent)
Second College	Fourth Constituency (Bangassou)	Ibrahim Tello (administration official)
Source: Pénel, Sénat, Fandos-Rius & Bradshaw

== Aftermath ==
After the election Léon Gaume (of the First College) was elected chairman of the Council. In 1952 the Representative Council was replaced by a Territorial Assembly.
