= 1964 Central African presidential election =

First Central African presidential election

- 5 January 1964
- Turnout: 93.81%
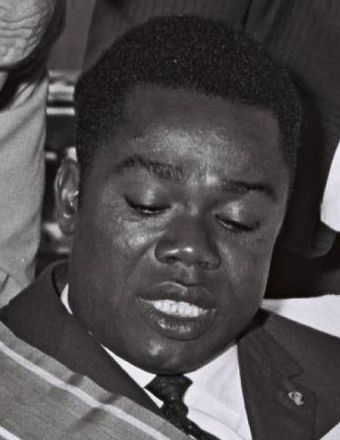
Nominee	David Dacko
Party	MESAN
Popular vote	682,607
Percentage	99.97%
- Results by prefecture (percentage for Dacko out of the total registered voters)
President of the Provisional Government before election
David Dacko
MESAN
Elected President
David Dacko
MESAN

Presidential elections were held for the first time in the Central African Republic on 5 January 1964. In December 1963 the Parliament had formally adopted a constitutional amendment that set the presidential term at seven years. The country was a one-party state at the time, with the Movement for the Social Evolution of Black Africa (MESAN) as the sole legal party. Its leader, incumbent President David Dacko, was the only candidate, and won with 99.97% of the vote and a 94% turnout.

After his victory Dacko formed new government on 11 January 1964, in which he kept positions of Head of Government and the Minister of Defense for himself, while former Minister of Justice Antoine Guimali was appointed as the new Minister of Foreign Affairs. Dacko also expressed his intention to keep close relations with France and stated that the military would participate in future infrastructure building projects. In his victory speech to Parliament, Dacko also stated that it was "completely normal for national wealth of the country to be exploited or used by the state, alone or in cooperation with private capital".

== Results ==
Candidate	Party	Votes	%
David Dacko	MESAN	682,607	99.97
Against		215	0.03
Total		682,822	100.00
Valid votes		682,822	99.42
Invalid/blank votes		4,007	0.58
Total votes		686,829	100.00
Registered voters/turnout		732,139	93.81
Source: Sternberger et al.
