= Monoblet =

- Commune
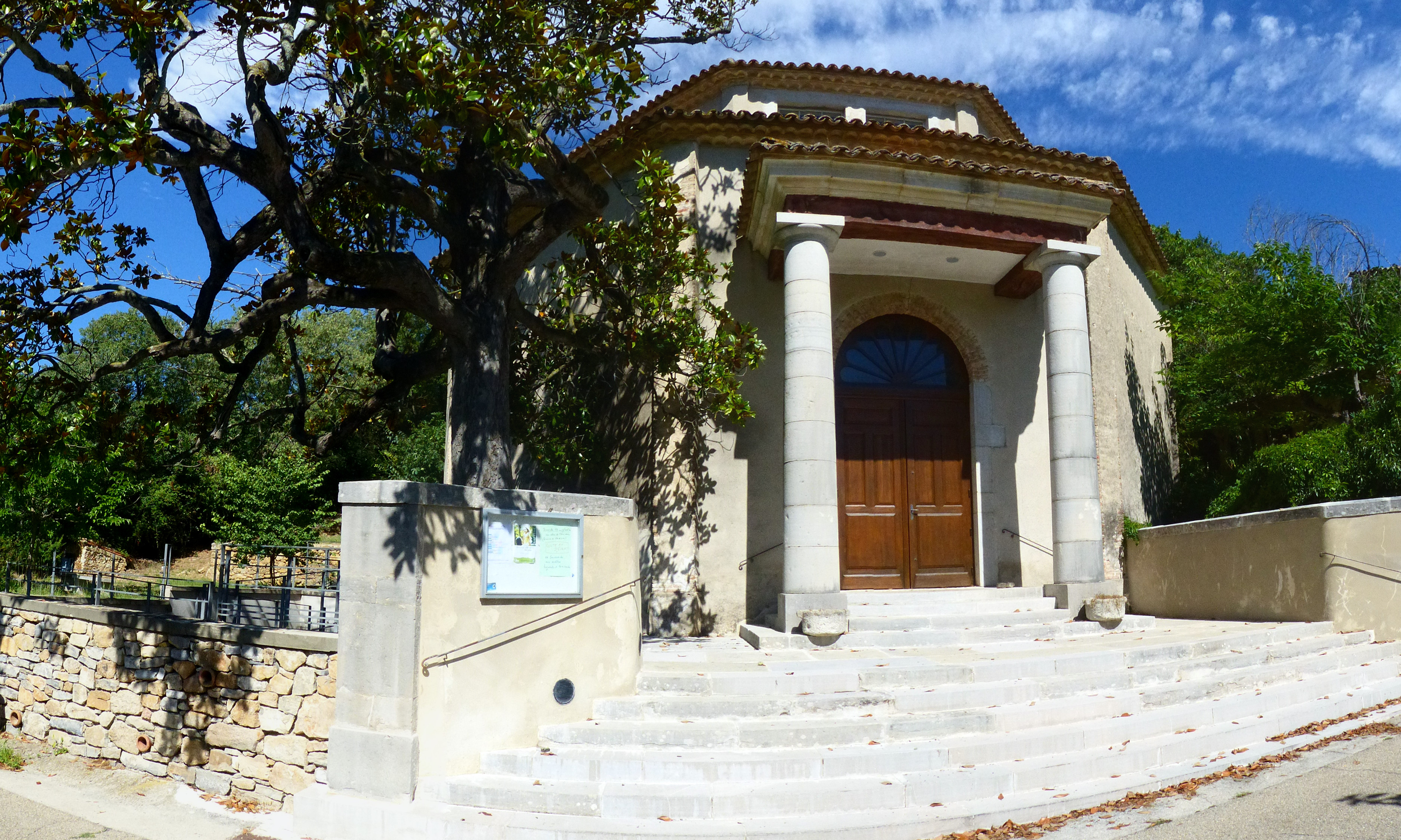
- Protestant temple of Monoblet

- Coat of arms
- Location of Monoblet
- Location within France Location within Occitanie
- Coordinates: 44°00′05″N 3°53′13″E
- Country: France
- Region: Occitania
- Department: Gard
- Arrondissement: Le Vigan
- Canton: Quissac

Government
  - Mayor (2020–2026): Philipe Castanon
- Area^{1}: 21.33 km^{2} (8.24 sq mi)
- Elevation: 350 m (1,150 ft)
- Highest elevation: 600 m (2,000 ft)
- Lowest elevation: 173 m (568 ft)
- Population (2023): 787
  - Density: 36.9/km^{2} (95.6/sq mi)
- Time zone: UTC+01:00 (CET)
  - Summer (DST): UTC+02:00 (CEST)
- INSEE/Postal code: 30172 /30170
- ^{1} French Land Register data, which excludes lakes, ponds, glaciers > 1 km^{2} (0.386 sq mi or 247 acres) and river estuaries.

Monoblet (French pronunciation: [mɔnɔblɛ]) is a commune in the Gard department in southern France.

== Population ==
Historical population
Year	Pop.	±% p.a.
1968	484	—
1975	444	−1.22%
1982	495	+1.57%
1990	542	+1.14%
1999	539	−0.06%
2007	601	+1.37%
2012	659	+1.86%
2017	728	+2.01%
2023	787	+1.31%
Source: INSEE

== See also ==
- Communes of the Gard department
