= Henri Mabille =

President of the Territorial Assembly of Ubangi-Shari
- In office April 1952 – 1957
- Preceded by: Georges Darlan (as President of the Representative Council)
- Succeeded by: Hector Riviérez

Personal details
- Born: 25 September 1902 Morija, Basutoland
- Died: 4 December 1976 (aged 74) Monoblet, France
- Profession: Missionary

Henri Mabille (25 September 1902 – 4 December 1976) was a French missionary, military officer and politician who served as the President of the Territorial Assembly of Ubangi-Shari (now the Central African Republic) from 1952 to 1957.

== Biography ==
Mabille was born on 25 September 1902 in Morija, Basutoland (modern-day Lesotho). His parents, Louis Mabille and Mary Emilia Cadier, were both French missionaries. He was also known by the Sotho name Mohato, meaning "first step, first stage". In 1919, his parents moved their four eldest children (including Henri) to France to stay with foster families, to allow the children to receive a better education. During this time, Mabille lived in Montpellier. He married Betty Kraus in 1926.

Mabille joined Paris Evangelical Missionary Society and became a pastor and missionary, serving in Gabon from 1927 to 1930. He then moved to Lesotho, joining his parents who were working for the Church of Lesotho. That year, he was named the first resident missionary of the newly-founded Mohlanapeng Mission. Mabille worked in Lesotho through 1940. He remarried to Elsie Verdier that year and moved to Lobaye, Ubangi-Shari. There, he became a pastor and worked in the lumber industry.

Mabille also was a member of the military for the Free France resistance government, starting in July 1940 with the title corporal. Mabille served as chaplain for the Middle East Brigade in French Congo starting in 1941 before later becoming chaplain of the Bataillon de marche no. 2. Mabille reached the rank of lieutenant in 1945. He later worked as a professor at a lycée in Bangui, Ubangi-Shari. He ran for office to the newly-established Territorial Assembly in 1952 and won the election as a member of the Union pour la défense des intérêts oubanguiens (UDIO) party. Backed by governor Aimé Grimald, Mabille was named president of the assembly in April 1952. He served as president of the assembly from 1952 to 1957. Afterwards, he served as a missionary in Togo from 1957 to 1967 before serving in Ivory Coast, later retiring in July 1973. He divorced from his second wife in 1955 and remarried to Josette Sire in 1963. Mabille died in Monoblet, France, on 4 November 1976, at the age of 74.
