= Central Banda language =

Banda dialect continuum of Central Africa

Central Banda
- Native to: Central African Republic, Democratic Republic of the Congo, South Sudan
- Native speakers: (580,000 cited 1984–1996)
- Language family: Niger–Congo?: Atlantic–Congo; Volta–Congo; Savanna?; Ubangian; Banda; Central; Central Banda

Language codes
- ISO 639-3: Variously: liy – Banda-Bambari bpd – Banda-Banda bqk – Banda-Mbrès bfl – Banda-Ndélé tor – Togbo-Vara Banda bjo – Mid-Southern Banda gox – Gobu kuw – Kpagua mnh – Mono nue – Ngundu
- Glottolog: cent2022

Central Banda is a dialect continuum of the Banda languages spoken by around one million people, primarily in the Central African Republic. The varieties may be mutually intelligible, especially the Mid-Southern–Gobu–Kpagua–Mono–Ngundu cluster. The other varieties are Bambari, Banda-Banda, Mbrès, Ndélé, and Togbo-Vara Banda.

== Phonology ==
The following is the Banda-Tangbago dialect:

=== Consonants ===
		Labial	Alveolar	Post- alveolar	Palatal	Velar	Labial- velar	Glottal
Plosive/ Affricate	voiceless	p	t	tʃ		k	kp	ʔ
Plosive/ Affricate	voiced	b	d	dʒ		ɡ	ɡb	
Plosive/ Affricate	prenasal	ᵐb	ⁿd	ⁿdʒ		ᵑɡ	ᵑᵐɡb	
Fricative	voiceless	f	s	ʃ				h
Fricative	voiced	v	z	ʒ				
Fricative	prenasal	ᶬv	ⁿz					
Nasal		m	n		ɲ			
Tap/Flap		ⱱ	ɾ					
Lateral			l					
Approximant					j		w	

=== Vowels ===
	Front	Central	Back
Close	i	ɨ	u
Close-mid	e	ə	o
Open-mid		ə	ɔ
Open		a	

=== Tone ===
Vowel tones are: rising /ǎ/, falling /â/, mid /ā/, low /à/, and high /á/.

== Varieties ==
Central Banda language varieties listed by Moñino (1988):

- Yakpà (also in DR Congo); Gubú (also in DR Congo); Kpágùà (also in DR Congo); Ngùndù, Bòngò, Wasá (also in South Sudan); Dùkpù (also in South Sudan) Further information:Dukpu people
- Lìndá, Jòtò, Ndòkpà, Ngápó
- Southern Gbàgà, Nbìyì, Bèrèyà, Ngòlà, Ndi, Kâ, Gbambiya, Hàì, Galabò, Vídìrì (Mvédèrè) (also in South Sudan), Bàndà-Bàndà, Burú (only in South Sudan), Wùndù (only in South Sudan), Gòv̂òrò (only in South Sudan)
- Bàndà-Ndele (Govo, Ngàjà, Gbòngó, Mbàtá, Gbàyà, Tulu, and Dabùrù groups), Bàndà-Kpaya (only in South Sudan), Ngàò, Ngbalá, Tàngbàgò (also in South Sudan), Júnguru (also in South Sudan)
- Mbere, Búkà, Mòrùbà, Sàbángà, Wádà (also in South Sudan)
- Vàrà (also in South Sudan), Tògbò (also in South Sudan)
- Yàngere

Nougayrol (1989) also lists Kɔ̀nɔ́, Manja, Ndòkà, Njùlúgù, and Sàra Dìnjo.

== Demographics ==
Demographics of Central Banda language varieties as synthesized from Moñino (1988) and Nougayrol (1989):

Language	Villages	Population	Clans	Notes	Countries
Bàndà-Bàndà					
Bàndà-Kpaya					(only in South Sudan)
Bàndà-Ndele					
Bèrèyà					
Bòngò					
Búkà					
Burú	Kúyàrà	25	Màtià	Kpata road; near Gbàyà of Krakə̀mâl; also in Bahr el Ghazal, migrated during the Zubayr era (ca. 1930)	(only in South Sudan)
Dabùrù	Ndagra	20	Kɔ̀tɔ̀, Ngòmbe, Ngulú (Kpata), Ndubu (Kpata and Ndagra)	Kpata road	
Dabùrù	Kpàtà	380		Kpata road	
Dabùrù	Miskin	30		recent satellite of Jamsinda	
Dùkpù					(also in South Sudan)
Gài	Zòkùtùɲálà		Tulu	Haraz road	
Gài	Batéle ́		Tulu	Ndélé	
Galabò					
Gbàgà	Mia Fɔ̀ndɔ̀	90	Gbə̀lè, Gùməli, Mabiri, Vidi, Yàkpà		
Gbàgà	Kàká	some			
Gbàgà	Kòv̂òngò Mia	70	Vidi, Yúdà		
Gbàgà	Ngú Sua	60	Kupi, Mbízà, Ngìàlúgù/Ngèlúgù/Njùlúgù, Vóndò		
Gbàgà	Gbàkó Lìkpà	65	Vidi		
Gbàgà	Bangora̱	155	Dámbasí/Dámbacé, Kòlògbò, làngbà		
Gbàgà	Dàngàvo	50	Kòlògbò, Yàkpà		
Gbàgà	Yambala Màgùndà	80	Mɔnɔ, Vàngà		
Gbàgà	Vátá	170	Banga, Manja, poro, Tàngbàgò, Tògbò, Yàngbà		
Gbàgà	Vavú	?			
Gbàgà	Bu Mbàlà	45, with Gbaya	Banga, Dákpá, Mòngò, Vidi		
Gbàgà	Bàmingi 1, 2	650	Gbàyà, Gùməli, Ngìàlúgù/Ngèlúgù/Njùlúgù, Sìmi/Cìmi, Vidi		
Gbàgà	Yangú Gàlá	30	Báláwà	with the Mbele	
Gbàgà	Yambala Kùdùvèlé	90	Dámbasí/Dámbacé, Kpòʔòrò, Ngìàlúgù/Ngèlúgù/Njùlúgù, Sìmi/Cìmi, Wádà, Wójò, Yúdà		
Gbàgà	Jamsinda	some		Golongoso road	
Gbambiya					
Gbàyà	Krakə̀mâ 1	210	Àbátà, Lòngbò, Tulu, Yàma	Kpata road	
Gbàyà	Krakə̀mâ 2	80	Gbòngó, Gbókóló, ɲamô		
Gbàyà	Ngú Yambrì	40	ɲamô		
Gbàyà	Bu Mbàlà		Lìwu	some families; on Gangui road, on the outskirts of Gbaga	
Gbòngó	Takara	170	7 - Danbùrù, Gbàngárà, Ndì, Ngàmbeà, Ngulú, Wɔlɔ́, Yàndè	Kpata road	
Govo	Ndélé			?	
Gòv̂òrò					(only in South Sudan)
Gubú					(also in DR Congo)
Hàì					
Jòtò					
Júnguru	Batéle 2 (Ndélé) and Idòngó			originally from Kpula, and were subjects of Zubayr	(also in South Sudan)
Kâ					
Kɔ̀nɔ́	Batéle 2 (Ndélé)			some families	
Kpágùà					(also in DR Congo)
Lìndá	Lìndá 1			Ngbɔ̀lɔ̀ngɔ̀jɔ̀	
Lìndá	Lìndá 2			Mbìà	
Lìndá	formerly Kùcù Kakú				
Lìndá	some in Ndele			Ngàò	
Manja	Batéle 1 (Ndélé cluster)	180	Bòkèngè, Bìsènge	some families in Kubu and Jamsinda (Golongoso road)	
Mbanja					(only in DR Congo)
Mbanza					(also in DR Congo)
Mbàtá	Zòkùtùɲálà	340	250	Haraz road	
Mbàtá	Ndélé			1 neighborhood	
Mbele	Yangú Doro	40			
Mbele	Yangú Líká	30	Ngìndì		
Mbele	Yangú Gàlá		Mbrua	some families living with the Muruba	
Mbele	Yambala Kùdùvèlé			some families living with the Muruba	
Mbele	Jamsinda		Mbrua	some families (on Golongoso road)	
Mùrùbà	Dungu Yangú	105	Yagua	with the Ngao	
Mùrùbà	Biʃi Ngú 1	75	Kàgárà	with the Ngapo	
Mùrùbà	Gbà Lə́bà	100	Gbanga		
Mùrùbà	Yangú Ngav̂ala	30	Gbózu Yavóró, Kàdá		
Mùrùbà	Kàgà Nzê	45	Kpèyí		
Mùrùbà	Ngú Mburu	25	Ngbə̀lɛ́lɛ́		
Mùrùbà	Mbí Ngú	45	Gbanga		
Mùrùbà	Muruba	250	Bongo	2 neighborhoods	
Mùrùbà	Sajara	130	Gàràwá, Kpèyí, Ngbalá, Sògbòrò	2 neighborhoods	
Mùrùbà	Kassaï		Gbanga, Kpèyí, Wàndè	some families	
Mùrùbà	Kro Pálíá			some families	
Mùrùbà	Jamsinda			some families	
Mùrùbà	Kubu			some families; Golongoso road	
Nbìyì					
Ndi					
Ndòkà Njùlúgù	Ádùm Mindu	250		Bangui road	
Ndòkpà					
Ngàjà	Ndélé			some families	
Ngàò	Yangú Brinjì	155	Sàngàsà		
Ngàò	Ngú Jáká	200	Kàbà	Kpata road	
Ngàò	Mbólò 1	295	Gbúlú		
Ngàò	Mbólò 2	25	Gòv̂òrò		
Ngàò	Mbólò 3	260	Lìwà		
Ngàò	Mbólò 4	60	Gbòngó		
Ngàò	Gbə̀tì ə́njo	35	Dòdòrò		
Ngàò	Kə́lə́ Bítì	145	Dòdòrò		
Ngàò	Vùngbá	55	Dòdòrò		
Ngàò	Yàfò	30	Jùmə̀là	Bangoran road	
Ngàò	Kàká	120	Ndákpá		
Ngàò	Dungu Yangú	105	Dòdòrò	with the Muruba	
Ngàò	Ngàò Ndákpá	55	Nivu (?)		
Ngàò	Kassaï			some families	
Ngàò	Kro Pálíá			some families	
Ngápó	Gbà Njípri	33	Gbàrə̀	Bangoran road	
Ngápó	Gbà Lə́bà	100	Dìgàò, Zàgò	Bangui road; with the Muruba	
Ngápó	Kassaï				
Ngápó	Ndélé				
Ngbalá	Ndyiri		Gbà Lábà	7 villages and clans	
Ngbalá	Ídòngó		Dèngè		
Ngbalá	Ngú Gua (Gbɔ̀kɔ́)				
Ngbalá	Yangú Bə̀ (Wá Ngato)				
Ngbalá	Ngú Mbrì (Wàkà)				
Ngbalá	Ngú Tàgbà (Ngèlè)				
Ngbalá	Bangora̱ Gudèrè (Mɔ̀ʔɔ́)				
Ngòlà	Ndele				
Ngòlà	Jamsinda			Golongoso road	
Ngùndù					
Sàbángà	Gbə̀tì ə́ Njo		Vəjà	Bangoran road	
Sàbángà	Yangú Gàlá			Bangui road	
Sàra Dìnjo	ɲango (Bangui road)	130		some Sàra Ngàma from Chad also joined recently	
Southern Gbàgà					
Tàngbàgò	Ngú Sua Torofay	450 total	Gbòngó, Gài	Bangoran road	(also in South Sudan)
Tàngbàgò	Tolísiò		Àngbé	Bangoran road	
Tàngbàgò	Biʃi Ngú 2		Bílí	Bangui road	
Tàngbàgò	Sa Kùmbá		Mbákàná	Bangui road	
Tàngbàgò	Dungu Yangú		Mbákàná	some families	
Tògbò					(also in South Sudan)
Tulu	Dèò	35	Gèndè, Manja, Ngàyà, Ngàò	Kpata road	
Tulu	Wî Fran	185	Kagba, Ngulú		
Tulu	Batéle 3	200	Gèndè, Kagba, Ngulú, Ngbenda, Ngàjà		
Tulu	Kro Pálíá			Ndélé	
Vàrà					(also in South Sudan)
Vídìrì (Mvédèrè)					(also in South Sudan)
Wádà	Kubu			Golongoso road; originally from Ouadda region, in Ndélé	(also in South Sudan)
Wádà	Batéle 2	Ndélé			
Wasá	Batéle 2	Ndélé		some families	(also in South Sudan)
Wùndù					(only in South Sudan)
Yakpà					(also in DR Congo)
Yàngere					

== See also ==
- Mono language
