= 1957 Ubangi-Shari Territorial Assembly election =

- 31 March 1957

All 50 seats in the Territorial Assembly 26 seats needed for a majority
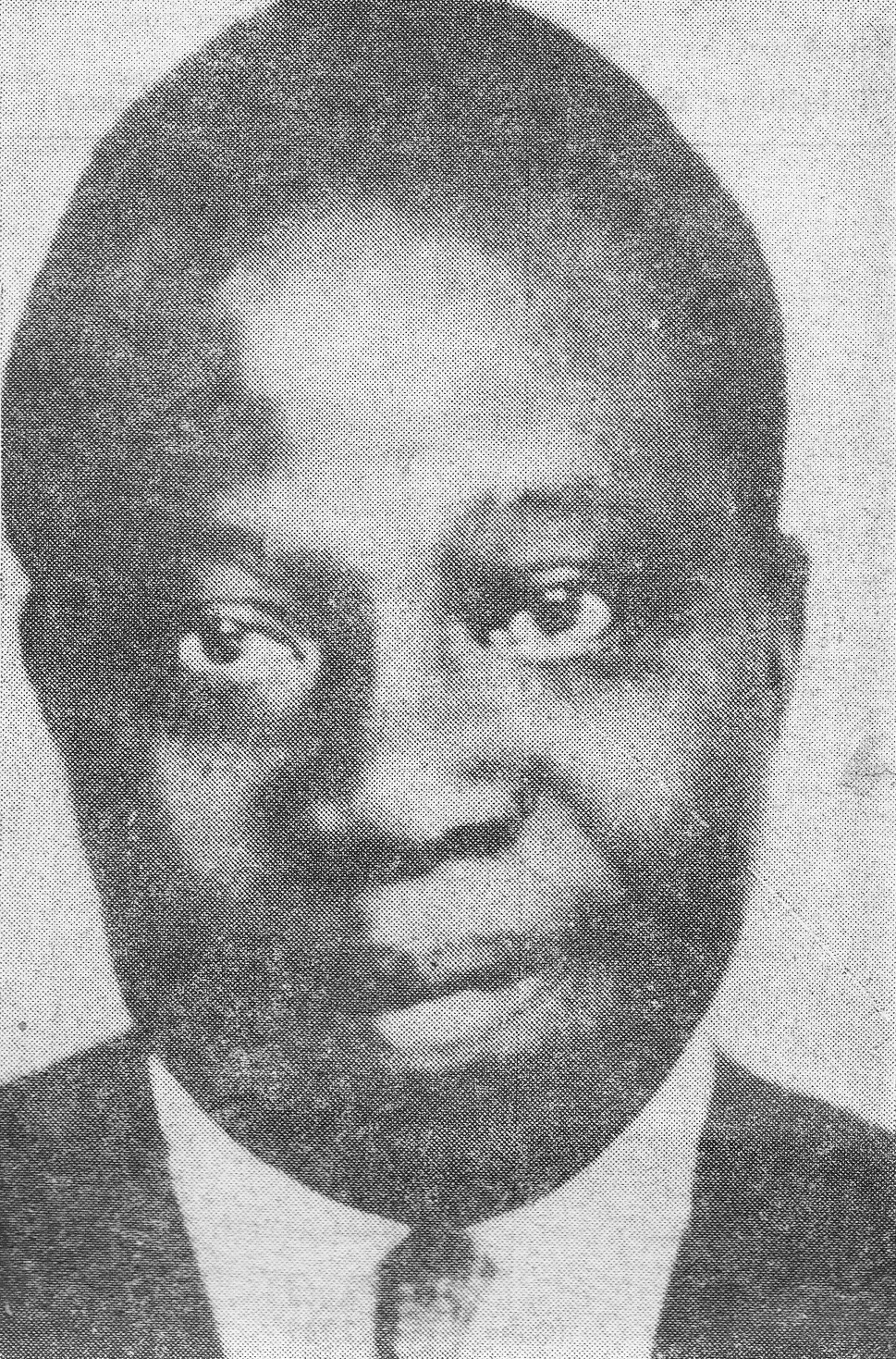
	First party
Leader	Barthélemy Boganda
Party	MESAN
Last election	17
Seats won	50
Seat change	▲33
President of the Territorial Assembly before election
Henri Mabille
Elected President of the Territorial Assembly
Barthélémy Boganda

Territorial Assembly elections were held in Ubangi-Shari on 31 March 1957. The first and second college system for giving separate seats to Europeans and Africans was scrapped, and all 50 seats elected by universal suffrage. The result was a victory for the Movement for the Social Evolution of Black Africa led by Barthélémy Boganda, which won all 50 seats.

== Results ==
Party	Votes	%	Seats
Movement for the Social Evolution of Black Africa	348,352		50
Social Evolution of Haute-Sangha			0
Haute-Sangha Independents			0
Ouaka list			0
Total			50
Total votes	365,550	–	
Registered voters/turnout	622,384	58.73	
Source: Sternberger et al.
