= 1952 Ubangi-Shari Territorial Assembly election =

- 30 March 1952

All 40 seats in the Territorial Assembly 21 seats needed for a majority
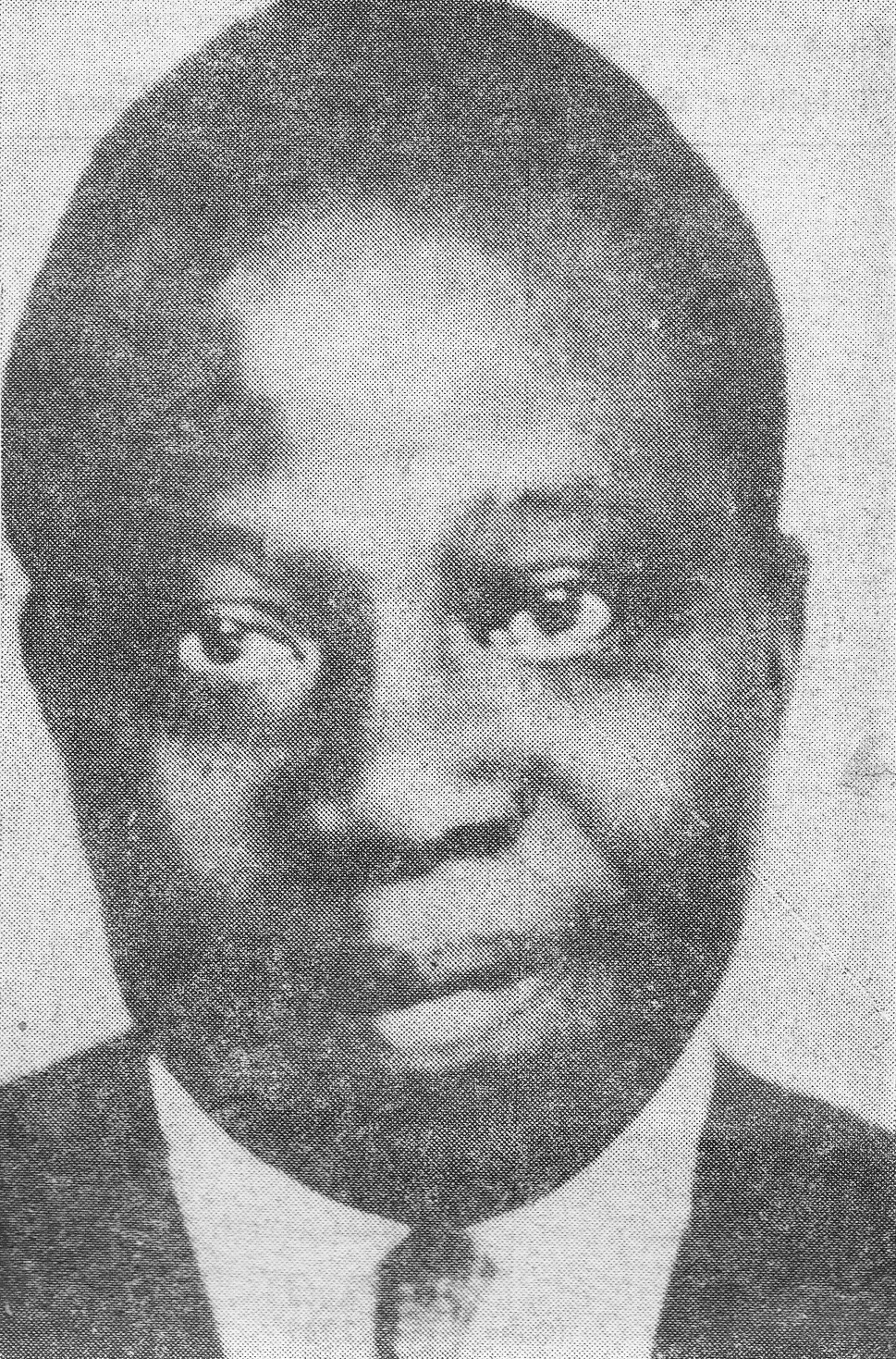
	First party	Second party	Third party
Leader	Barthélemy Boganda	Henri Mabille	Henri Mabille
Party	MESAN	UDIO	RPF
Last election	-	-	-
Seats won	17	14	8
Seat change	▲17	▲14	▲8
President of the Territorial Assembly before election
Georges Darlan
Elected President of the Territorial Assembly
Henri Mabille

Territorial Assembly elections were held in Ubangi-Shari on 30 March 1952. The result was a victory for the Movement for the Social Evolution of Black Africa (MESAN), which won 17 seats (all in the second college).

== Results ==
Party	Seats
First College
Union for the Defence of Ubangian Interests	14
Second College
Movement for the Social Evolution of Black Africa	17
Rally of the French People and independents	8
Other parties	1
Total	40
Source: Bradshaw & Fandos-Ruis

== Aftermath ==
Following the elections, Henri Mabille was elected chair of the legislature.
