= 1964 Central African parliamentary election =

Parliamentary elections were held in the Central African Republic on 15 March 1964. The country was a one-party state at the time, with the Movement for the Social Evolution of Black Africa (MESAN) as the sole legal party. As a result, it won all 60 seats in the National Assembly with 98.96% of the vote.

== Results ==
Party	Votes	%	Seats	+/–
Movement for the Social Evolution of Black Africa	596,687	98.96	60	+12
Against	6,277	1.04	–	–
Total	602,964	100.00	60	+10
Valid votes	602,964	98.27		
Invalid/blank votes	10,636	1.73		
Total votes	613,600	100.00		
Registered voters/turnout	728,981	84.17		
Source: Sternberger et al.
