= 1959 Central African parliamentary election =

Parliamentary elections were held in the Central African Republic on 5 and 29 April 1959. The result was a victory for the Movement for the Social Evolution of Black Africa (MESAN), which won all 48 contested seats on election day. Two seats were left vacant, and the vote for one seat won by MESAN was declared void. In a re-run, all three seats were won by MESAN, giving it all 50 seats in the National Assembly. Voter turnout was 56.71%.

== Results ==
Party	Votes	%	Seats	+/–
Movement for the Social Evolution of Black Africa	344,473	97.62	48	–2
African Socialist Movement	6,144	1.74	0	New
African Democratic Rally	2,249	0.64	0	New
Vacant seats			2	–
Total	352,866	100.00	50	0
Valid votes	352,866	98.55		
Invalid/blank votes	5,189	1.45		
Total votes	358,055	100.00		
Registered voters/turnout	631,391	56.71		
Source: Sternberger et al.
