= Haute-Kotto =

Prefecture of the Central African Republic

Coordinates: 7°00′N 23°00′E

- Prefecture
- Haute-Kotto in the Central African Republic

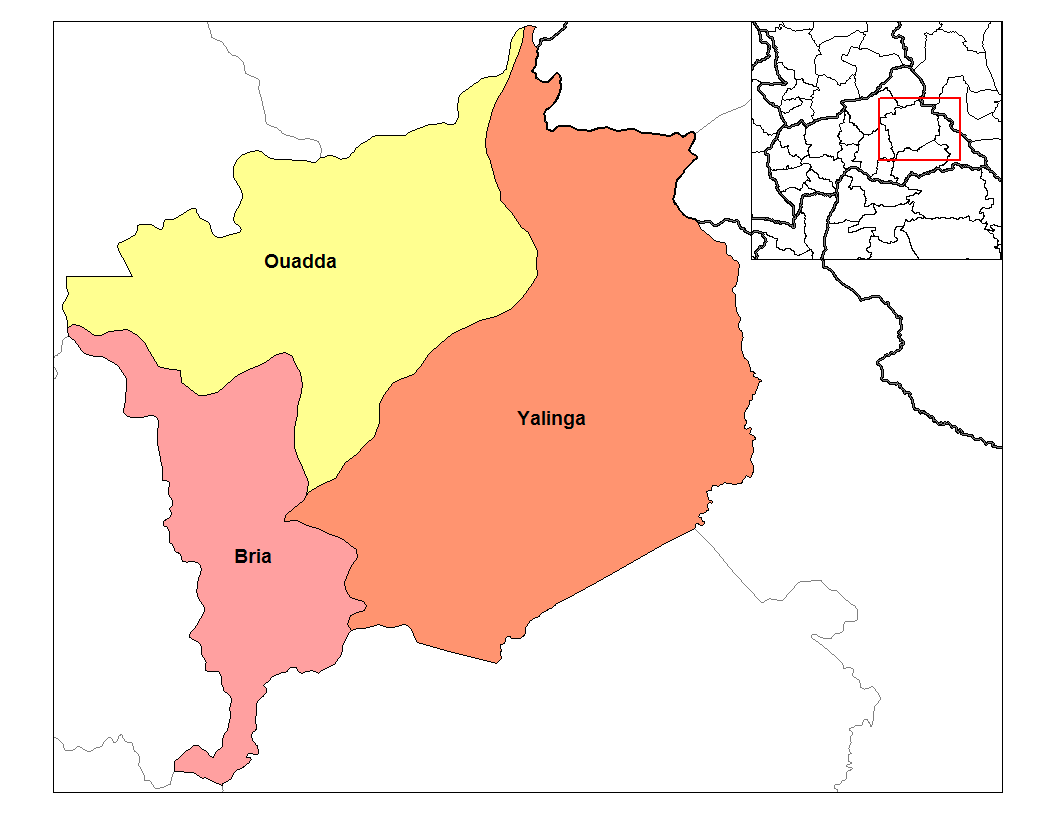
- Sub-prefectures of Haute-Kotto
- Country: Central African Republic
- Capital: Bria

Government
  - Prefect: Evariste Binguenendji

Area
  - Total: 86,650 km^{2} (33,460 sq mi)

Population (2003 census)
  - Total: 90,316
  - Estimate (2024 estimation): 144,289

Haute-Kotto ([ot ko.to], "Upper Kotto") is one of the 20 prefectures of the Central African Republic. Its capital is Bria. It is the largest prefecture in the Central African Republic. In 2024, official estimates suggest the population reached 144,289 inhabitants.

== Sub-prefectures ==
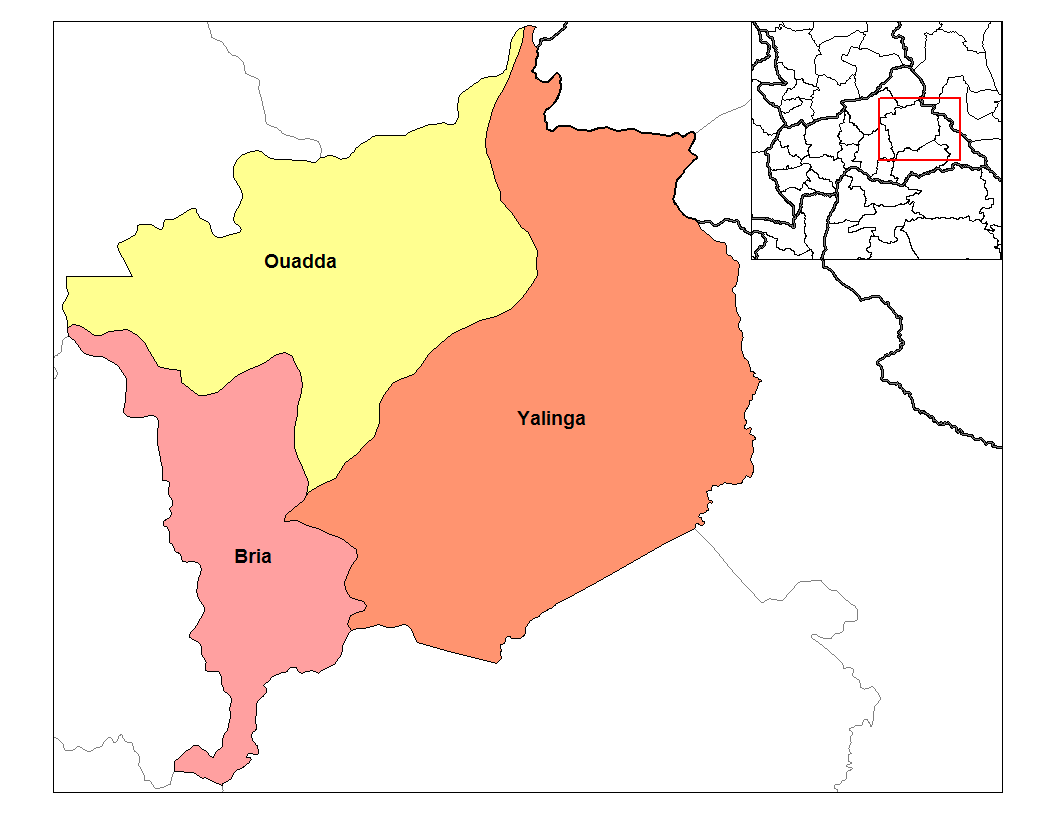
Sub-prefectures of Haute-Kotto

- Bria
- Ouadda
- Yalinga
