= Yalinga =

- Sub-Prefecture and town
- Location in the Central African Republic
- Coordinates: 6°31′N 23°15′E
- Country: Central African Republic
- Prefecture: Haute-Kotto

Government
  - Sub-Prefect: Gwladys Natacha Akani
- Time zone: UTC+1 (WAT)

Yalinga is a town and sub-prefecture in the Haute-Kotto prefecture of the central-eastern Central African Republic.

== History ==
Yalinga was founded as a French post by Lieutenant Bissey on 1 March 1912 to anticipate any further attacks from Kamoun, the last sultan of Dar al Kuti, who was resisting French annexation.

On 28 February 2010, LRA attacked Yalinga. They pillaged police station, weather station, a safari camp and kidnapped 26 people.

On 22 April 2021 Yalinga was captured from rebels of Coalition of Patriots for Change by Russian mercenaries allied with government forces.

== Transport ==
The town is served by Yalinga Airport.
