= Movement for the Social Evolution of Black Africa =

Political party in the Central African Republic

Movement for the Social Evolution of Black Africa Mouvement pour l'évolution sociale de l'Afrique noire
- Abbreviation: MESAN
- Founder: Barthélemy Boganda
- Founded: 28 September 1949 (77 years, 47 days) (original) 1990; 36 years ago (re-established)
- Dissolved: 24 November 1979 (46 years, 355 days) (first incarnation)
- Succeeded by: Central African Democratic Union (first incarnation)
- Headquarters: Bangui
- Ideology: Pan-Africanism
- Colors: Black; Blue; Red; Yellow

The Movement for the Social Evolution of Black Africa (French: Mouvement pour l'évolution sociale de l'Afrique noire, MESAN) was a political party in the Central African Republic. In its original form, it was a nationalist party that sought to affirm black humanity and advocated for the independence of Ubangi-Shari, then a French colonial territory.

== History ==
The party, which was initially intended to work as a political movement, was founded by Barthélemy Boganda in Bangui, Ubangi-Shari (later known as the Central African Republic) on 28 September 1949, to connect "all the Blacks of the world" and "to promote the political, economic and social evolution of black Africa, to break down the barriers of tribalism and racism, to replace the degrading notion of colonial subordination with the more human ones of fraternity and cooperation."

The statutes of the movement were written in April 1950, and the group's branches were set up in Ubangui, Fort Lamy and Brazzaville. The formation of MESAN did not sit well with the French territorial administration. They set up divisions of the Rassemblement du Peuple Français (French People's Party, also known as RPF) in Ubangi-Shari to oppose the MESAN. The movement also encountered resistance in French Equatorial Africa from the Rassemblement Démocratique Africain (African Democratic Rally, RDA), a political party initially geared towards Pan-Africanism that later became hostile towards efforts for African independence.

In the Territorial Assembly elections in 1957, MESAN captured 347,000 out of the total 356,000 votes cast and won every legislative seat, which led to Boganda being elected president of the Grand Council of French Equatorial Africa and vice-president of the Ubangi-Shari Government Council. Within a year, he declared the establishment of the Central African Republic and served as the country's first prime minister. MESAN continued to exist, but its role was limited. After Boganda's death in a plane crash on 29 March 1959, Étienne N'Gounio, his confidant, became the head of MESAN, but Boganda's cousin, David Dacko was named as the replacement as the Head of State in a session in April 1959. Dacko won by 39 votes against his opponent Abel Goumba's 11, despite Goumba being supported by N'Gounio. The party won every seat in the 1959 elections, with Dacko becoming the country's first president after the CAR formally received independence from France. Dacko threw out his political rivals, including former Prime Minister and Mouvement d'évolution démocratique de l'Afrique centrale (MEDAC) leader Abel Goumba, who he forced into exile in France. He secured the leadership of the party by hastily organising a party congress whilst N'Gounio was out of the capital in July 1960, therefore taking full control of the party. With all opposition parties suppressed by November 1962, Dacko declared MESAN as the official party of the state. MESAN won every seat again in the 1964 elections, whilst Dacko was re-elected as President in an unopposed election.

On 31 December 1965, General Jean-Bédel Bokassa, a cousin of both Boganda and Dacko, seized power in the CAR through a coup d'état. The next day, 1 January 1966, he proclaimed himself president, prime minister, and head of MESAN. Bokassa stayed in power for the next 13 years. In 1972, he appointed Elisabeth Domitien as vice president of the party, and three years later as prime minister, a first for any woman of an African nation. At the MESAN congress on 4 December 1976, Bokassa instituted a new constitution and declared the republic a monarchy, to be known as the Central African Empire. In September 1979, Bokassa was overthrown and Dacko once again became president of the CAR. On 24 November 1979, he abolished MESAN and replaced it with the Union Démocratique Centrafricaine, which he proclaimed as the new political party for the CAR.

The party was re-established after the return of multi-party politics in the early 1990s. In the 1993 general elections it won a single seat in the National Assembly.

The party nominated only one candidate for the 2011 elections, failing to win a seat and hasn't participated in any elections since then.

== Electoral history ==
=== Presidential elections ===
Election	Party candidate	Votes	Percentage	Result
1964	David Dacko	682,607	99.97%	Elected ✓

=== National Assembly elections ===
Election	Party leader	Votes	Percentage	Seats	+/–	Position	Government
1952	Barthélémy Boganda			17 / 40	▲17	▲2nd	Minority government
1957	Barthélémy Boganda	348,352		50 / 50	▲33	▲1st	Supermajority government
1959	David Dacko	344,473	97.62%	50 / 50	Steady	1st	Supermajority government
1964	David Dacko	596,687	98.96%	60 / 60	▲10	1st	Sole legal party
1993				1 / 85	▼59	▼13th	Opposition
2011				0 / 100	Steady		Extra-parliamentary

== Sources ==
- Kalck, P. (2005). Historical Dictionary of the Central African Republic. Lanham: Scarecrow Press. ISBN 0-8108-4913-5.
- Titley, B. (1997). Dark Age: The Political Odyssey of Emperor Bokassa. Montreal: MQUP. ISBN 0-7735-1602-6.

== See also ==
- Movement for the Social Evolution of Black Africa–Boganda
