= Cinema of the Central African Republic =

The cinema of the Central African Republic refers to the films and the film industry of Central African Republic. The country is one of the world's poorest countries and the film industry is correspondingly small. The first film made in CAR appears to have been Les enfants de la danse, a short French-made ethnographic documentary of 1945. Joseph Akouissone was the first Central African to make a film in the country, with his 1981 documentary Un homme est un homme; he was followed by the documentaries made in the 1980s by Léonie Yangba Zowe. Since then a series of ongoing conflicts and economic crises have severely limited the potential growth of film-making in the country. The first feature-length drama made in the country was Le silence de la forêt, a 2003 CAR-Gabon-Cameroon co-production about the Biaka people.

More recently, director and producer Elvis Sabin Ngaibino has feature documentaries Makongo and Le Fardeau (The Burden) screened at international film festivals.

== List of Central African films ==
This is a sortable list of films produced in the CAR.

Year	Title	Director	Genre	Notes
1958	The Roots of Heaven (film)	John Huston	Documentary short	American
1960	boganda films	boganda	Documentary short	English
1970	Les enfants de la danse	Geneviève Dournon & Arom Simha	Documentary short	English title: Children of the Dance
1978	Safrana or Freedom of Speech	Joseph Akouissone, Med Hondo	Documentary short	
1981	Un homme est un homme	Joseph Akouissone	Documentary short	English title: A Man is a Man
1985	Lengue	Léonie Yangba Zowe	Documentary short	
1985	Nzale	Léonie Yangba Zowe	Documentary short	
1985	Yangba bolo	Léonie Yangba Zowe	Documentary short	
1987	Paroles de sages	Léonie Yangba Zowe	Documentary short	English title: Words of Sages
1990	Echoes from a Sombre Empire	Werner Herzog	Documentary	English title: Echoes From a Sombre Empire
1992	Bogande	Bogande		
1993	Un Pygmée dans la baignoire	Léandre-Alain Baker		Broadcast: Canal Plus, TV5, CFI Festival: Montreal, Fespaco, Amiens...
1993	documentary Diogène à	Léandre-Alain Baker	Drama	
1995	Tatie pouvait vivre. Video, color,	Opportune Aymadji	Drama	
1996	Colis postal (1996)	Léandre-Alain Baker	Documentary short	
1998	Au bout du couloir	Léandre-Alain Baker	Documentary short	Festivals: Montreal, Amiens.
2003	Le silence de la forêt	Bassek Ba Kobhio & Didier Ouénangaré	Drama	English title: The Silence of the Forest
2004	Les Oranges de Belleville	Léandre-Alain Baker	Documentary short	
2005	Paris la métisse	Léandre-Alain Baker	Documentary short	
2006	Tchicaya U’Tamsi	Léandre-Alain Baker	Drama	
2007	Ramata (film)	Léandre-Alain Baker	Documentary short	
2008	35 Shots of Rum	Claire Denis	Documentary short	
2009	World of Witchcraft	Daniel Bogado	Documentary short	
2009	Saignantes (Les)	Jean-Pierre Bekolo	Documentary short	
2009	Sofie la Banguisoise (Series) 2009	Sylviane Gboulou Mbapondo	Documentary short	
2010	A Screaming Man	Mahamat Saleh Haroun	Documentary short	
2010	White Material	Claire Denis Marie NDiaye	Documentary short	
2011	Oka!	Lavinia Currier	Drama	American drama filmed partly in CAR
2011	The Ambassador (2011 film)	Mads Brügger	Documentary short	American
2011	Love and Bruises	Lou Ye	Documentary short	
2012	magleorie kolisso	magleorie kolisso	Documentary short	
2012	Georgette Florence Koyt	Georgette Florence Koyt-Deballé Tchicaya U’Tamsi	Documentary short	
2013	Aya of Yop City	Marguerite Abouet Clément Oubrerie	Documentary short	
2014	chimende Loseba	freed yapandee	Documentary short	
2015	freed yapandee	freed yapandee	Documentary short	
2016	Nascent	Lindsay Branham & Jon Kasbe	Documentary short	
2017	Sarafina	Sarafina	Documentary short	
2017	Ozagin	Dany Grepande	Drama	
2017	Chambre 1	Leila Thiam	Documentary short	
2018	Elephant Path: Njaia Njoku	Todd McGrain	Documentary	
2018	Yé mbi	Yémbi, Par Hermann LINGANGUE	Documentary short	
2019	demain je pare en	Yann harris Dawro	Drama	
2019	Camille	Boris Lojkine	Documentary short	

== Films made ==
La Couture de Paris,

short film, 1995. Distribution: CFI, Canal + Horizon, TV5, Festivals: Fespaco, Amiens, Montréal, Namur.

Diogenes to Brazzaville,

Documentary film, 2004. Portrait of the Congolese writer Sony Labou Tansi. Broadcast: TV 10, CFI, Canal + Horizon, TV5, Festivals: Vue d'Afrique Montreal, Amiens, Fespaco, Namur, Milan, Lisbon.

Tchicaya, the little leaf that sings its country,

Documentary film, 2004. Portrait of the Congolese writer Tchicaya U'Tamsi. Diffusion: Images Plus, CFI, Canal + Horizon, Festivals: Fespaco, Amiens.

== Central African Republic film directors ==
- Léandre-Alain Baker
- Didier Ouénangaré
- Elvis Sabin Ngaibino
- Léonie Yangba Zowe
- Mamadou Mahmoud N'Dongo
- Joseph Akouissone
- Maurice Alezra
- Béatrice Boffety
- Patrick Demeester
- Georges Durupt
- Micheline Durupt
- Bernard Guenau
- Gérard Guérin
- Evane Hanska
- Charles Lescaut
- Charles Leaut
- Chantal Monstile
- Denis Parrichon
- Moussa Ndongo
- Sylviane Gboulou Mbapondo
- Leila Thiam
- Monsieur Habib
- Fiacre Bindala
- Camille Lepage
- Andre kolingbe
- Bocha Sango
- Mokonga Quenitin
- Alex Ballu
- Heritter Acteur
- Djimon Hounsou
- Mbéni Yé by Sparrow
- Étienne Goyémidé
- droite Eric Sabe,
- Ida Mabaya,
- lesultan de dekoa
- Hippolyte Donossio
- Ousna Ousnabee
- NGAISSIO Abdoul Karim
- ASSANAS TEKATA Simon Patrick
- LAMINE Odilon Alias Cheguevara
- Andy melo
- kailou Sylla
- Nicna Meunrisse
- Boris Lojkine
- Didier Flort Ouén
- Leger Serge kokpakpa
- Jm wolf Gang
- lzy Orphelin
- Brown Goh
- Eric Yelemou
- Lassa Kossangue
- Bande Originale
- Hurel BenInga

== See also ==
- Culture of the Central African Republic
- List of African films
