= Njoku =

Njoku is a surname of Igbo origin. The name is associated with true born sons of wealthy yam farmers in pre-colonial Igbo society. It may refer to:

People

- Augustine Njoku Obi, Nigerian professor and researcher
- David Njoku, American football player
- Eni Njoku, Nigerian educator and botanist
- Eni G. Njoku, Nigerian-American scientist
- Gideon Njoku, Nigerian footballer and coach
- Jacob Njoku, Nigerian footballer
- Jamie Njoku-Goodwin, British political aide
- Jason Njoku, British-Nigerian businessman
- Jude Njoku, Nigerian professor
- Kingsley Njoku, Nigerian footballer
- Mary Njoku, Nigerian actress
- Ndave David Njoku, Nigerian film director and producer
- Nnenna Njoku, Nigerian athlete
- Philip Njoku, Nigerian footballer
- Placid Njoku, Nigerian politician
- Raymond Njoku, Nigerian politician
- Ugo Njoku, Nigerian footballer
- Ugochukwu Cyprian Njoku, Nigerian-Canadian Lawyer
- William Njoku, Ghanaian-Canadian basketball player

Mythological Figures

- Ahia Njoku, goddess in Igbo mythology
- Njoku Ji, Igbo yam deity

Other

- Elephant Path: Njaia Njoku, 2018 Central African documentary film
