= Igbo calendar =

Traditional calendar of the Igbo

The Igbo calendar (Igbo: Ọ̀gụ́àfọ̀ Ị̀gbò) is the traditional calendar system of the Igbo people from present-day Nigeria. The calendar has 13 months in a year (Afọ), 7 weeks in a month (Ọnwa), and 4 days of Igbo market days (Eke, Orie, Afọ, and Nkwọ) in a week (Izu) plus an extra day at the end of the year, in the last month. The name of these months was reported by Onwuejeogwu (1981).

Although worship and spirit honoring were a very big part in the creation and development of the Igbo calendar system, commerce also played a major role in creating the Igbo calendar. This was emphasized in Igbo mythology itself. An example of this is the Igbo market days (ubochi Ahia) of which each community has a day assigned to open its markets Example :(Ahia Orie) which is the second day market in Igbo land, this way the Igbo calendar is still in use.

Some Igbo communities have tried to adjust the thirteen month calendar to twelve months, in line with the Gregorian calendar, but it has not been easy.

The calendar is neither universal nor synchronized, so various groups will be at different stages of the week, or even year. Nonetheless, the four-eight day cycle serves to synchronize the inter-village market days, and substantial parts (for example the Kingdom of Nri) do share the same year-start.

== Market days ==
Igbos generally have four market days, namely: Eke, Orie, Afọ and Nkwọ. The market days according to the Igbo calendar follow each other sequentially as shown below:

1. Eke
2. Orie
3. Afọ
4. Nkwọ

In various parts of Igboland, each community has a market named after the aforementioned four market days, e.g., Eke market, Afọ market.

== System ==
In the traditional Igbo calendar, a week (Igbo: Izu) has 4 days (Igbo: Ubochi) (Eke, Orie, Afọ, Nkwọ), seven weeks make one month (Igbo: Ọnwa), a month has 28 days and there are 13 months a year. In the last month, an extra day is added (an intercalary day). The traditional time keepers in Igboland are the priests or Dibia.

No.	Months (Ọnwa)	Gregorian equivalent
1	Ọnwa Mbụ	(February–March)
2	Ọnwa Abụọ	(March–April)
3	Ọnwa Ife Eke	(April–May)
4	Ọnwa Anọ	(May–June)
5	Ọnwa Agwụ	(June–July)
6	Ọnwa Ifejiọkụ	(July–August)
7	Ọnwa Alọm Chi	(August to early September)
8	Ọnwa Ilọ Mmụọ	(Late September)
9	Ọnwa Ana	(October)
10	Ọnwa Okike	(Early November)
11	Ọnwa Ajana	(Late November)
12	Ọnwa Ede Ajana	(Late November to December)
13	Ọnwa Ụzọ Alụsị	(January to early February)

The days correspond to the four cardinal points, Afọ corresponds to north, Nkwọ to south, Eke to east, and Orie to west. These spirits, who were fishmongers, were created by Chineke (Faith and Destiny) in order to establish a social system throughout Igboland.

While there are four days, they come in alternate cycles of "major" and "minor", giving a longer eight day cycle.

An example of a month: Ọnwa Mbụ

Eke	Orie	Afọ	Nkwọ
		1	2
3	4	5	6
7	8	9	10
11	12	13	14
15	16	17	18
19	20	21	22
23	24	25	26
27	28		

== Use ==
The Igbo calendar is not universal, and is described as "not something written down and followed ... rather it is observed in the mind of the people."

=== Naming after dates ===
Newborn babies are sometimes named after the day they were born on, though this is no longer commonly used. Names such as Mgbeke (maiden [born] on the day of Eke), Mgborie (maiden [born] on the Orie day), and so on were common among the Igbo people. For males Mgbo is replaced by Oko (Igbo: Male child [of]) or Nwa (Igbo: Child [of]). An example of this is Nwankwo Kanu, a popular footballer.

== Months and meanings ==
The following months are in reference to the Nri-Igbo calendar of the Nri kingdom which may differ from other Igbo calendars in terms of naming, rituals, and ceremonies surrounding the months.

=== Ọnwa Mbụ ===
The first month starts from the third week of February making it the Igbo new year. The Nri-Igbo calendar year corresponding to the Gregorian year of 2012 was initially slated to begin with the annual year-counting festival known as Igu Aro on 18 February (an Nkwọ day on the third week of February). The Igu Aro festival which was held in March marked the lunar year as the 1013th recorded year of the Nri calendar.

=== Ọnwa Abụọ ===
This month is dedicated to cleaning and farming.

=== Ọnwa Ife Eke ===
Is described as the fasting period, usually known as “Ugani” in Igbo meaning 'hunger period'. It is the period in which all must fast in sacrificial harmony to the goddess Ani of the Earth. Many communities host competitive wrestling events in this month as it is dedicated to finding one's Ikenga through conquering personal and communal struggle.

=== Ọnwa Anọ ===
Ọnwa Anọ is when the planting of seed yams/yam seeds start. In many communities this is the month of the Ekeleke dance festival which emphasizes optimism, sustaining your belief in God through hardships and the coming of better days.

=== Ọnwa Agwụ ===
Ịgọchi na mmanwụ come out in this month which are adult masquerades. Ọnwa Agwu is the traditional start of the year. The Alusi Agwu, after which the month is named, is venerated by the Dibia (priests), by whom Agwu is specifically worshipped, in this month.

=== Ọnwa Ifejiọkụ ===
This month is dedicated to the yam deity ifejioku and Njoku Ji and yam rituals are performed in this month for the New Yam Festival.

=== Ọnwa Alọm Chi ===
This month sees the harvesting of the yam. This month is also a time of prayer and meditation for women. The Alom Chi is a shrine or memorial a woman builds in honor of her ancestors. This month is dedicated to reconnecting with the ancestors by breaking kola and holding communion with them. Onwa Alom Chi is also dedicated to venerating mothers and motherhood, honoring womenhood, remembering ones 'first mother' (the woman which all of humanity and creation comes from) as well as connecting one's children, including those that are yet to be born.

=== Ọnwa Ilo Mmụọ ===
A festival called Önwa Asatọ (Igbo: Eighth Month) is held in this month.

=== Ọnwa Ana ===
Ana (or Ala) is the Igbo earth goddess and rituals for this deity commence in this month, hence it is named after her.

=== Ọnwa Okike ===
Okike ritual takes place in this month.

=== Ọnwa Ajana ===
Okike ritual also takes place in Ọnwa Ajana.

=== Ọnwa Ede Ajana ===
Ritual Ends

=== Ọnwa Ụzọ Alụsị ===
The last month sees the offering to the Alusi.

== Festivals ==
Two major festivals are the new year festival (Ịgụ Arọ), due around 18 February, the planting season when the king, the Eze Nri in the Nri area, tells the Igbo to go and sow their seed after the next rainfall, and the Harvest festival (Emume Ọnwa-asatọ) in the eighth month.

The Nri-Igbo yearly counting festival known as Ịgụ Arọ marked 10 March 2012 as the beginning of the 1,013th year of the Nri calendar. The festival was delayed due to other events.

Imöka is celebrated on the 20th day of the second month.

== See also ==
- Akan calendar
- Yoruba calendar
- Efik calendar
