= Osuji =

- Language: Igbo

Origin
- Meaning: Dedicated to the yam god
- Region of origin: Southeast Nigeria

Osuji // is a Igbo surname that means “dedicated to the yam god”. It is mostly found in Imo State. Yam is and has historically been the sacred, staple crop of the Igbo, with numerous patron deities—like Ahia Njoku and Njoku Ji—and festivals in its veneration. Notable people with the surname include:

- Bede Osuji (born 1996), Nigerian footballer
- Chinedum Osuji (born 1976), Trinidadian researcher and taekwondo practitioner
- Fabian Osuji (1942–2024), Nigerian politician
- Justin Osuji, alias Sonny J Mason, Scottish singer
- Rose Osuji (born 1947), Nigerian physicist
- Vince Osuji (born 2006), Nigerian footballer
- Wilfred Osuji (born 1990), Nigerian footballer
