= Abasse Ndione =

Senegalese author and nurse (1946–2024)

- Born: 16 December 1946; Bargny, French Senegal, French West Africa
- Died: 25 January 2024 (aged 77)
- Occupation: Author
- Known for: Ramata

Abasse Ndione (16 December 1946 – 25 January 2024) was a Senegalese author and nurse.

== Life and career ==
Ndione was born 16 December 1946 in the village of Bargny, close to Dakar, the son of a shopkeeper. He attended the local Koranic school at first; then, with pressure from his father, he and his brother attended French school. He studied nursing and got his first job in 1966, staying in this profession until his retirement. In 1968 he married Meriem, a teacher; they had seven children. He lived in Rufisque, a fishing town about 20 kilometers from Dakar. The New African said of him, "It would be safe to bet that Abasse Ndione has seldom earned more than a pittance from any publisher. So he has made his living working full time as a hospital nurse." Ndione died on 25 January 2024, at the age of 77.

== Work ==
It took eight years for Ndione's first novel, La Vie en spirale (Life in a Spiral), to be released in Senegal. It discusses the use and trafficking of "yamba" (marijuana) by unemployed youth, police officers and whites in Senegal, discussing yamba as a social metaphor. It caused a stir and attracted the attention of the Parisian publishing house Éditions Gallimard, who published it in 1998. It is now studied in Senegal schools.

Ndione's novel Ramata (2000) was also translated into Spanish. It tells of a beautiful and wealthy Senegalese woman who, aged 50, discovers the pleasures of the flesh in the arms of a little thug 25 years younger, causing her life to unravel. Ramata was the basis for a 2007 feature-length film directed by Léandre-Alain Baker, starring the model Katoucha Niane in the title role. Ndione's last work, the novella Mbëke mi, describes the emigration of young Senegalese in pirogues trying to reach the Canary Islands and Europe. His novels show that Ndione thought first in Wolof and then transcribed into French.

== Bibliography ==
A selective list, with dates for publication in France:

- 1984 – La Vie en spirale, first part from the presses in 1984 in Senegal
- 1988 – La Vie en spirale II from Nouvelles Editions Africaines, second part
- 1998 – La Vie en spirale, Gallimard
- 2000 – Ramata, Gallimard
- 2008 – Mbëkë mi, Gallimard
