= Top Model (disambiguation) =

Top Model is a fashion-themed reality television show format.

Top Model may also refer to:

== Versions of the reality television show ==
- Top Model (French TV series)
- Top Model (Polish TV series)
- Top Model (Scandinavian TV series)

== Other uses ==
- Top Model (Brazilian TV series), a Brazilian telenovela
- La Mouette Top Model, a French hang glider design

== See also ==
- Model (person), a person who models clothing, jewelry, etc.
- Supermodel, a highly paid fashion model
