= University of Bangui =

University in Bangui, Central African Republic

Coordinates: 4.37564°N 18.56335°E

- Université de Bangui
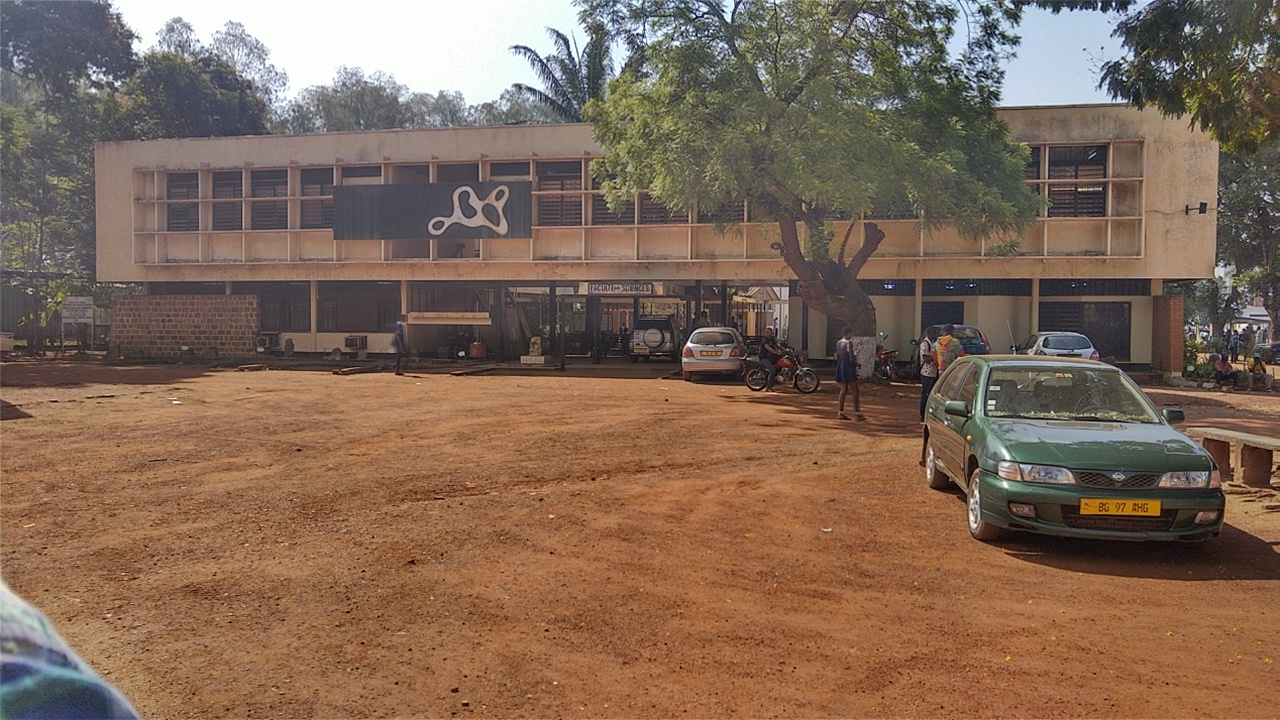
- University of Bangui in 2023
- Type: Public
- Established: 1969; 57 years ago
- Affiliations: AUF, CRUFAOCI
- Rector: Georgette Florence Koyt Deballé
- Students: ~6,500
- Location: Bangui, Central African Republic
Colors
Blue, white, green, yellow and red
- Website: univ-bangui.cf

The University of Bangui (French: Université de Bangui) is a public university located in Bangui, Central African Republic.

== History ==
Before independence in Oubangui-Chari (later to be called the Central African Republic), most students going on to higher education headed for universities in France. After gaining independence in 1958, the Central African Republic took part in the Foundation for Higher Education in Central Africa (FESAC). The FESAC encompassed several former French colonies, each with schools or institutes with a specific focus. Within the FESAC, the Central African Republic had the agricultural institute.

The FESAC began to come apart in the late 1960s, so on November 12, 1969, the University of Bangui was created by government ordinance. The University of Bangui expanded the focus of study on agriculture to include scientific research, law, economics, rural development and liberal arts.

== Student enrollment ==
At the beginning of the 2000–01 academic year, the higher education sector consisted of only two public institutions, the University of Bangui and the National School of Administration and Judiciary (ENAM), and one private school, the International Preparatory College (College Preparatoire International, CPI). Student enrollment in 1998–99 was 5,486, which represented an increase of nearly 80% in three decades. Today, approximately 6,500 students are enrolled in the post-secondary system.

Enrollment figures indicate that the number of students preparing for the mathematics and physical sciences baccalaureate degrees have significantly increased. At the University of Bangui the proportion of students in mathematics and sciences jumped to 35% in 2000, compared with 8% in 1981.

The percentage of female students remains very low. It varies from 3% in science to 16% in law and the human sciences. Young women are facing strong pressures in the society to leave school and take up their traditional role of housekeepers. Ethnic minorities, such as Pygmies and Bororo, are poorly represented in higher education.

== Notable staff ==
- Gaston Mandata N'Guérékata (1953–present), former vice-chancellor
- Faustin-Archange Touadéra (1957–present), former vice-chancellor
- Sylvie Ngouadakpa
- Ginette Amara
- Laurent Gomina-Pampali
- Aboubakar Moukadas Nouré

== See also ==
- Euclid Consortium - UBRC's international extension
