= Ouandago =

- Location in Central African Republic
- Coordinates: 7°15′24″N 18°50′43″E
- Country: Central African Republic
- Prefecture: Nana-Grebizi
- Sub-prefecture: Kaga Bandoro
- Commune: Nana-Outa

Ouandago is a market town located in Nana-Grébizi Prefecture, Central African Republic.

== History ==
=== Central African Republic Bush War ===
At midnight of 28 June 2006, twenty zaraguinas raided Ouandago and looted the market. Two months later, on 19 and 20 August, zaraguinas attacked Ouandago again and kidnapped nine people. The abductees were forced to reveal the location where they kept the animals. Afterward, they killed all the hostages and stole cows.

These two incidents led the town residents to ask APRD rebels to tackle the insecurity problem as they distrusted the government, which was unable to provide security. APRD sent hundreds of its fighters to Ouandago and they were able to drive away the bandit and recover nine villagers' bodies. Since then, Ouandago was heavily under the control of APRD.

On 5 October 2006, FACA attacked Ouandago to capture the town from APRD. The battle lasted for two hours and APRD withdrew from Ouandago. Subsequently, FACA called for reinforcement and soon after, the Presidential Guard arrived in Ouandago. The presidential guard forces arrested five civilians and two days later, they executed the detainees at the health center. In addition, FACA and Presidential Guard pillaged and torched houses, warehouses, shops, and a local gendarmerie post. They established a base in Ouandago and stayed there until 17 October.

=== Central African Republic Civil War (2012-present) ===
On 19 June 2016, a clash between two ex-Seleka groups occurred in Ouandago over a dispute over sharing stolen oxen. In February 2022, MINUSCA conducted a security operation in Ouandago to end auto-defense group harassment. They arrested 11 militias.

== Economy ==
There is one market in the town.

== Education ==
The town has one school.

== Healthcare ==
Ouandago has one health center. From July to September 2013, Seleka occupied the health center and used it as a base.

== Notable residents ==
- Ginette Amara, Central African academician and politician.

== Bibliography ==
- HRW, HRW (18 April 2008). State of Anarchy: Rebellion and Abuses against Civilians (PDF) (Report). Human Rights Watch.
