= Elvis Sabin Ngaibino =

Central African Republic documentarian

- Born: 26 July 1990 (age 36); Bangui
- Citizenship: Central African Republic
- Occupations: Director, Writer, Actor, Screenwriter

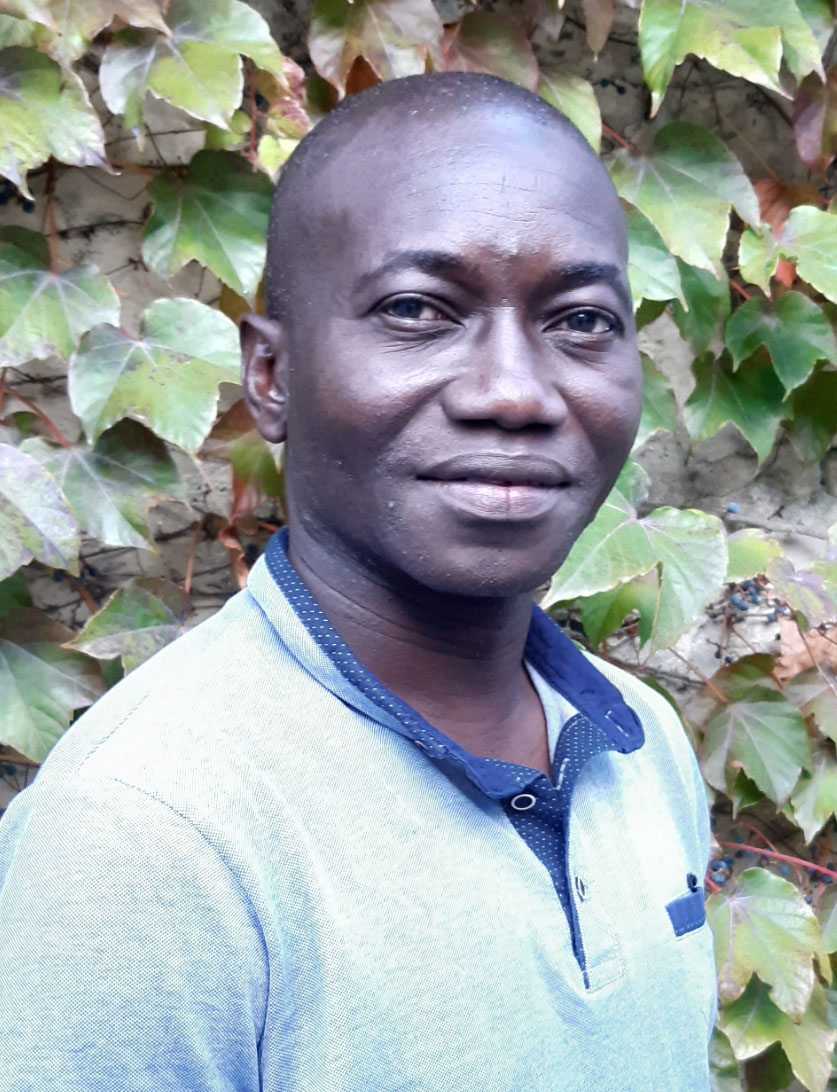
Elvis Sabin Ngaibino.jpg

Elvis Sabin Ngaibino (born 1985) is a documentary filmmaker from the Central African Republic (CAR), credited with among the first feature-length documentary films of the cinema of the Central African Republic, and which have been shown and received awards at prestigious international film festivals.

== Early life and education ==
Ngaibino graduated from University of Bangui with degrees in geology. He was one of the co-founders Academy of Central African Filmmakers in 2012 in Bangui. He participated in the first Ateliers Varan workshop in Bangui in 2017, which allowed him to direct the documentary short Docta Jefferson, about a health worker in Bangui.

== Career ==
In 2019, Ngaibino co-created the first film production company in the Central African Republic. Ngaibino's documentary Makongo, about the Aka indigenous peoples in CAR, showed at awarded at the Cinéma du Réel 2020, IDFA 2020, and the Venice Film Festival. A reviewer notes about the film, "Ngaïbino's perspective offers a window into the tense social and economic circumstances which heighten the significance and potential impact of both the harvest and education. . .centering on the minority status and difficult conditions of the Aka in the Central African Republic." The film won the Prix International de la Scam (the second award of the Festival) at Cinéma du Réel.

The film on which Ngaibino served as producer Nous, etudiants (We, Students) world premiered at the 2022 Berlinale.

His most recent film, Le Fardeau (The Burden), a documentary about a couple living with HIV/AIDS in CAR, premiered at the 2023 IDFA. According to one review of the film, "Ngaibino Sabin, one of his generation's stand-out filmmakers, brings the couple's intimate struggles to life as they alternate between fear and shame on the one hand and a desperate hope of being supernaturally healed on the other."

Ngaibino's next project, according to him, will focus on "the anti-French sentiment in French-speaking Africa, and the anti-Western sentiment in contrast with Russian influence in Africa."

== Filmography ==
- Docta Jefferson (2017), director, short documentary
- Makongo (also known as Caterpillars) (2020), director, feature documentary
- Nous, etudiants (2020), producer, feature documentary
- Le Fardeau (The Burden) (2024), director, feature documentary
