= Alizée Gaillard =

Haitian-Swiss fashion model

- Born: April 28, 1985 (age 41); Geneva, Switzerland
- Spouse: Darrin Charles (m. 2013; div. 2018)
- Modeling information
- Height: 1.78 m (5 ft 10 in)
- Hair color: Brown
- Eye color: Green
- Website: www.alizee-gaillard.com

Alizée Gaillard (born 28 April 1985), sometimes credited as Alizée Sorel, is a Haitian-Swiss fashion model and actress. Gaillard began her modeling career in 2005, after winning season one of the French edition of America's Next Top Model. Afterwards, she signed to Elite Model Management.

== Early life and family ==
Gaillard was born to a Haitian father and a Swiss mother in Geneva. Gaillard moved to Pétion-Ville in Haiti when she was two months old, and spent her early childhood there until the age of eight, when she moved back to Switzerland with her family.

Gaillard lives in Los Angeles. On 15 December 2013, she married American actor Darrin Charles in a ceremony in Los Angeles. They divorced in 2018. In 2020, she gave birth to a daughter named Alya Star, with her partner Jorge David Gafter. Gaillard became an American citizen in March 2021.

== Career ==
In 2005, she won the first cycle of France's Next Top Model, promoted by channel M6. She then worked as a model in Paris, before moving to London and signing with Elite Model Management. She has worked for brands such as Alexander McQueen, L’Oréal, Louis Vuitton, and Prada.

In 2013, Gaillard moved to Los Angeles to pursue an acting and modelling career. Her first movie role was in the independent film The Morning After, in 2015. In 2016, she appeared in three episodes of the soap opera The Bold and The Beautiful and had an uncredited cameo in the movie Nocturnal Animals.

In 2021, Gaillard played the role of a French woman in the Apple TV+ series Acapulco.
