= Hope Waddell Training Institution =

Colonial school in Calabar, Cross River State, Nigeria

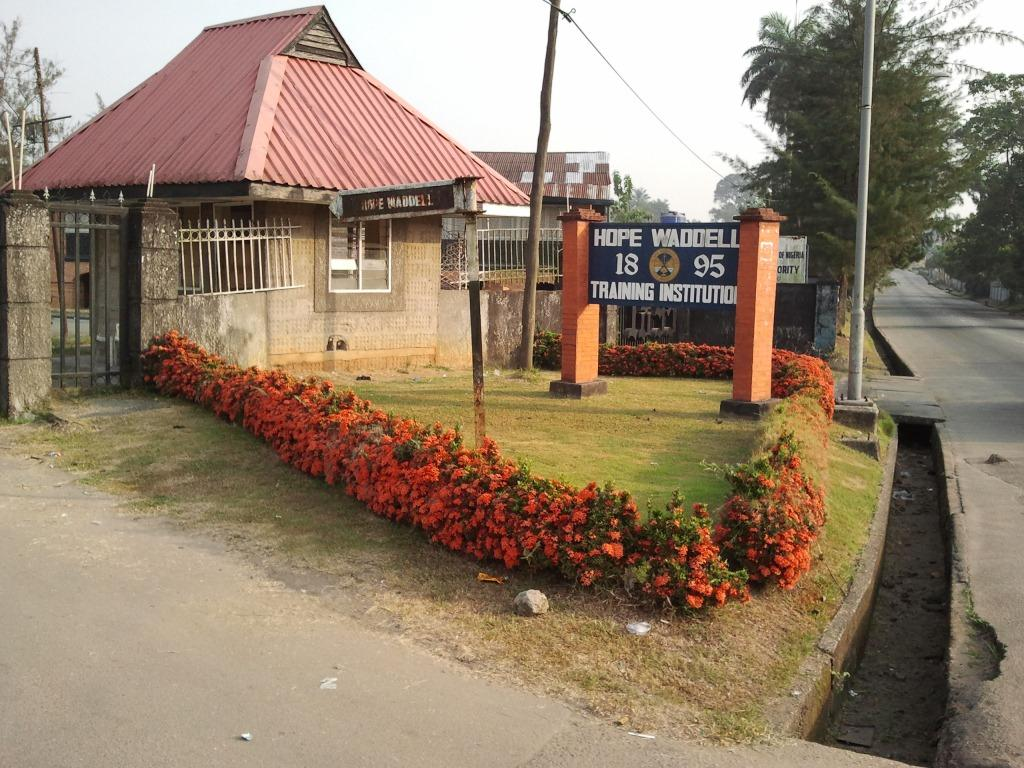
- Hope Waddell Training institute, December 2012
- Motto: In Spe Gloria Dei ("In hope of the glory of God")
- Type: Secondary
- Established: 1895; 131 years ago
- Location: Calabar, Cross River State, Nigeria; 4°58′28″N 8°19′35″E

- Location within Nigeria

The Hope Waddell Training Institution (HOWAD) is a school in Calabar, Cross River State, Nigeria. It was founded by missionaries from the United Presbyterian Church of Scotland in 1895. It is named after the Reverend Hope Masterton Waddell.

== Establishment and growth ==
Mary Slessor was a driving force behind the establishment of HOWAD.

The school started in 1895. Slessor landed in Calabar in 1876.

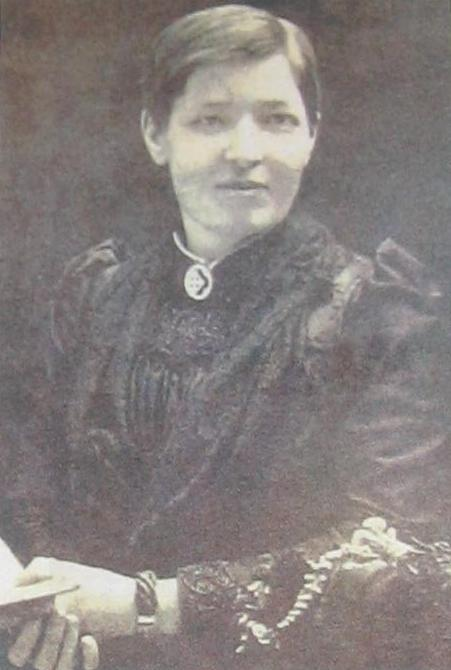
Mary Mitchell Slessor, a driving force behind establishment of the institute

The Scottish missionary Mary Mitchell Slessor, who had done much work with the Efik people around Calabar, was a driving force behind the establishment of the Institute. Edinburgh was hesitant about accepting Slessor's demand to establish an industrial training center, but eventually decided to set up an institute on similar lines to its two existing ones in Africa, Lovedale Institute in South Africa and Livingstonia in Nyasaland. Robert Laws, a United Presbyterian minister who had been involved with both of these institutions for a long time, was sent to make a feasibility study. Laws expressed complete confidence that the success of the other two schools could be replicated in Calabar.

The institution was established in 1894. The first school building was a prefabricated classroom block of corrugated iron sheets and Scandinavian pitch pine, built by a Glasgow firm and shipped to Calabar, where it was assembled in 1894. By March 1895 teaching had commenced. By 1900 the school had forty-two students. Two were doing gardening, five printing, eight tailoring, five engineering, eleven carpentry and eleven baking. According to Henry Carr the boys were "well disciplined, and their appearance... cheerful and healthy." They generally spoke English well and had good penmanship. However, the instruction programs were somewhat haphazard, dictated by whatever job the department was undertaking at any given time.

The school was more expensive than other missions, since it required machinery for industrial training, and by 1902 the mission was forced to accept government funding. As the school became established, competition for places became intense since graduates were guaranteed employment by the government, the mission or other local businesses, or had the opportunity to go on to higher studies. The balance of pupils, at first dominated by coastal communities, gradually shifted to include more from the hinterland. In 1919 the school had 31 Ibibio pupils compared to 82 Efik. By 1927 there were over 50 Ibibio pupils and by 1931 86 Ibibio, with 119 Efik. But students came to the school from all over West Africa, including Sierra Leone, Liberia, Ghana, Dahomey, the Cameroons and Fernando Po.

== Early curriculum ==
The school provided practical training to male students in carpentry, masonry, blacksmithing, coopering, naval engineering, brickmaking and bricklaying. Female students were taught dress-making and tailoring, domestic science and accountancy. The school soon became the largest vocational training institution in West Africa. The school maintained a vessel on the Calabar River, "The Diamond" for use by students studying maritime subjects. The region of Calabar called Diamond Hill takes its name from the vessel. In 1898 the school began teaching tailoring and bakery, with the products sold in the city markets. Agricultural students who worked on maintaining the botanical gardens and public parks in Calabar were given free board, clothing and tuition and some pocket money. They showed that new plants to the region including mango, banana, coffee and especially lemon and orange could flourish, although local farmers resisted these innovations.

In 1902, Rev. James Luke introduced soccer into the timetable despite opposition by parents, who thought it was a waste of time. Luke defended the sport as being healthy and teaching children cooperation and self-discipline. In the first two decades of the twentieth century, many Hope Waddell graduates moved to Lagos, from 1906 the capital of the new Protectorate of Southern Nigeria, to take white-collar jobs with the government. They brought with them their love of soccer, fostering the growth of teams in the city. Luke, who had picked up the game during seven years as a missionary in Jamaica, could thus perhaps be credited with introducing soccer to Nigeria.

A large flat-bed printing Wharfedale press was donated by "friends in Scotland" in 1903 and was still in use after 1960. Students worked in the print works and also as journalists on the Observer, Calabar's first newspaper, which was produced on the mission press. In 1903 the HWTI added classes in typing, shorthand, bookkeeping, business management and commerce. The school also included a standard all-ages school section giving primary and secondary education, with fees required for secondary school students. In 1921 Calabar was designated by the government as a secondary examination center for the Cambridge Local Examination. That year 8 students passed the examination out of 14 candidates from HWTI, which was considered an excellent result.

== Later years ==
After independence in 1960, followed by closure of the Presbyterian mission, the school became a standard state secondary school. Today it basically runs a grammar school curriculum. The buildings were allowed to deteriorate, the gardens were neglected, and of 2,000 students less than 200 are boarders. In 1994 the Old Boys Association launched a program to rehabilitate the school, with a fund-raising drive. Goals were to tar the access roads, install an electricity generator, renovate the science laboratories, equip the school library and erect a statue of Hope Waddell. By 2005, most of these goals had been met.

== Early principals ==
Principals up to the 1960s were:

Principal	Ethnicity	Years
W.R. Thompson	Scottish	1895–1902
James Luke	Scottish	1902–1907
J.K. Macgregor	Scottish	1907–1943
E. B. Jones	Scottish	1943–1945
N. C. Macrae	Scottish	1945–1952
J. A. T. Beattie	Scottish	1952–1957
Sir Dr. Francis Akanu Ibiam	Igbo	1957–1960
B. E. Okon	Efik	1960–1974

== Notable alumni ==
- Eni Njoku (born 6 November 1917), first vice-chancellor of the University of Lagos
- John Ogbu (9 May 1939 – 20 August 2003), Nigerian-American anthropologist and professor
- Kingsley O. Mbadiwe (1915–1990), nationalist, politician, statesman and former government minister
- Dennis Osadebay (29 June 1911 – 26 December 1994), politician, poet, journalist and premier of the Mid-Western Region of Nigeria
- Akanu Ibiam (1906–1995), medical missionary, Governor of Eastern Region, Nigeria (December 1960 – January 1966).
- Alex Mascot Ikwechegh, politician, businessman and philanthropist
- Anya Oko Anya (born 3 January 1937), professor of parasitology
- Eyo Ita (born 1904), leader of the Eastern Government of Nigeria in 1951
- Dr. Nnamdi Azikiwe (16 November 1904 – 11 May 1996), Nigeria's first president
- Eze Cyril Akagbulem Unamka OBE, MBE (1887 – March 1983), First Paramount Ruler of Mbaise County and Life President of Mbaise County Court
- Vice Admiral Edet Akinwale Wey, Chief of Naval Staff and later Chief of Staff Supreme Headquarters
- Senator Joseph Oqua Ansa, second republic senator representing Cross River southern senatorial district
