= Top Model (French TV series) season 1 =

Top Model
- Season 1
- No. of episodes: 8

Release
- Original network: Métropole 6
- Original release: July 5 – August 25, 2005

Season chronology
- Next → Season 2

The first season of Top Model aired from July to August 2005. The winner of the competition was 20-year-old Alizée Sorel from Switzerland.

== Contestants ==
(ages stated are at start of contest)

Contestant	Age	Height	Hometown	Finish	Place
Alexandra	25	1.76 m (5 ft 9 1/2 in)	Basel, Switzerland	Episode 2	12
Audrey Pillot	17	1.77 m (5 ft 9 1/2 in)	Carbuccia, Corsica	Episode 3	11
Blyvy Makasi	24	1.72 m (5 ft 7 1/2 in)	Villepinte	Episode 4	10
Nausicaa Rampony	24	1.71 m (5 ft 7 1/2 in)	Paris	Episode 5	9
Maude	21	1.75 m (5 ft 9 in)	Boulogne-Billancourt	Episode 6	8–6
Marie Nedjar	23	1.76 m (5 ft 9 1/2 in)	Vence	Episode 6	8–6
Lucie Doublet	18	1.76 m (5 ft 9 1/2 in)	Les Lilas	Episode 6	8–6
Marlène Rabinel	16	1.72 m (5 ft 7 1/2 in)	Brest	Episode 7	5–4
Binti Bangoura	23	1.80 m (5 ft 11 in)	3rd arrondissement of Paris	Episode 7	5–4
Karen Nicolini	22	1.77 m (5 ft 9 1/2 in)	Pineuilh	Episode 8	3–2
Emmanuelle Montaud	19	1.76 m (5 ft 9 1/2 in)	Royan	Episode 8	3–2
Alizée Gaillard	20	1.76 m (5 ft 9 1/2 in)	Euseigne, Switzerland	Episode 8	1

== Summaries ==
=== Call-out order ===
Order	Episodes							
Order	1	2	3	4	5	6	7	8
1	Binti	Karen	Emmanuelle	Karen	Alizée	Maude	Emmanuelle	Alizée
2	Alizée	Emmanuelle	Alizée	Marlène	Binti	Emmanuelle	Binti	Emmanuelle; Karen
3	Alexandra	Nausicaa	Marlène	Emmanuelle	Marlène	Karen	Karen	Emmanuelle; Karen
4	Marlène	Marie	Lucie	Nausicaa	Marie	Marie	Alizée	
5	Nausicaa	Binti	Karen	Maude	Emmanuelle	Alizée	Marlène	
6	Audrey	Lucie	Blyvy	Alizée	Karen	Binti		
7	Maude	Alizée	Binti	Binti	Lucie	Marlène		
8	Marie	Maude	Marie	Lucie	Maude	Lucie		
9	Lucie	Marlène	Nausicaa	Marie	Nausicaa			
10	Blyvy	Audrey	Maude	Blyvy				
11	Emmanuelle	Blyvy	Audrey					
12	Karen	Alexandra						

The contestant was eliminated
The contestant won the competition
