= Ginette Amara =

Minister of Scientific Research and Technological Innovation
- In office 12 September 2017 – 24 June 2021
- President: Faustin-Archange Touadéra
- Prime Minister: Simplice Sarandji; Firmin Ngrebada
- Preceded by: Moukadas Noure
- Succeeded by: Jean Laurent Magalé

Personal details
- Born: 3 January 1962 (age 64) Sarh, Chad
- Education: University of Bangui; École inter-États des sciences et médecine vétérinaires de Dakar
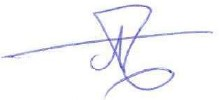
- Signature

Ginette Amara Ali Mazicki (born 3 January 1962) is a Central African academician, veterinarian, and politician.

== Early life and education ==
Belong to the Banda people, Amara was born in Sarh on 3 January 1962. Her father is Michel Ali, and her mother is Joséphine Attea. She hails from Ouandago, Nana-Grebizi.

She studied at Ecole primaire Centre filles de Bangui, Lycée Pie XII, and Lycée Boganda de Bangui. Afterwards, she continued her higher education at the University of Bangui and École inter-États des sciences et médecine vétérinaires de Dakar. In 1992, she earned a degree in Veterinary Doctor from École inter-États des sciences et médecine vétérinaires de Dakar with thesis titled L'Herbe du Laos : Chromolaena Odorata (L) R.M. KING et H. ROBINSON (Asteraceae) en République Centrafricaine (RCA) : essai de lutte avec des herbicides (The Grass of Laos: Chromolaena Odorata (L) R.M. KING and H. ROBINSON (Asteraceae) in the Central African Republic (CAR): Herbicide Control Trials.)

== Career ==
Amara became the Head of Service at a veterinary clinic in Bangui and the Agence Nationale de Développement de l’Elevage (ANDE) Veterinary Laboratory. She also served as the Director of Studies at Institut Supérieur de Développement Rural de Mbaîki (ISDR Mbaiki) and as the General Director and Central Inspector at the Ministries of Agriculture and Livestock.

In 2017, Sarandji appointed Amara as the Minister of Scientific Research and Technological Innovation. Under the Ngrebada cabinet, she served as the minister of scientific research again.

During her ministerial tenure, she undertook an inventory of laboratories at the University of Bangui and Bayanga and reformulated projects that aligned with the National Recovery and Peacebuilding Plan so that it could receive funds from several partners. Apart from that, she also became the speaker on ADEA's webinar titled "Impact of COVID-19 on Africa's Education: Reflecting on Promising Interventions and Challenges, towards a New Normal" in June 2020 and 4th High-Level Dialogue on Gender Equality and Education in Africa organized by the African Union in Addis Ababa on 5 February 2020.

In 2020, she planned to run at the 2020–21 Central African general election as the National Assembly candidate representing Kaga Bandoro 3rd district. However, the Constitutional Court annulled her candidacy on 28 November 2020.

== Personal life ==
Amara is married to Jean-Marie Mazicki-Goyoro and has six children.
