= Adriana Sklenaříková =

Slovak fashion model and actress

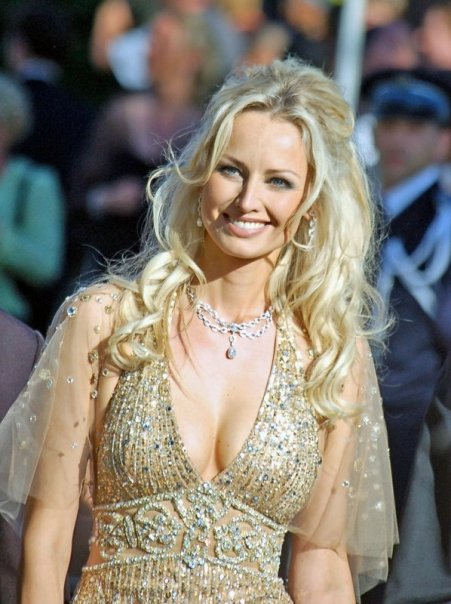
- Sklenaříková at the 2006 Cannes Film Festival
- Born: 17 September 1971 (age 55); Brezno, Czechoslovakia
- Other name: Adriana Karembeu
- Education: Charles University
- Spouses: Christian Karembeu (m. 1998; div. 2011); Aram Ohanian (m. 2014; div. 2022)
- Children: 1
- Modeling information
- Height: 1.85 m (6 ft 1 in)
- Hair color: Blonde
- Eye color: Blue

Adriana Sklenaříková (formerly Karembeu; born 17 September 1971) is a Slovak fashion model, television personality, and actress who lives and works in France. She is a former Guinness record holder for the longest legs among female models (at almost 1.24 m).

== Early life and education ==
Sklenaříková was born in Brezno to parents Miroslav Sklenařík and Zlatica Gazdiková. Her mother was a Slovak doctor, while her father was a Czech engineer originally from Vsetín, where her Czech surname originates. She also has a younger sister named Natalia, who works as a lawyer in Paris. At the time of Sklenaříková's birth, her parents were both students, and she was thus raised by her grandparents until she was six years old. Sklenaříková has gone on to comment that her father was cold and distant with her throughout her upbringing, and that he preferred her sister.

After completing her secondary education, Sklenaříková enrolled in Charles University in Prague to study medicine. In 1994, her third year of studies, Sklenaříková was discovered by a French modeling agency after competing in a beauty pageant.

== Career ==
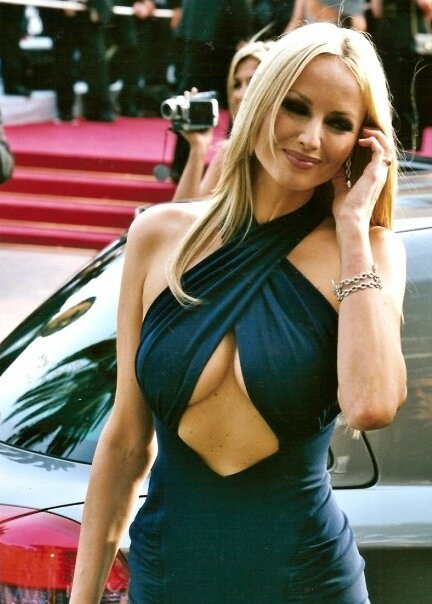
Sklenaříková at the 2005 Cannes Film Festival

=== 1994–2002: Career beginnings ===
After being signed to a French modeling agency, Sklenaříková left Prague and relocated to Paris. Her first days in France were difficult, as she spoke only Slovak, Czech, and Russian, and once went eight days without food as she did not have enough money to feed herself. Her first modeling job became a swimsuit photoshoot in the Bahamas for 3 Suisses, where she earned more money in one day than her mother earned in an entire year.

Sklenaříková's modeling career began to develop quickly, and she walked runways for Thierry Mugler, Rochas, Karl Lagerfeld, Givenchy, and Lanvin. Sklenaříková also appeared on the cover of several magazines, including Elle, Vanity Fair, Harper's Bazaar, Vogue, Cosmopolitan, Photo, Emma, and Maxim.

In 1994, she made her acting debut in the satirical film Prêt-à-Porter, appearing as herself in a cameo along with other models such as Claudia Schiffer, Naomi Campbell, and Helena Christensen. She later began her career in television hosting by serving as a presenter on the Rai 1 talk show Domenica in in Italy. She afterwards made a cameo appearance on the French comedy series Un gars, une fille, which precipitated her career in television.

In 1998, Sklenaříková was hired as one of the models for the Wonderbra campaign. She also appeared in campaigns for Victoria's Secret, Roberto Cavalli, Majestic, Onyx Jeans, and the Czech brand Škoda Auto.

=== 2003–2010: Diversification and stardom ===
In 2003, Sklenaříková appeared in a commercial for Bultex mattresses, which aired in France from 2003 to 2005. In 2004, she starred in the film 3 petites filles by Jean-Loup Hubert, which became her first starring acting role, and appeared in a supporting role in the Czech comedy film Jak básníci neztrácejí naději. In 2005, she launched her cosmetics company SILICIUM+, and was voted as the sexiest woman in the world by the readers of FHM France in 2006.

In 2007, she starred in the television film Adriana et moi. Later that year, she became the main host and judge of season two of Top Model, the French version of America's Next Top Model.

In 2008, Sklenaříková appeared in the French film Asterix at the Olympic Games, based on the Asterix comic series, appearing as Mrs. Geriatrix. She also appeared in the France 2 docuseries Rendez-vous en terre inconnue, where she spent two weeks with the Amhara people in Ethiopia. Sklenaříková also became the face of the French chain of opticians Atol, and they launched a collection of eyeglasses called the Adriana Karembeu Collection. She later appeared in advertisements for Virgin Mobile in France.

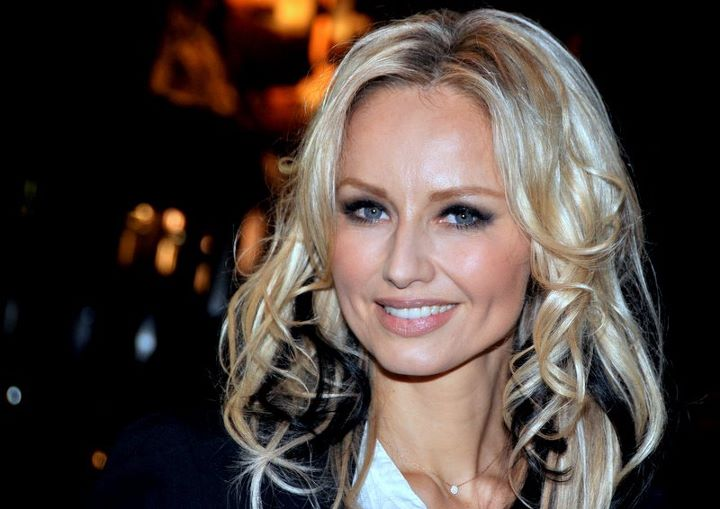
Sklenaříková at the 2012 NRJ Music Awards

=== 2011–present: Television hosting ===
In 2011, Sklenaříková became the sponsor of the modeling series Génération mannequin on NRJ 12. Later that year, she announced that her company AKD would be listed on the Euronext Paris. Also in 2011, Sklenaříková competed in season one of Danse avec les stars, the French version of Dancing with the Stars. She was partnered with professional dancer Julien Brugel, and they ultimately placed fourth in the competition.

In 2012, Sklenaříková co-hosted the France 2 docuseries Les Pouvoirs extraordinaires du corps humain alongside Michel Cymes. Later that year, she made an appearance on the M6 series Scènes de ménages. Also in 2012, she became the face of French furniture and home decor retailer Atlas.

In 2023, Sklenaříková participated in the M6 photography competition series La photo parfaite, the French version of the Dutch series Het Perfecte Plaatje.

== Personal life ==
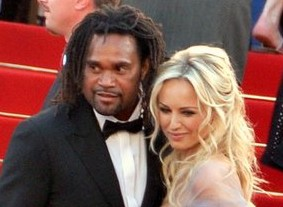
Sklenarikova with her ex-husband Christian Karembeu at the 2010 Cannes Film Festival

Sklenaříková met French football player Christian Karembeu on a flight from Paris to Milan in 1998, and they were married in December that year in Corsica. On 9 March 2011, in an interview to French magazine Paris Match, Sklenaříková revealed that she was separating from Karembeu. She stated that the causes for the separation were the couple's constant exposure in the media and their "hectic lifestyle", as well as him being "upset to see photographs of [her] with other men appearing in the press and speculation that [she] had a lover". Karembeu refused questions from the media about the divorce, stating that he would not comment in public about his private life. During the course of her marriage to Karembeu, Sklenaříková used the name Adriana Karembeu professionally, and is still often credited under this name.

In June 2014, Sklenaříková married Armenian businessman Aram Ohanian following a three-year relationship. Ohanian lives and works in Marrakesh, where he owns a restaurant. Their wedding was held in Monaco, and was attended by numerous film and show business stars. In August 2018, they had a daughter together. In December 2022, Sklenaříková announced her divorce from Ohanian.

In March 2026, Sklenaříková announced that she would be taking legal action against Ohanian, citing domestic violence and blackmail. Le Parisien later reported that Ohanian had made a report to the Paris prosecutor's office, accusing Sklenaříková of corruption of a minor, failure to fulfill parental obligations, and incitement to the use of narcotics. The Paris prosecutor's office later confirmed that it had begun an investigation into the failure to fulfill parental obligations accusation.

== Filmography ==
Year	Title	Role	Notes
1994	Prêt-à-Porter	Herself	Cameo
1999	Domenica In	Herself	
2004	Jak básníci neztrácejí naději	Madame Krásná	
2004	3 petites filles	Laetitia	
2007	Adriana et moi	Adriana	TV movie
2008	Asterix at the Olympic Games	Mrs. Geriatrix	
2013	R.I.S, police scientifique	Krystel Regnier	1 episode
2013	Scènes de ménage	Vanessa	2 episodes
2014	Nos chers voisins	Jennifer	1 episode
2015	Meurtres à Étretat	Karine Zenko	TV movie
2015	Enfin en vacances, à la mer	Vanessa	TV movie
2015	Section de recherches	Tina Kepler	1 episode
2015	Doc Martin	Adriana Soupov	1 episode
2015	Ex-Model	Adriana	1 episode
2021	Plus belle la vie	Adriana	Season 18; recurring role
2023	Un gars, une fille (au pluriel)	Une fille	
2025	L'Incroyable Embouteillage 2 : Vive les mariés !	Juliette	TV movie

== Award ==
- 2009 Vienna Fashion Award, category Style Icon
