= Top Model (French TV series) season 2 =

Top Model
- Season 2
- No. of episodes: 41

Release
- Original network: Métropole 6
- Original release: October 29 – December 21, 2007

Season chronology
- ← Previous; Season 1

The second season of Top Model aired on weekdays from October to December 2007, with a total of 41 episodes broadcast. This season follows 14 girls as they compete with each other to become the new face of Dessange Paris for one year.

Slovak-born model Adriana Karembeu hosted the competition, and the judging panel consisted of Dutch model and journalist Rosalie Afflelou, model scout and agency director Brice Compagnon and fashion designer Benjamin Galopin.

The international destinations for this season were London, Milan and Moscow. The winner of the competition was 17-year-old Karen Pillet from Maintenon.

== Format changes ==
This season, the episodes will broadcast daily from Monday to Friday for eight weeks, with 41 episodes broadcast. Each day, the members of the jury give the girls their personalized schedule. On the program: photoshoot, sports lessons with Gregory Bouchelaghem, theater lessons with Rodolphe Sand, dentist with Philippe Chpindel, makeover with Dany Sanz, Julia Fisher or Vincent McDoom, personal development course with Marine Méchin.

- On Mondays, the girls will have a challenge to find to is the best and the worst of the challenge.
- On Tuesdays, the girl who fails the challenge yesterday is challenged again, in a more embarrassing or humiliating way. The girl who has best succeeded in her challenge yesterday is rewarded.
- On Wednesday, the jury chooses three of the girls, and elects the "Top of the week", which gives her immune from elimination that week.
- On Thursday, the girls will have the photoshoot.
- On Friday, The best photo of each that the girls from yesterday photoshoot will be judged on the judging room and one of them will be eliminated.

== Contestants ==
(ages stated are at start of contest)

Contestant	Age	Height	Hometown	Finish	Place
Anne-Sophie Acker	17	1.73 m (5 ft 8 in)	Saint-Clément-de-Rivière	Episode 4	14–13 (quit)
Anna Jacobe	22	1.76 m (5 ft 9 1/2 in)	Villeurbanne	Episode 4	14–13 (quit)
Alice Cournille	18	1.79 m (5 ft 10 1/2 in)	Aix-en-Provence	Episode 5	12
Cynthia Lancien	19	1.80 m (5 ft 11 in)	Marseille	Episode 10	11
Léa Peyruse-Boroffka	17	1.77 m (5 ft 9 1/2 in)	Montalivet	Episode 21	10
Stéphanie Lémains	18	1.77 m (5 ft 9 1/2 in)	Vaulx-en-Velin	Episode 21	9
Anaïs Monory	17	1.73 m (5 ft 8 in)	Toulouse	Episode 26	8
Alina Herzegova	18	1.75 m (5 ft 9 in)	Vignieu	Episode 32	7
Julie Ricci	21	1.75 m (5 ft 9 in)	Lyon	Episode 36	6
Laura Milazzo	19	1.73 m (5 ft 8 in)	Montpellier	Episode 38	5–4
Célia Nicolas	22	1.78 m (5 ft 10 in)	Lausanne, Switzerland	Episode 38	5–4
Agnès Bouréalis	20	1.78 m (5 ft 10 in)	Chatou	Episode 41	3
Charlie Gaffarel	22	1.73 m (5 ft 8 in)	Paris	Episode 41	2
Karen Pillet	17	1.75 m (5 ft 9 in)	Maintenon	Episode 41	1

== Summaries ==
=== Call-out order ===
Order	Episodes									
Order	5	10	15	21	26	31	36	38	41	
1	Stéphanie	Célia	Karen	Agnès	Célia	Julie	Charlie	Karen	Karen	Karen
2	Célia	Alina	Célia	Karen	Julie	Célia	Karen	Charlie	Charlie	Charlie
3	Karen	Charlie	Julie	Alina	Agnès	Karen	Laura	Agnès	Agnès	
4	Alina	Agnès	Laura	Julie	Charlie	Charlie	Célia	Célia; Laura		
5	Charlie	Karen	Alina	Célia	Karen	Agnès	Agnès	Célia; Laura		
6	Julie	Anaïs	Anaïs	Charlie	Alina	Laura	Julie			
7	Agnès	Julie	Charlie	Laura	Laura	Alina				
8	Laura	Stéphanie	Agnès	Anaïs	Anaïs					
9	Cynthia	Léa	Stéphanie	Stéphanie						
10	Alice	Laura	Léa	Léa						
11	Anna; Anne-Sophie	Cynthia								
12	Anna; Anne-Sophie									

The contestant was "Top of the week" and was immune from elimination
The contestant was eliminated
The contestant was quit
The contestant was the original eliminee, but was saved
The contestant won the competition

- In episode 4, Anna and Anne-Sophie quit the competition. They were replaced by Anaïs and Léa in episode 6.
- In episode 15, Léa was eliminated, but the judges decided to keep her in the competition.
- Episodes 21 and 38 featured double eliminations.
- Episode 31 ended on a cliffhanger, with the elimination being shown the following episode.

== Judges ==
- Adriana Karembeu
- Rosalie Afflelou
- Brice Compagnon
- Benjamin Galopin
