= Aboubakar Moukadas Nouré =

Minister of National Education
- In office 24 June 2021 – 5 January 2024
- President: Faustin-Archange Touadéra
- Prime Minister: Henri-Marie Dondra; Félix Moloua
- Preceded by: Himself (as Primary, Secondary, Technical Education and Literacy)
- Succeeded by: Aurelien Simplice Zingas

Minister of Primary, Secondary, Technical Education and Literacy
- In office 12 September 2017 – 10 June 2021
- President: Faustin-Archange Touadéra
- Prime Minister: Simplice Sarandji; Firmin Ngrébada
- Preceded by: Himself (as Minister of National Education, Higher Education and Scientific Research)
- Succeeded by: Himself (as Minister of National Education)

Minister of National Education, Higher Education and Scientific Research
- In office 11 April 2016 – 12 September 2017
- President: Faustin-Archange Touadéra
- Prime Minister: Simplice Sarandji
- Preceded by: Bernard Simiti
- Succeeded by: Himself (as Minister of Primary, Secondary, Technical Education and Literacy; Jean-Jacques Sanze (as Minister of Higher Education; Ginette Amara (as Minister of Scientific Research and Technological Innovation)

Personal details
- Born: 4 July 1958 (age 68) Brazzaville, French Congo
- Party: MCU
- Education: Université Félix Houphouët-Boigny

Aboubakar Moukadas Nouré (born 4 July 1958), also written Aboubakar Moukadas Nour, is a Central African academician, sociologist, writer, and politician.

== Early life and education ==
Born in Brazzaville on 17 March 1958, Nouré belongs to Hausa and is a Muslim. He completed his primary education in Brazzaville. Afterwards, he returned to Bangui and received an A4 baccalaureate diploma. He continued his higher education at the Institute of Ethno-Sociology of Université Félix Houphouët-Boigny, studying social studies and obtained her doctoral degree in sociology.

== Career ==
=== Academics and politics ===
Nouré returned to the Central African Republic in 1995 and worked at the University of Bangui as a lecturer. Apart from being a lecturer, he served as Head of the Department of Philosophy and later Sociology.

Apart from Nouré's academic career, he also served in various positions in politics. From 2004 to 2005, he became Electoral Commissioner. He also served as the National Councillor. Furthermore, he joined the National Transitional Council as a representative from Nana-Grébizi and became its advisor. In 2018, he joined MCU party and was appointed as the Deputy General Rapporteur of MCU's political bureau. He also become the Head of Platform of Central African Muslim Association. Serving as Head of the Muslim Association, he refused to accept the appointed members of Bangui’s 3rd arrondissement National Elections Authority branch, as there were no Muslims within the body amidst the heterogeneous population in the area.

=== Minister of Education ===
Sarandji appointed Nouré as Minister of National Education, Higher Education and Research on 11 April 2016. When Touadera did reshuffle in 2017, Nouré remained in the same position in the previous Sarandji cabinet, although the scientific research was no longer part of it. Under Ngrébada, he continued to serve as Minister of National Education. He was also reappointed as the Minister of National Education, albeit the name changed, on 24 June 2021. When Moloua cabinet was announced, he continued to serve as Minister of National Education. He stepped down as Minister of National Education on 5 January 2024 and Aurelien Simplice Zingas replaced the position.

==== 2016 - 2020 ====
In 2017, Nouré reformed the baccalaureate by eliminating corruption in the grading process. Although this reformation sparked protests among several students and parents, it provided a real education situation across the country. He spearheaded the radio education program to provide education to the students who were unable to access education and started it on 20 December 2019 through partnership from UNICEF and Radio Ndeke Luka. During business trip to Mobaye on 27 July 2019, he discovered that there were no qualified teachers in the town because they preferred to stay in Bangui. Responding to the absence of competent teachers, he threatened to withhold their salaries unless they returned to Mobaye.

==== 2020 - 2024 ====
In 2020, Nouré claimed that the minister had built more than 200 schools, provided free textbooks to students, and appointed young participants from the training center as teachers to address the shortage. Starting on the Academic Year 2021-2022, he included Sango into the education system. On 21 January 2022, together with Jean Laurent Syssa Magalé, he signed education cooperation with MoU Russian House and one of the agreements were the inclusion of Russian into school and university subject. He commenced the pre-school curriculum at Bangui Centre nursery school on 13 April 2023. Apart from that, he introduced the Multi-Year Basic Education Program in October 2023. Under this education program, sustainable infrastructures were built and students' and teachers' conditions were strengthened to improve lower secondary education conditions.

In 2023, some Primary 1 and 2 and Technical Education teachers and the union leaders launched strikes. Nouré responded to the strikes by warning of retaliation and sanctions against the union leaders and teachers, respectively.

== Awards ==
- Knight Order of Academic Palms of the African and Malagasy Council for Higher Education (CAMES; 2019)

== Works ==
- Associations « endogènes » et réseaux associatifs en Centrafrique
- Histoire des élites musulmanes oubanguiennes
- Les Intellectuels « organiques », « locaux » et les perspectives d'une participation
- Organisation à vocation coopérative et mouvement coopératif en République Centrafricaine
