= Ramata (film) =

- Directed by: Léandre-Alain Baker
- Written by: Léandre-Alain Baker, Miguel Machalski
- Produced by: La Huit Production, Mediatik Communication
- Starring: Katoucha Niane
- Cinematography: François Kuhnel
- Edited by: Didier Ranz
- Music by: Wasis Diop
- Release date: 2007
- Running time: 90 minutes
- Country: Senegal
- Language: French

Ramata is a 2007 feature-length fiction film directed by Léandre-Alain Baker and starring the model Katoucha Niane in the title role.

== Synopsis ==
Ramata is a spellbindingly beautiful woman in her fifties. She has been married for thirty years now to Matar Samb, a former prosecutor who is now the Minister of Justice. They live in Les Almadies, an elegant neighbourhood of Dakar. Ngor Ndong is 25. He is a young, strong, mysterious man with no fixed residence and an occasional petty crook known by the police. One evening, in a taxi that Ngor Ndong just happens to be driving, Ramata agrees to follow this young man to the Copacabana. She then begins a new life.

== Production ==
The film was adapted from a novel by Abasse Ndione. Baker said he hesitated at first over choosing Katoucha as the lead due to her reputation and the fact that she was not an actress, but eventually accepted that she was right for the role. He said of the film "Essentially, it is the story of the metamorphosis of a woman, her relationship with the world, and the universe around her". Ramata was released in France in 2011.
