= Eni Njoku =

Nigerian botanist & academic (1917–1974)

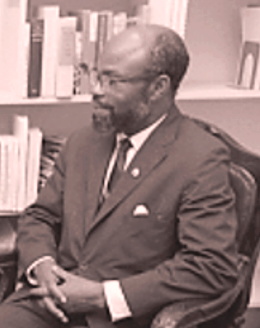

3rd Vice Chancellor of the University of Nigeria, Nsukka
- In office 1966–1970
- Preceded by: Glen L. Taggart
- Succeeded by: Herbert C. Kodilinye

1st Vice chancellor of the University of Lagos
- In office 1962–1965
- Preceded by: Himself
- Succeeded by: Saburi Biobaku

Personal details
- Born: 6 November 1917 Ebem, Ohafia, Southern Region, British Nigeria (now in Abia state, Nigeria)
- Died: 22 December 1974 (aged 57) London, England
- Scientific career
- Education: Hope Waddell Institute; Yaba Higher College; University of Manchester; University of London
- Known for: Science research, teaching University administration
- Spouse: Winifred Beardsall
- Children: 4 (including Eni G. Njoku)
- Fields: Botany
- Workplaces: University of Ibadan; University of Lagos; Michigan State University; University of Nigeria, Nsukka

Eni Njoku (6 November 1917 – 22 December 1974) was a Nigerian botanist and educator. He was vice-chancellor of the University of Lagos (1962–1965) and the University of Nigeria, Nsukka (1966–1970). He served in the Nigerian House of Representatives as federal minister of Mines and Power, and was chairman of the Electricity Corporation of Nigeria. He was an emissary at OAU-sponsored peace talks.

== Biography ==
=== Education ===
Eni Njoku was born on 6 November 1917 in Ebem, Ohafia, Abia State. He is of Igbo origin.

He was educated at Ebem Primary School and attended the Hope Waddell Training Institute, Calabar from 1933 to 1936. He attended the Yaba Higher College (now Yaba College of Technology) Lagos from 1937 to 1939 graduating with a tertiary education certificate.

Njoku studied botany at the University of Manchester in England. He graduated with a first-class honors degree in 1947 and obtained his M.A. degree the following year. In 1954, he obtained his external doctorate degree from the University of London.

=== Career ===
When he returned to Nigeria in 1948, Njoku took up a teaching appointment at the University College, Ibadan (now University of Ibadan) as a lecturer in botany. He was one of only two Nigerians on the academic staff at the opening of the college in 1948. He studied photoperiodicity in tropical crops and plants, and published several research papers on these topics. He became a senior lecturer and then professor. He served as head of the Department of Botany and dean of the Faculty of Science. He was a member of the University Council from 1955 to 1962. Entering politics, he was a member of the Nigerian House of Representatives in the federal government, serving as minister of Mines and Power from 1952 to 1953. He was chairman of the Electricity Corporation of Nigeria (1960).

In 1962, Njoku became the first vice-chancellor of the University of Lagos. Following a major crisis in 1965 over his re-appointment, he resigned to become a visiting professor at Michigan State University. In 1966, Njoku was appointed vice-chancellor of the University of Nigeria, Nsukka where he remained until the outbreak of the Nigerian Civil War in 1967.

During the civil war Njoku remained in Biafra as an advisor and administrator, advocating for peaceful resolution of the civil war conflict. He was a leader of Biafran delegations to the Ad Hoc Constitutional Conference in Lagos (1966) and OAU-sponsored peace talks in Niamey and Addis Ababa (1968). After the war ended in 1970 he returned to teaching and research at the University of Nigeria, which he continued until his death in 1974.

=== Legacy ===
Eni Njoku was a pre-eminent Nigerian scholar, teacher, administrator, and scientist. He was a pioneer in advancing the development of higher education and universities in Nigeria. Early in his career he was an outspoken advocate for improvement in the quality of Nigerian higher education. Later, Ashby referred to him as “one of the most eminent of Nigerians” and noted his “enlightened leadership of the University of Lagos.” In addition to his publications, Njoku received international recognition as a scientist-educator through his leadership in the activities of UNESCO furthering higher education and training in West Africa.

=== Recognition and awards ===
Njoku served on the boards of the Commonwealth Scientific Committee, the United Nations Advisory Committee on the Application of Science and Technology as well as the UNESCO Advisory Committee in Natural Sciences. He also served on the councils of the Universities of Zambia and Zaire (Democratic Republic of Congo). He received the honorary D.Sc. degree from the University of Nigeria in 1964, and in 1966 Michigan State University conferred on him an honorary doctor of laws degree. In 1973 the University of Lagos awarded its first vice-chancellor an honorary D.Sc. degree.

=== Personal life ===
Njoku was married to Winifred O. Njoku (née Beardsall). He had four children - three daughters and a son. His son, Eni G. Njoku, is a scientist who worked in the United States of America at the Jet Propulsion Laboratory.

== Selected works ==
- Njoku, Eni (1956). Studies in the morphogenesis of leaves. XI. The effect of light intensity on leaf shape in Ipomoea caerulea.
- Njoku, Eni (1963). Seasonal periodicity in the growth and development of some forest trees in Nigeria: I. Observations on mature trees.
- Njoku, Eni (1971). The effect of sugars and applied chemicals on heteroblastic development in Ipomoea Purpurea grown in aseptic culture.

== See also ==
- List of vice-chancellors of Nigerian universities
