= Léandre-Alain Baker =

Actor and film director from the Central African Republic

- Born: Bangui, Central African Republic
- Occupation: Filmmaker
- Known for: Ramata

Léandre-Alain Baker is an actor and film director from the Central African Republic.

== Career ==
Baker was born in Bangui in the Central African Republic. He is a national of the Republic of the Congo and now lives in Paris. He is an author, actor and stage director. Working with the writer Emmanuel Dongala he animated the Théâtre de l’Éclair in Brazzaville. He has directed short and feature-length films, and two documentary films on writers Sony Lab'ou Tansi and Tchicaya U Tam'si. As an actor, he has played in several films and TV movies.

== Work ==
Baker is the author of several novels and plays. In 1993, he began to make short films. He released his first feature film, the documentary Diogène à Brazzaville, a portrait of the Congolese writer Sony Labou Tansi. Three years later he followed this with a portrait of the writer Tchicaya U Tam'si. His short film Les Oranges de Belleville about a blind man was one of fifteen films from fifteen different directors combined into the movie Paris, la métisse de 2005. In 2006 his play Les jours se traînent, les nuits aussi (The days drag on, the nights too) was broadcast on Czech radio. Talking of the play, he said "it is not protest or activist, but more psychological. These are stories of women and men, their sufferings, their difficulties ahead in life".

His first feature-length fiction film was Ramata (2007), a drama with the model Katoucha Niane in the title role. It tells of a Senegalese woman who, aged 50, discovers the pleasures of the flesh in the arms of a little thug 25 years younger. Ramata was released in France in 2011. The film was adapted from a novel by Abasse Ndione. Baker said he hesitated at first over choosing Katoucha as the lead due to her reputation and the fact that she was not an actress, but eventually accepted that she was right for the role. He said of the film "Essentially, it is the story of the metamorphosis of a woman, her relationship with the world, and the universe around her".
