= Eni G. Njoku =

American scientist

- Eni Gerald Njoku
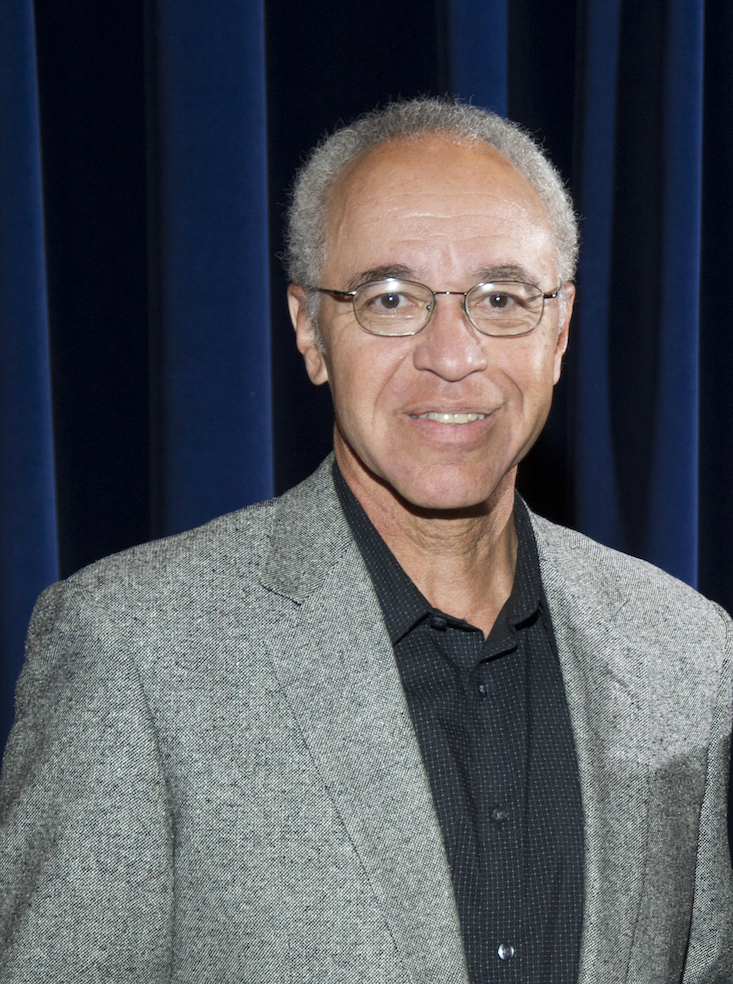
- Njoku in 2013
- Born: May 13, 1950 (age 75); Ibadan, Nigeria
- Education: Cambridge University; Massachusetts Institute of Technology
- Known for: Satellite sea surface temperature measurement Soil moisture remote sensing Soil Moisture Active Passive
- Children: 1
- Scientific career
- Fields: Microwave remote sensing
- Institutions: Jet Propulsion Laboratory, California Institute of Technology

Eni G. Njoku (born May 13, 1950) is a Nigerian-American scientist specializing in microwave remote sensing. He worked at the Jet Propulsion Laboratory (JPL), California Institute of Technology, where he was responsible for developing techniques for sea surface temperature and soil moisture remote sensing using microwave radiometers. He produced the first microwave-derived sea surface temperature maps from space, and developed the first application of deployable mesh antennas for satellite Earth observation. From 2008-2013, he served as project scientist of NASA's first soil moisture mission, the Soil Moisture Active Passive (SMAP) mission, launched in 2015.

== Early life ==
Njoku was born in Ibadan, Nigeria, one of four siblings. His father Eni Njoku was a Nigerian university administrator and professor of botany. His mother Winifred was from Manchester, England. He attended high school at King's College, Lagos and the Leys School, Cambridge. At Clare College, University of Cambridge he studied natural sciences and electrical sciences, graduating with a BA in 1972. He pursued further studies at the Massachusetts Institute of Technology, graduating with SM and PhD degrees in electrical engineering in 1974 and 1976, respectively.

== Career ==
Njoku began his career in 1976 as a National Academy of Sciences postdoctoral research associate, joining JPL in 1977. He conducted experimental studies of soil microwave emission, demonstrating the feasibility of estimating soil moisture using remote measurements. He was a member of the algorithm development team for the microwave radiometer on the Seasat satellite, NASA's first oceanographic satellite launched in 1978. He produced the first microwave-derived sea surface temperature maps of the global oceans.

Njoku was tasked by NASA in 1983 to organize and chair a series of science community workshops to intercompare the accuracies of sea surface temperature measurements by microwave and visible spectrum-infrared instruments on polar orbiting and geostationary satellites. The workshops contributed to improvements in the operational sea surface temperature products generated by the National Oceanic and Atmospheric Administration (NOAA). Njoku was awarded the NASA Exceptional Service Medal in 1985.

Njoku worked at NASA Headquarters, Washington, DC from 1986-1990 as a program scientist for Earth science data information systems. He contributed to coordination of satellite data management across NASA data centers and between U.S. and international space agencies. He participated in establishing the Earth Observing System Data and Information System EOSDIS. Njoku served in JPL management roles after 1991, while also leading design studies for future spaceborne microwave sensing systems. He led a multiyear program of field experiments using JPL ground-based and airborne radiometers to pave the way for development of a space-based remote global soil moisture observing system.

In 1996, Njoku became a science team member for the Advanced Microwave Scanning Radiometer (AMSR), launched on the Aqua (NASA) and ADEOS II (JAXA) satellites in 2002, responsible for soil moisture products. From 1998-2001, he was the lead scientist for advanced technology studies investigating the use of inflatable and mesh antennas for Earth remote sensing. His team successfully demonstrated the feasibility of a 6-meter mesh reflector antenna system for low microwave frequency (L-band) soil moisture sensing. This study led to proposal of the NASA Hydrosphere State (Hydros) satellite mission in 2002, but the mission was not finally approved. A follow-up proposal, recommended by the National Academy of Sciences Earth Science Decadal Survey, was approved by NASA in 2008 as Soil Moisture Active Passive (SMAP), NASA's first dedicated soil moisture mission. Njoku served as the project scientist for SMAP from 2008-2013. SMAP was launched successfully into space and began its operations phase in early 2015. Njoku was awarded the NASA Exceptional Public Service Medal in 2016.

Njoku was elected a Fellow of the Institute of Electrical and Electronics Engineers in 1995 and served on the administrative committee of the IEEE Geoscience and Remote Sensing Society becoming vice-president for professional activities in 1996-97. He is the editor-in-chief of the Encyclopedia of Remote Sensing. In 2001-2002, he was a Dr. Martin Luther King Visiting Scholar at MIT.

== Awards ==
- Fellow of the Institute of Electrical and Electronics Engineers, 1995
- NASA Exceptional Service Medal, 1985
- NASA Exceptional Public Service Medal, 2016
