= Opportune Aymadji =

Chadian film-maker and politician

- Born: Chad
- Occupations: Filmmaker and politician

Opportune Aymadji is a Chadian filmmaker and politician. She is a Patriotic Salvation Movement (MPS) Member of the National Assembly. In July 2015 she unsuccessfully attempted to become MPS Regional Secretary General for Logone Oriental.

== Films ==
- Tatie Pouvait Vivre, 1995.
