= Katoucha Niane =

Guinean model, activist and author

- Born: October 23, 1960; Conakry, Guinea
- Died: February 2, 2008 (aged 47); Paris, France

The cover of Katoucha Niane's 2007 book, "Dans ma chair".

Katoucha Niane (23 October 1960 – 2 February 2008) was a Guinean model, activist and author. Nicknamed "The Peul Princess" (in reference to her ethnic Fula background), she worked, and later wrote, under the single name "Katoucha". She was known as the muse of Yves Saint Laurent during the 1980s.

== Early life and career ==
When she was a child, Katoucha and her family were forced into exile after her father, the author, playwright and historian Djibril Tamsir Niane, came into conflict with Guinean President, Sekou Toure. Living with an uncle in Mali, she rejoined her family in Dakar at the age of 12. There she lived with the family of her paternal uncle, whose wife was private secretary to the President of Senegal, Léopold Sédar Senghor. After marrying her husband at the age of 17 and giving birth to her first child, they emigrated to France.

It was there in the 1980s that she began modeling; first for Thierry Mugler, then for Paco Rabanne and Christian Lacroix, and became known as Yves Saint Laurent's "muse". She remained one of the best-known models in France, and an icon in Guinea. In 2005, she worked as host of the French-language television program France's Next Top Model. She was the star of the film Ramata (2007), directed by Léandre-Alain Baker, in which she played the title role. It tells of a Senegalese woman who, aged 50, discovers the pleasures of the flesh in the arms of a man 25 years younger. Ramata was released in France in 2011.

== Activist ==
Niane stopped modeling in 1994 to focus on activism. She had been an outspoken activist against female circumcision, a rite performed in some African nations. Following her success as a model, she started the organization KPLCE - Katoucha pour la lutte contre l’excision (English: Katoucha for the battle against female circumcision). Niane herself was circumcised at the age of nine. In 2007, she published a book about her personal circumcision experience, Dans ma chair (Eng: In My Flesh), in France.

== Death ==
Katoucha lived in a houseboat on the Seine, near the Alexander III bridge in Paris. On 1 February 2008, she returned to her houseboat from a party. This was the last time she was reportedly seen alive. On 4 February 2008, police opened a missing persons case for her. Her purse was found untouched outside the door to her boat. Police believed that no foul play was involved, and that she was likely intoxicated and fell into the Seine.

Her body was found in the Seine River on 28 February 2008. The 47-year-old model is believed to have died from an accidental drowning : during The night of 31 January to 1 February 2008, an incident at the navigation weir at Varennes-sur-Seine generated a "rupture wave" that propagated along the reaches of the Seine. The event was monitored during the night by the Flood Forecasting Service, while the flood vigilance level remained at green.
