= Georgette Florence Koyt-Deballé =

Central African Republic academic administrator

Georgette Florence Koyt-Deballé (born 1960) is an academic administrator from the Central African Republic.

== Life ==
After studying in France, Koyt-Deballé became a professor of English at the University of Bangui in 1988. She later served as the University rector from 2011 to 2013.

== Works ==
- C'est la vie: poèmes, Bangui, 2007.
- Nago, ou, Comment s'en sortir, Bangui, 2008 / Nago et sa grand-mère, L'harmattan, 2017
- Illustrated bilingual lexicon sango-english t.2, Honoré Editions
- Manu et les fourmis ; histoires de Centrafrique, L'harmattan, 2018
- Illustrated bilingual lexicon, Saint Honoré Editions, 2017
- Histoires étranges, Edilivre,2014
- Ravages, Acoria, 2008
- Lexique illustré sängö-français - français-sängö,éditions Universitaires Européennes, 2018
- Les plantes de Centrafrique et leurs usages endogènes,éditions Universitaires Européennes
