= Todd McGrain =

American sculptor

- Known for: The Lost Bird Project
- Awards: Guggenheim Fellowship for Creative Arts, US & Canada

Todd McGrain is a visual artist and documentary filmmaker best known for The Lost Bird Project, a public art initiative memorializing birds driven to extinction in modern times.

== Career ==
=== Art ===
McGrain has created and installed large-scale bronze memorials at locations significant to the natural history and decline of six iconic North American bird species including the Carolina Parakeet, Eskimo Curlew, Great Auk, Heath Hen, Labrador Duck, and Passenger Pigeon. Additionally, McGrain created a traveling exhibition of the editioned bronze castings of the Lost Bird Memorials. Since its inaugural exhibition at the Cornell lab of Ornithology in 2008 the Lost Birds have been presented at a wide range of venues including the gardens of the Smithsonian Institution. The Lost Bird Project was the subject of a documentary film produced by Middlemarch films in 2011. In addition to his environmentally focused work, McGrain has created several large-scale sculpture installations reflecting Buddhist values, most notable for the Rochester Zen Center in Rochester, New York and the Chapin Mill Zen Retreat Center in Batavia, New York.

In 2021 McGrain was identified as the sculptor behind the unsanctioned and anonymously installed sculpture installation of York in Portland Oregon. Born into slavery in the 1770’s to the family of William Clark, York became a crucial member of the 1804 Lewis and Clark Expedition.

Through his long career McGrain has received several grants and awards including the Guggenheim Memorial Fellowship.

=== Film and scientific work ===
In 2015 McGrain founded the documentary film company Lost Bird Films and had his directorial debut in 2019 with the release of Elephant Path / Njaia Njoku. Elephant Path captures the beauty of the rare and elusive Forest Elephants as it follows the lives of the people committed to studying and protecting this endangered species. McGrain is also a Founding member of Smartfin, a community science initiative that enlists paddle sport enthusiasts to collect data for oceanographic research. The Smartfin Project offers research-grade, data-collecting surfboard fins to its ocean-engaged members and encourages them to surf or SUP with the fins regularly in order to transfer useful nearshore data to the cloud for oceanographic scientists to use in their research.

== Works ==
- Passenger Pigeon, the Carolina parakeet, the Heath Hen, the Great Auk, the Eskimo Curlew and the Labrador Duck. McGrain
- Elephant Path: Njaia Njoku
- Bust of York in Portland, Oregon

== See also ==
- List of Guggenheim Fellowships awarded in 1996
