= Top Model (French TV series) =

- 2005 logo
- Created by: Tyra Banks
- Starring: Adriana Karembeu; Odile Sarron; Katoucha Niane; Fred Farrugia; Patrick Lemire
- Opening theme: 1 - "In Your Eyes" by Kylie Minogue
- Country of origin: France
- No. of episodes: 49

Production
- Running time: 60 minutes

Original release
- Network: M6
- Release: July 14, 2005 – December 21, 2007

Top Model is a French reality television series based on America's Next Top Model.

== Show format ==
=== Challenges ===
The challenges usually focused on an element important to modeling. A guest judge, who was unique to each episode, evaluated the contestants and decided the winner of the challenge, who received a prize for her victory. The winner was then permitted to allow a certain number of other contestants to receive a similar, but lesser, reward, while the others were given nothing.

=== Judging and elimination ===
Based on the contestants' performance in the week's challenge, photoshoot, and general attitude, the judges deliberated and decided which girl must leave the competition. Once the judges made their decision, the contestants were called back into the room. The host called out the names of the contestants who were not eliminated, giving them a copy of their best photo from the shoot. The last two contestants left standing were given criticism, and one was eliminated.

== Cycles ==
| Cycle | Premiere date | Winner | Runner-up | Other contestants in order of elimination | Number of contestants | International Destinations |
|---|---|---|---|---|---|---|
| 1 | 5 July 2005 | Alizée Gaillard | Emmanuelle Montaud & Karen Nicolini | Alexandra, Audrey Pillot, Blyvy Makasi, Nausicaa Rampony, Maude & Marie Nedjar & Lucie Doublet, Marlène Rabinel & Binti Bangoura | 12 | Nice |
| 2 | 29 October 2007 | Karen Pillet | Charlie Gaffarel | Anne-Sophie Acker (quit) & Anna Jacobe (quit), Alice Cournille, Cynthia Lancien, Léa Peyruse-Boroffka, Stéphanie Lémains, Anaïs Monory, Alina Herzegova, Julie Ricci, Laura Milazzo, Célia Nicholas, Agnès Bouréalis | 14 | London; Milan; Moscow |
