= Léonie Yangba Zowe =

- Other name: Zoe
- Citizenship: Central African Republic
- Occupation: filmmaker
- Known for: Yangba bolo,Lengue,N'Zale, 1986,Paroles de sages

Léonie Yangba Zowe or Zoe is a filmmaker from the Central African Republic.

Yangba Zowe has studied in France, writing a thesis on the Nigerien filmmaker Oumarou Ganda.

Her super 8 films, made with support from the French Ministry of Cooperation, document Central African Republic dances and rituals. Two of her documentaries were shown at the Créteil International Women's Film Festival in 1989.

== Films ==
- Yangba bolo, 1985
- Lengue, 1985
- N'Zale, 1986
- Paroles de sages, 1987
