= Joseph Akouissone =

Central African film director, actor, and journalist (1943–2019)

Joseph Akouissonne
- Born: January 1, 1943; Bangassou
- Died: February 15, 2019 (aged 76)
- Education: Ecole pratique des Hautes Etudes de Paris X
- Occupations: Film director; actor; journalist
- Years active: 1975–2007

Joseph Akouissonne (1 January 1943 – 15 February 2019) was a Central African film director, actor, and journalist.

== Biography ==
=== Early life and education ===
Akouissone was born in Bangassou in 1943. He completed his secondary studies at the Lycée Technique de Bangui. Akouissone moved to France in 1965 to study mathematics and train as an engineer. Instead of continuing on this path, he took Audiovisual courses at the Ecole pratique des Hautes Etudes de Paris X and did a postgraduate thesis under Jean Roach on ethnography. Akouissone made an unfinished film about a potter from Sauveteur de Rouergue.

=== Career ===
In 1975, he directed his first short film, Josepha, on the theme of Black women in Europe. On assignment from the Upper Volta Ministry of Cooperation, Akouissone directed Festival de Royan in 1977, a half-hour short film about the troupes of musicians and dancers at the eponymous festival. In 1980, he produced Dieux Noirs du State for French television, covering three footballers and a basketball player. The following year, Akouissone directed the first documentary filmed in the Central African Republic, Un homme est un homme. In 1982, Akouissone directed Zo Kwè Zo, which received the prize for the best picture at the eighth Panafrican Film and Television Festival of Ouagadougou as well as the prize of the international TV Cinema Commission, awarded from UNESCO.

During the 1980s, he worked for France 3 Limousin. He retired in 2007, but remained active in retirement, writing a blog and denouncing violence in editorials. Akouissone died on 17 February 2019 at the age of 76.

== Partial filmography ==
- 1975: Josepha (director)
- 1977: Festival de Royan (director)
- 1978: Safrana or Freedom of Speech (actor)
- 1980: Dieux Noirs du State (director)
- 1981: Un homme est un homme (director)
- 1982: Zo Kwè Zo (director)
- 1985: Burkina Cinema (director)
- 1987: FESPACO Images 87 (director)
- 1989: Africa Cinema (director)
