= Elephant Path: Njaia Njoku =

2018 Central African documentary film

- Directed by: Todd McGrain
- Written by: Todd McGrain
- Produced by: Todd McGrain; Scott Anger
- Cinematography: Scott Anger
- Edited by: Sara Khaki
- Release date: 10 June 2018
- Running time: 80 minutes
- Countries: United States; Central African Republic; Israel
- Language: English

Elephant Path: Njaia Njoku, is a 2018 Central African documentary film directed by Todd McGrain and co-produced by McGrain and Scott Anger. The film revolves around an unlikely alliance made by an American biologist, a Bayaka tracker, a Bantu eco-guard, and an Israeli security contractor where they started to protect the last wild herd of forest elephants of Central African Republic.

The film premiered on 10 June 2018 at DOC NYC. The film received positive reviews from critics and screened in many film festivals. In 2019 at the Richmond International Film Festival, the documentary won the Best of Festival Award for the Documentary Feature. The film was also had many special screening world-wide: National Museum of American History in Washington, DC, NYU Law School, Santa Cruz Film Festival, Community Screening at Penn State University, Green Screen International Wildlife Film Festival, LoKo Arts Festival, Princeton Environmental Film Festival etc. In 2019 at the Wisconsin Film Festival, the film won the Golden Badger Award and then won the Best Feature Film Award at the Portland EcoFilm Fest.
