= Ahia Njoku =

Goddess worshipped by the Igbo people of Nigeria

In Igbo mythology, Ahia Njoku, also known as Ifejioku, Aha Njoku, is a goddess worshipped by the Igbo people of Nigeria.

She is responsible for yams, which were an important ingredient in the Igbo diet, and the men who care for them (Farming yams is a traditionally male job in the Igbo tribe unless one is weeding or harvesting). Ahia Njoku's name would often be called upon to settle altercations between Igbo people regarding ownership of farmland or agricultural conflicts.

The Ahanjoku Festival is celebrated among the Igbo people on a full moon before the New Yam Festival. It is an elaborate festival in which sacrifices and offerings are made to Ahia Njoku to ensure a healthy yam harvest in the following season. Until the ceremony is carried out, newly harvested yams are not consumed. In addition to the ceremony, the accompanying festival is a time of social gathering and celebration amongst Igbo people.

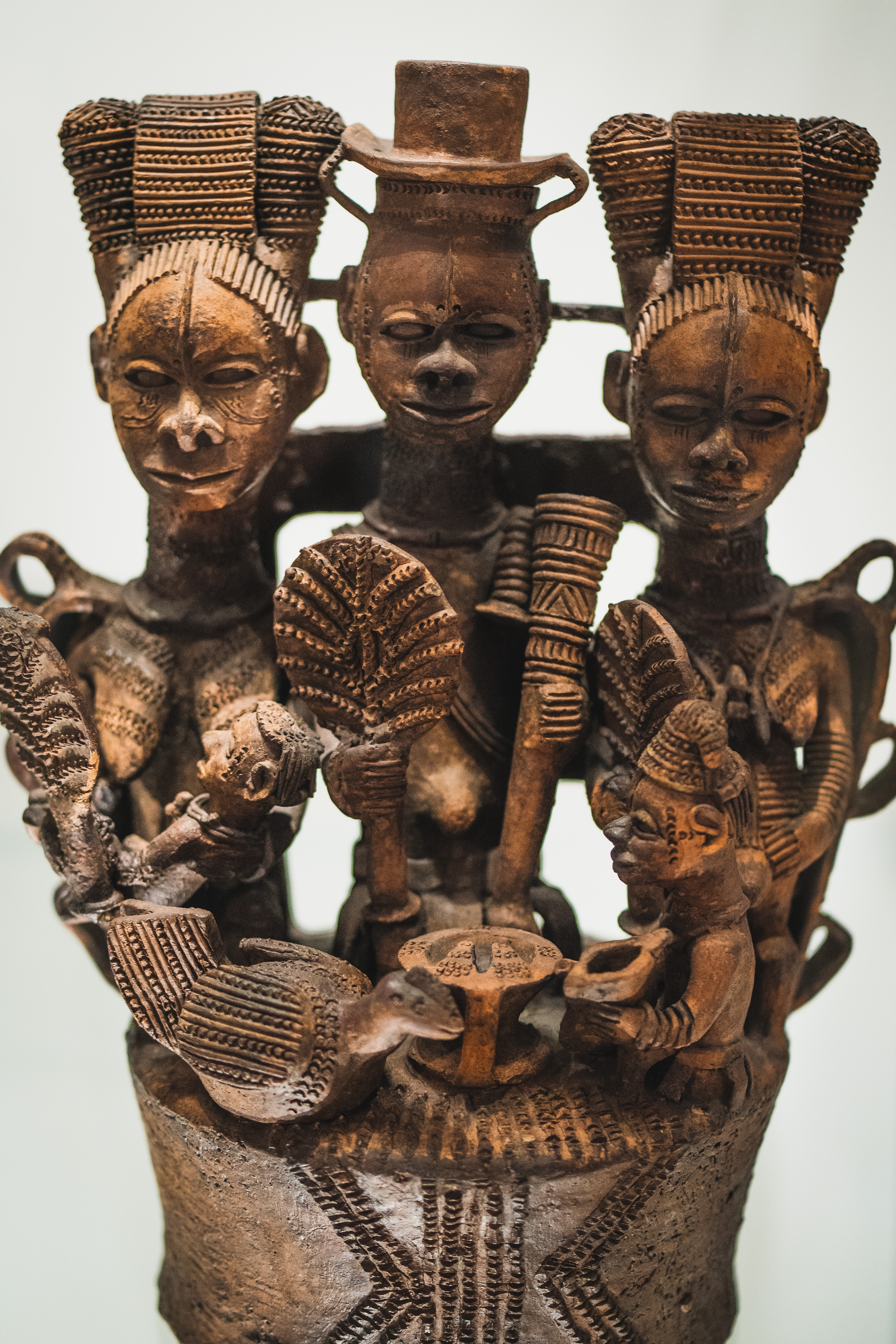
Example of an offering made to Ahia Njoku during the Ahanjoku festival.

In some parts children who were dedicated to the service of the deity were named Njoku. As adults, such children were expected to become prosperous yam farmers, which made them into nobility.

== See also ==
Njoku Ji
