= Njoku Ji =

Patron deity of the Yam in the Igbo religion

- Alusi of yam

Njoku Ji is the guardian deity of the yam for the Igbo people of southeastern Nigeria. In parts of Igboland there are still annual rituals in honor of the yam deity known as Ifejioku. In some parts children who were dedicated to the service of the deity were named Njoku. As adults, such children were expected to become prosperous yam farmers which made them into nobility.

== Ihu-ji na-ama festival ==
The priests of Njoku Ji performed ceremonies such as the Ihu-ji na-ama, where the priest would lead the village council of elders in roasting yams in the village square. The Ihu-ji na-ama festival acted as the beginning of the yam planting season, and in fact, no yams were allowed to be planted before this ceremony had been performed, with the consequences of planting yams early being a curse of bad luck upon the offender and his household.

== See also ==
- Ahia Njoku
