= Lists of World Heritage Sites =

Logo of the UNESCO World Heritage Committee

The United Nations Educational, Scientific and Cultural Organization (UNESCO) World Heritage Sites are places of importance to cultural or natural heritage as described in the UNESCO World Heritage Convention, established in 1972. Cultural heritage consists of monuments (such as architectural works, monumental sculptures, or inscriptions), groups of buildings, and sites (including archaeological sites). Natural heritage consists of natural features (physical and biological formations), geological and physiographical formations (including habitats of threatened species of animals and plants), and natural sites which are important from the point of view of science, conservation, or natural beauty. UNESCO lists sites under ten criteria; each entry must meet at least one of the criteria. Criteria i through vi are cultural, and vii through x are natural. In addition to sites inscribed on the World Heritage List, member states can maintain a list of tentative sites that they may consider for nomination. Nominations for the World Heritage List are only accepted if the site was previously listed on the tentative list.

== General lists ==
- Former UNESCO World Heritage Sites
- List of World Heritage in Danger
- List of World Heritage Sites by year of inscription
- List of World Heritage Sites by religion
- World Heritage Earthen Architecture Programme#Sites

== Lists by UNESCO geoscheme ==
=== Africa ===
- List of World Heritage Sites in Angola
- List of World Heritage Sites in Benin
- List of World Heritage Sites in Burkina Faso
- List of World Heritage Sites in Cameroon
- List of World Heritage Sites in Cabo Verde
- List of World Heritage Sites in Central African Republic
- List of World Heritage Sites in Chad
- List of World Heritage Sites in Côte d'Ivoire
- List of World Heritage Sites in Djibouti
- List of World Heritage Sites in Gambia
- List of World Heritage Sites in Ghana
- List of World Heritage Sites in Guinea
- List of World Heritage Sites in Guinea-Bissau
- List of World Heritage Sites in Liberia
- List of World Heritage Sites in Mali
- List of World Heritage Sites in Mauritania
- List of World Heritage Sites in Niger
- List of World Heritage Sites in Nigeria
- List of World Heritage Sites in Senegal
- List of World Heritage Sites in Sierra Leone
- List of World Heritage Sites in Togo
- List of World Heritage Sites in the Republic of the Congo
- List of World Heritage Sites in the DR Congo
- List of World Heritage Sites in Gabon
- List of World Heritage Sites in São Tomé and Príncipe
- List of World Heritage Sites in Burundi
- List of World Heritage Sites in Comoros
- List of World Heritage Sites in Eritrea
- List of World Heritage Sites in Ethiopia
- List of World Heritage Sites in Kenya
- List of World Heritage Sites in Madagascar
- List of World Heritage Sites in Malawi
- List of World Heritage Sites in Mauritius
- List of World Heritage Sites in Mozambique
- List of World Heritage Sites in Rwanda
- List of World Heritage Sites in Seychelles
- List of World Heritage Sites in Somalia
- List of World Heritage Sites in South Sudan
- List of World Heritage Sites in Tanzania
- List of World Heritage Sites in Uganda
- List of World Heritage Sites in Zambia
- List of World Heritage Sites in Zimbabwe
- List of World Heritage Sites in Botswana
- List of World Heritage Sites in Eswatini
- List of World Heritage Sites in Lesotho
- List of World Heritage Sites in Namibia
- List of World Heritage Sites in South Africa

=== Latin America and the Caribbean ===
- List of World Heritage Sites in Antigua and Barbuda
- List of World Heritage Sites in Barbados
- List of World Heritage Sites in Cuba
- List of World Heritage Sites in Dominica
- List of World Heritage Sites in Dominican Republic
- List of World Heritage Sites in Haiti
- List of World Heritage Sites in Jamaica
- List of World Heritage Sites in Saint Kitts and Nevis
- List of World Heritage Sites in Saint Lucia
- List of World Heritage Sites in Belize
- List of World Heritage Sites in Costa Rica
- List of World Heritage Sites in El Salvador
- List of World Heritage Sites in Guatemala
- List of World Heritage Sites in Honduras
- List of World Heritage Sites in Mexico
- List of World Heritage Sites in Nicaragua
- List of World Heritage Sites in Panama
- List of World Heritage Sites in Argentina
- List of World Heritage Sites in Bolivia
- List of World Heritage Sites in Brazil
- List of World Heritage Sites in Chile
- List of World Heritage Sites in Colombia
- List of World Heritage Sites in Ecuador
- List of World Heritage Sites in Guyana
- List of World Heritage Sites in Peru
- List of World Heritage Sites in Suriname
- List of World Heritage Sites in Uruguay
- List of World Heritage Sites in Venezuela

=== Arab states ===
- List of World Heritage Sites in Algeria
- List of World Heritage Sites in Bahrain
- List of World Heritage Sites in Egypt
- List of World Heritage Sites in Libya
- List of World Heritage Sites in Morocco
- List of World Heritage Sites in Sudan
- List of World Heritage Sites in Tunisia
- List of World Heritage Sites in Iraq
- List of World Heritage Sites in the United Arab Emirates
- List of World Heritage Sites in Yemen
- List of World Heritage Sites in Jordan
- List of World Heritage Sites in Kuwait
- List of World Heritage Sites in Lebanon
- List of World Heritage Sites in Oman
- List of World Heritage Sites in Palestine
- List of World Heritage Sites in Qatar
- List of World Heritage Sites in Saudi Arabia
- List of World Heritage Sites in Syria

=== Asia and the Pacific ===
- List of World Heritage Sites in China
- List of World Heritage Sites in Japan
- List of World Heritage Sites in Mongolia
- List of World Heritage Sites in North Korea
- List of World Heritage Sites in South Korea
- List of World Heritage Sites in Kazakhstan
- List of World Heritage Sites in Kyrgyzstan
- List of World Heritage Sites in Tajikistan
- List of World Heritage Sites in Turkmenistan
- List of World Heritage Sites in Uzbekistan
- List of World Heritage Sites in Cambodia
- List of World Heritage Sites in Indonesia
- List of World Heritage Sites in Laos
- List of World Heritage Sites in Malaysia
- List of World Heritage Sites in Myanmar
- List of World Heritage Sites in the Philippines
- List of World Heritage Sites in Singapore
- List of World Heritage Sites in Thailand
- List of World Heritage Sites in Vietnam
- List of World Heritage Sites in Afghanistan
- List of World Heritage Sites in Bangladesh
- List of World Heritage Sites in Bhutan
- List of World Heritage Sites in India
- List of World Heritage Sites in Iran
- List of World Heritage Sites in Nepal
- List of World Heritage Sites in Pakistan
- List of World Heritage Sites in Sri Lanka
- List of World Heritage Sites in Armenia
- List of World Heritage Sites in Azerbaijan
- List of World Heritage Sites in Georgia
- List of World Heritage Sites in Australia
- List of World Heritage Sites in New Zealand
- List of World Heritage Sites in Fiji
- List of World Heritage Sites in Papua New Guinea
- List of World Heritage Sites in Solomon Islands
- List of World Heritage Sites in Vanuatu
- List of World Heritage Sites in Kiribati
- List of World Heritage Sites in the Marshall Islands
- List of World Heritage Sites in Micronesia
- List of World Heritage Sites in Palau

=== Europe and North America ===
- List of World Heritage Sites in Austria
- List of World Heritage Sites in Albania
- List of World Heritage Sites in Andorra
- List of World Heritage Sites in Belarus
- List of World Heritage Sites in Belgium
- List of World Heritage Sites in Bosnia and Herzegovina
- List of World Heritage Sites in Bulgaria
- List of World Heritage Sites in Canada
- List of World Heritage Sites in Croatia
- List of World Heritage Sites in the Czech Republic
- List of World Heritage Sites in Denmark
- List of World Heritage Sites in Estonia
- List of World Heritage Sites in Finland
- List of World Heritage Sites in France
- List of World Heritage Sites in Germany
- List of World Heritage Sites in Greece
- List of World Heritage Sites in Hungary
- List of World Heritage Sites in Iceland
- List of World Heritage Sites in Ireland
- List of World Heritage Sites in Israel
- List of World Heritage Sites in Italy
- List of World Heritage Sites in Latvia
- List of World Heritage Sites in Lithuania
- List of World Heritage Sites in Luxembourg
- List of World Heritage Sites in Malta
- List of World Heritage Sites in Moldova
- List of World Heritage Sites in Montenegro
- List of World Heritage Sites in the Netherlands
- List of World Heritage Sites in North Macedonia
- List of World Heritage Sites in Norway
- List of World Heritage Sites in Poland
- List of World Heritage Sites in Portugal
- List of World Heritage Sites in Romania
- List of World Heritage Sites in Russia
- List of World Heritage Sites in San Marino
- List of World Heritage Sites in Serbia
- List of World Heritage Sites in Slovakia
- List of World Heritage Sites in Slovenia
- List of World Heritage Sites in Spain
- List of World Heritage Sites in Sweden
- List of World Heritage Sites in Switzerland
- List of World Heritage Sites in Turkey
- List of World Heritage Sites in Ukraine
- List of World Heritage Sites in the United Kingdom
- List of World Heritage Sites in the United States
- List of World Heritage Sites in Cyprus
- Vatican City is itself a World Heritage Site

== See also ==
- UNESCO Intangible Cultural Heritage Lists
