= List of World Heritage Sites in Guyana =

The United Nations Educational, Scientific and Cultural Organization (UNESCO) World Heritage Sites are places of importance to cultural or natural heritage nominated by signatory countries to the World Heritage Convention of 1972. Cultural heritage comprises monuments (such as architectural works, monumental sculptures, or inscriptions), groups of buildings, and sites (including archaeological ones). Natural heritage comprises natural features (such as physical and biological formations), geological and physiographical formations (including habitats of threatened flora and fauna), and natural sites which are important for scientific research, conservation or natural aesthetic. Guyana accepted the convention on 20 June 1977, making its cultural and natural heritage sites eligible for inclusion on the list. There are no World Heritage Sites in the country, but there are five on the tentative list.

== Tentative list ==
UNESCO lists sites under ten criteria; each entry must meet at least one of the criteria. Criteria i through vi are cultural, and vii through x are natural. In addition to sites inscribed on the World Heritage List, member states can maintain a list of tentative sites for nomination consideration. Nominations for the list are only accepted if the site had been on the tentative list. Guyana has five properties on its tentative list.

World Heritage Sites
Site	Image	Location (region)	UNESCO data	Year listed	Description
St. Georges Anglican Cathedral		Demerara-Mahaica	i (cultural)	1995	
Fort Zeelandia (including Court of Policy Building)	alt-The Court of Policy building has a path, with plants on both sides, leading up to it.	Essequibo Islands-West Demerara	iii (cultural)	1995	
City Hall, Georgetown		Demerara-Mahaica	i (cultural)	1995	
Shell Beach (Almond Beach) Essequibo Coast	Coconut trees on Shell Beach, some have fallen	Barima-Waini	x (natural)	1995	
Georgetown's Plantation Structure and Historic Buildings		Demerara-Mahaica	ii, iv, v (cultural)	2005	

== See also ==
- List of World Heritage Sites in South America
  - List of World Heritage Sites in Venezuela
  - List of World Heritage Sites in Brazil
  - List of World Heritage Sites in Suriname
