= List of World Heritage Sites in Cameroon =

Location of World Heritage Sites in Cameroon. Blue dots represent natural sites, the red dot is a cultural site.

The United Nations Educational, Scientific and Cultural Organization (UNESCO) World Heritage Sites are places of importance to cultural or natural heritage as described in the UNESCO World Heritage Convention, established in 1972. Cultural heritage consists of monuments (such as architectural works, monumental sculptures, or inscriptions), groups of buildings, and sites (including archaeological sites). Natural features (consisting of physical and biological formations), geological and physiographical formations (including habitats of threatened species of animals and plants), and natural sites which are important from the point of view of science, conservation, or natural beauty, are defined as natural heritage. Cameroon accepted the convention on December 7, 1987, making its historical sites eligible for inclusion on the list. As of 2025, Cameroon has three World Heritage Sites, one of which – Sangha Trinational – is transnational and shared with the Central African Republic and Republic of the Congo.

== World Heritage Sites ==
UNESCO lists sites under ten criteria; each entry must meet at least one of the criteria. Criteria i through vi are cultural, and vii through x are natural.

* Transnational site

World Heritage Sites
Site	Image	Location (region)	Year listed	UNESCO data	Description
Dja Faunal Reserve		East Region, South Region	1987	407; ix, x (natural)	This is one of the largest and best-protected rainforests in Africa, with 90% of its area left undisturbed. Almost completely surrounded by the Dja River, which forms a natural boundary, the reserve is especially noted for its biodiversity and a wide variety of primates. It contains 107 mammal species, five of which are threatened.
Sangha Trinational		East Region	2012	1380rev; ix, x (natural)	Situated in the north-western Congo Basin, where Cameroon, Central African Republic and Congo meet, the site encompasses three contiguous national parks totalling around 750,000 ha. Much of the site is unaffected by human activity and features a wide range of humid tropical forest ecosystems with rich flora and fauna, including Nile crocodiles and goliath tigerfish, a large predator. Forest clearings support herbaceous species and Sangha is home to considerable populations of forest elephants, critically endangered western lowland gorilla, and endangered chimpanzee. The site’s environment has preserved the continuation of ecological and evolutionary processes on a huge scale and great biodiversity, including many endangered animal species.
Diy-Gid-Biy Cultural Landscape of the Mandara Mountains		Far North Region	2025	1745; iii (cultural)	Located in the Far North Region of Cameroon, the property includes sixteen archaeological sites across seven villages. Known as Diy-Gid-Biy (meaning “Ruin of the Chief’s Residence” in the Mafa language), these dry-stone architectural structures were likely built between the 12th and 17th centuries. While their original builders remain unknown, the area has been inhabited by the Mafa people since the 15th century. The surrounding landscape features agricultural terraces, homes, tombs, places of worship, and artisan activities, reflecting a long-standing cultural and spiritual connection between the people and their environment.

== Tentative List ==
In addition to sites inscribed on the World Heritage List, member states can maintain a list of tentative sites that they may consider for nomination. Nominations for the World Heritage List are only accepted if the site was previously listed on the tentative list. As of 2025, Cameroon has listed seventeen properties on its tentative list.

Tentative sites
Site	Image	Location (region)	Year listed	UNESCO criteria	Description
Boumba Bek and Nki National Parks Complex		East Region	2018	vii, ix, x	
Bouba Njida National Park		North Region	2018	ix, x (natural)	
Campo Ma'an National Park		South Region	2018	vii, viii, ix, x (natural)	
Waza National Park		Farth North Region	2018	ix, x (natural)	
The Bahut chiefdom		Northwest Region	2018	i, iii, v, vi (cultural)	
Tower of Goto Goulfey		Farth North Region	2018	i, iii (cultural)	
Bidzar petroglyphs		North Region	2018	i (cultural)	
Megaliths of Djohong		Centre Region	2018	i, iv, v (cultural)	
Megaliths of Saa		Centre Region	2018	iii, iv, v (cultural)	
Njock Rail Tunnels		Centre Region	2018	iv, vi (cultural)	
Palace of Rey Bouba		North Region	2018	i, ii, iii (cultural)	
Lobé Falls Cultural Landscape		South Region	2018	v, vi, vii (mixed)	
Shum Laka Archaeological Site		Northwest Region	2018	iii, iv, v (cultural)	
“Grandes Cases” of the traditional chiefdoms of the Grassfields region		North Region, Northwest Region	2018	ii (cultural)	
Lake Chad cultural landscape		Far North Region	2018	ii, iii, vii, ix (mixed)	
Cross River-Korup-Takamanda		Southwest Region	2020	ix, x (natural)	
Bimbia and associated sites		Southwest Region	2020	iii, vi (cultural)	
