= List of World Heritage Sites in the Congo =

Location of World Heritage Sites in the Republic of the Congo

The United Nations Educational, Scientific and Cultural Organization (UNESCO) World Heritage Sites are places of importance to cultural or natural heritage as described in the UNESCO World Heritage Convention, established in 1972. Cultural heritage consists of monuments (such as architectural works, monumental sculptures, or inscriptions), groups of buildings, and sites (including archaeological sites). Natural features (consisting of physical and biological formations), geological and physiographical formations (including habitats of threatened species of animals and plants), and natural sites which are important from the point of view of science, conservation or natural beauty, are defined as natural heritage. The Republic of the Congo accepted the convention on December 10, 1987, making its historical sites eligible for inclusion on the list. As of 2023, the Republic of the Congo has two World Heritage Sites. One of these, Sangha Trinational, is shared with the neighbouring countries of Cameroon and the Central African Republic.

== World Heritage Sites ==
UNESCO lists sites under ten criteria; each entry must meet at least one of the criteria. Criteria i through vi are cultural, and vii through x are natural.

* Transnational site

World Heritage Sites
Site	Image	Location (department)	Year listed	UNESCO data	Description
Sangha Trinational		Sangha Department, Likouala Department	2012	1380rev; ix, x (natural)	
Forest Massif of Odzala-Kokoua		Cuvette-Ouest Department	2023	692rev; ix, x (natural)	

== Tentative list ==
In addition to sites inscribed on the World Heritage List, member states can maintain a list of tentative sites that they may consider for nomination. Nominations for the World Heritage List are only accepted if the site was previously listed on the tentative list. The Republic of the Congo maintains three properties on its tentative list.

Tentative sites
Site	Image	Location (department)	Year listed	UNESCO criteria	Description
Loango ancient slavery harbour		Kouilou Department	2008	vi (cultural)	
Mbé Royal Domain		Pool Department	2008	v, vi (cultural)	
Conkouati-Douli National Park		Kouilou Department	2008	ix, x (natural)	
