= List of World Heritage Sites in the Central African Republic =

Location of World Heritage Sites in the Central African Republic

The United Nations Educational, Scientific and Cultural Organization (UNESCO) World Heritage Sites are places of importance to cultural or natural heritage as described in the UNESCO World Heritage Convention, established in 1972. Cultural heritage consists of monuments (such as architectural works, monumental sculptures, or inscriptions), groups of buildings, and sites (including archaeological sites). Natural features (consisting of physical and biological formations), geological and physiographical formations (including habitats of threatened species of animals and plants), and natural sites which are important from the point of view of science, conservation or natural beauty, are defined as natural heritage. The Central African Republic accepted the convention on 22 December 1980, making its historical sites eligible for inclusion on the list.

As of June 2025, the Central African Republic has two World Heritage Sites, both being natural heritage sites. One of them, Sangha Trinational, is a transnational site, being shared with the neighboring countries of Cameroon and the Democratic Republic of the Congo.

== World Heritage Sites ==
UNESCO lists sites under ten criteria; each entry must meet at least one of the criteria. Criteria i through vi are cultural, and vii through x are natural.

† In danger
* Transnational site

World Heritage Sites
Site	Image	Location (prefecture)	Year listed	UNESCO data	Description
Manovo-Gounda St. Floris National Park		Bamingui-Bangoran	1988	475; ix, x (natural)	Manovo-Gounda St. Floris National Park is the largest Central African national park consisting of savannah, comprising 1,740,000 hectares (17,400 km^{2}) of land.
Sangha Trinational		Sangha-Mbaéré	2012	1380rev; ix, x (natural)	

== Tentative List ==
In addition to sites inscribed on the World Heritage List, member states can maintain a list of tentative sites that they may consider for nomination. Nominations for the World Heritage List are only accepted if the site was previously listed on the tentative list. As of June 2025, Central African Republic has listed nine properties on its tentative list.

Tentative sites
Site	Image	Location (prefecture)	Year listed	UNESCO criteria	Description
The Bouar Megaliths		Nana-Mambéré	2006	(cultural)	
The Tata (fortified palace) of Sultan Sénoussi, the caves of Kaga-Kpoungouvou, and the city of Ndélé		Bamingui-Bangoran	2006	(cultural)	
Paleo-metallurgical sites of Bangui		Bangui	2006	(cultural)	
Lengo Petroglyphs		Mbomou	2006	(cultural)	
Remains of the Zinga train		Lobaye	2006	(cultural)	
Mbaéré Bodingué Integral Reserve		Sangha-Mbaéré	2006	ix, x (natural)	
Mbi Falls		Ombella-M'Poko	2006	vii (natural)	
Hill, plain, Oubangui river and the colonial heritage of Bangui		Lobaye	2006	(cultural)	
Pygmy forest and residential camps of Central African Republic		Lobaye	2006	x (mixed)	
