= List of World Heritage Sites in Denmark =

Locations of World Heritage Sites in Greenland
Locations of World Heritage Sites in Denmark. Red dots indicate cultural sites and green dots indicate natural sites.

The United Nations Educational, Scientific and Cultural Organization (UNESCO) World Heritage Sites are places of importance to cultural or natural heritage as described in the UNESCO World Heritage Convention, established in 1972. Denmark ratified the convention on 25 July 1979, making its historical sites eligible for inclusion on the list.

The first site in Denmark to be added to the list was Jelling Mounds, Runic Stones and Church, inscribed at the 18th Session of the World Heritage Committee, held in 1994 in Phuket, Thailand. Denmark has thirteen sites inscribed on the list and a further four on the tentative list. Three sites, Kujataa, Aasivissuit – Nipisat, and Ilulissat Icefjord, are located in Greenland, which is an autonomous territory within the Kingdom of Denmark.

Eight sites in Denmark are cultural and five are natural. The natural site Wadden Sea is shared with Germany and the Netherlands. In 2014, the Danish part of the site was added to the existing site in the other two countries, listed in 2009.

== World Heritage Sites ==
UNESCO lists sites under ten criteria; each entry must meet at least one of the criteria. Criteria i through vi are cultural, and vii through x are natural.

* Transnational site

Site	Image	Location	Year listed	UNESCO data	Description
Jelling Mounds, Runic Stones and Church	Two standing stones with runic inscriptions and figurative carvings	Region of Southern Denmark	1994	697; iii (cultural)	The monuments at Jelling include runestones, burial mounds, and a church. They document the Danish transition from Norse paganism to Christianity in the 10th century. The two burial mounds are pagan, as well as the older runestone, raised by king Gorm the Old. The larger runestone mentions the Christianization of Denmark and was raised by king Harald Bluetooth, who also erected the nearby church.
Roskilde Cathedral	Roskilde Cathedral, a brick building with two spires. Look from above.	Region Zealand	1995	695; ii, iv (cultural)	The construction of the cathedral started in the 12th century in Romanesque and continued in Gothic style in the 13th century. It is built in brick, thus an early example of a major ecclesiastical building built in this material in Northern Europe, and has been the main burial site for Danish monarchs since the 15th century.
Kronborg Castle	Kronborg Castle, a fortified brick structure, seen from a distance.	Capital Region	2000	696; iv (cultural)	The Renaissance castle, mostly built in the late 16th century, is strategically located at the narrowest point of the Øresund strait. It was destroyed by a fire in 1629 but rebuilt shortly after in almost precisely the same shape, with further military modification carried out in the following century. Kronborg, as Elsinore, is the setting of William Shakespeare's play Hamlet.
Ilulissat Icefjord	A massive iceberg in the sea full of smaller icebergs.	Avannaata, Greenland	2004	1149; vii, viii (natural)	Ilulissat Icefjord is one of the few places where the Greenland ice sheet meets the sea, in the Sermeq Kujalleq glacier. This is one of the most active glaciers in the world, which annually calves over 35 cubic kilometres (8.4 cu mi) of ice. It has been studied for over 250 years, providing insight into icecap glaciology and climate change.
Stevns Klint	A look at the cliff from Old Højerup Church	Region Zealand	2014	1416; viii (natural)	Stevns Klint is a 15 kilometres (9.3 mi) long coastal cliff, rich with fossils. It offers exceptional evidence of the impact of the Chicxulub meteorite that crashed into the planet at the end of the Cretaceous period, about 66 million years ago, causing the Cretaceous–Paleogene extinction event. The site also bears witness to the development of flora and fauna following the recovery after the mass extinction.
Wadden Sea*	Sea with birds flying above	Region of Southern Denmark	2014	1314; viii, ix, x (natural)	The Wadden Sea is the largest unbroken system of intertidal sand and mud flats in the world. It is an important biodiversity spot, harbouring species such as harbour seal, grey seal, and harbour porpoise. The sites in Germany and the Netherlands were inscribed to the World Heritage List in 2009, the site in Denmark was added in 2014.
Moravian Church Settlements*	A church building, a frontal view. A park with a fountain in front of the church.	Region of Southern Denmark	2015	1468bis; iii, iv (cultural)	Christiansfeld, founded in 1773, is an example of a planned settlement of the Moravian Church, a Protestant denomination, reflecting the egalitarian philosophy of the community. The settlement includes important buildings for the common welfare, such as communal houses for the congregation's widows and unmarried men and women. The site was originally listed independently under the name Christiansfeld, a Moravian Church Settlement. In 2024 the site was extended to include three additional Moravian church settlements, the Historic Moravian Bethlehem District in the United States, Herrnhut in Germany, and Gracehill in the United Kingdom.
The par force hunting landscape in North Zealand	A feeding station in Kægersborg Dyrehave, forest in the background	Capital Region	2015	1469; ii, iv (cultural)	The site encompasses two forests where Danish nobility practiced par force hunting, which is hunting with hounds. The peak activity was reached between the 17th and late 18th century. The forests were modified according to the Baroque landscape planning principles, with hunting lanes laid out in a star system, featuring additional fences, orientation points, and hunting lodges.
Kujataa Greenland: Norse and Inuit Farming at the Edge of the Ice Cap	Hvalsey Church ruins	Kujalleq, Greenland	2017	1536; v (cultural)	Kujataa is a farming landscape in Southern Greenland which was shaped by two cultures—by Norsemen between the 10th and 15th century, and Inuit since the 18th century. Although the two cultures are distinct, both relied on a combination of farming, pastoralism and hunting of marine mammals.
Aasivissuit – Nipisat: Inuit Hunting Ground between Ice and Sea	–	Qeqqata, Greenland	2018	1557; v (cultural)	The area contains evidence of 4200 years of human history, connected to hunting of marine and land animals, such as the caribou. Archaeological sites can be dated to various periods, including Saqqaq (2500-700 BC), Dorset (800 BC-1 AD), Thule Inuit (from the 13th century) and colonial periods (from the 18th century).
Viking Age Ring Fortresses	Trelleborg ring fortress from above	Regions North Jutland, Southern Denmark and Zealand	2023	1660; iii, iv (cultural)	These five fortresses, all following the same standard circular shape, were built in a very short time window, around 975–80, during the reign of king Harald Bluetooth. Since they functioned for only a short period of time and were later mostly undisturbed, they provide an important insight into the Viking Age Denmark.
Møns Klint	A cliff made of chalk	Region Zealand	2025	1728; viii (natural)	The chalk cliffs, rising 120 m (390 ft) above the sea level, were created during the Last Glacial Maximum when the glaciers deformed and pushed up the underlying bedrock. Different stages of this glaciotectonic process are visible.
The Bony Fish Fossils of the Western Limfjord – Evolution and Climate Adaptation in the Earliest Eocene	Hanklit cliff, look from above	North Jutland Region	2026	1758; viii (natural)	This nomination comprises two fossiliferous areas, Hanklit (pictured) and Knudeklint, located on the islands of Mors and Fur in Limfjord, respectively. The fossils found on the two sites provide insight into life in the Lower Eocene, 56 to 55 million years ago, both marine and terrestrial environments. Especially interesting are the fossils of ray-finned fish that demonstrate the adaptation and diversification of fish following the Cretaceous–Paleogene (K–Pg) extinction event.

== Tentative list ==
In addition to sites inscribed on the World Heritage list, member states can maintain a list of tentative sites that they may consider for nomination. Nominations for the World Heritage list are only accepted if the site was previously listed on the tentative list. Denmark has four sites on its tentative list.

Site	Image	Location	Year listed	UNESCO criteria	Description
Amalienborg and its district	Amalienborg, look at the square from above	Capital Region	1993	i, ii, iv (cultural)	Amalienborg was built in the 18th century as an extension of medieval Copenhagen. The main square contains four identical palaces, designed by Niels Eigtved in the Rococo style for chosen noble families. The equestrian statue of king Frederick V is erected in the middle.
The Maritime Heritage of Dragør Old Town and Harbour - A ‘skipper-town’ from the era of the great tall ships in the 18th and 19th centuries	Dragør Harbour panorama with boats and houses	Capital Region	2019	ii, iii, iv, v (cultural)	The town of Dragør is strategically located on the coast of the Øresund strait. Both the well-preserved Old Town and the Harbour bear testimony to the time when Denmark was an important seafaring nation, with ships from Dragør sailing not only to the Baltic and Northern Europe but also to the Americas, Africa, and Asia.
Seaweed Houses and Sea-salt Huts, Laesoe Island	An old house thatched with seaweed	North Jutland Region	2023	iii, v (cultural)	This nomination comprises properties that illustrate the life of people on a small island of Laesoe in the Kattegat strait from the early Middle Ages to the mid-20th century. Between the 12th and 16th centuries, the islanders practiced open-pan salt production from saline groundwater that required burning lots of wood, eventually leading to deforestation. Two clusters of houses thatched with seaweed, up to 2 m (6 ft 7 in) (example pictured), represent a particular building expression as a result of previous unsustainable use of resources.
Workers’ Assembly Halls (Denmark)*	A long five-storey building with many windows	Capital Region	2023	iii, iv, vi (cultural)	This transnational nomination comprises buildings in Australia, Argentina, and Denmark related to the international democratic labour movement and mass organisation of workers from 1850 onward. They were purpose-built to serve as meeting places and contained several meeting rooms for assemblies, political, and communal events, offices, often kitchens, printing presses, and businesses. The Workers’ Assembly Hall in Copenhagen, built in 1879, is nominated in Denmark. In 1982, the building was converted to The Workers Museum.
