= List of World Heritage Sites in Barbados =

Location of World Heritage Sites in Barbados

The United Nations Educational, Scientific and Cultural Organization (UNESCO) World Heritage Sites are places of importance to cultural or natural heritage as described in the UNESCO World Heritage Convention, established in 1972. Cultural heritage consists of monuments (such as architectural works, monumental sculptures, or inscriptions), groups of buildings, and sites (including archaeological sites). Natural features (consisting of physical and biological formations), geological and physiographical formations (including habitats of threatened species of animals and plants), and natural sites which are important from the point of view of science, conservation, or natural beauty, are defined as natural heritage. Barbados accepted the convention on April 9, 2002, making its historical sites eligible for inclusion on the list. As of 2025, Barbados has only one World Heritage Site, Historic Bridgetown and its Garrison, which was inscribed in 2011.

== World Heritage Sites ==
UNESCO lists sites under ten criteria; each entry must meet at least one of the criteria. Criteria i through vi are cultural, and vii through x are natural.

World Heritage Sites
Site	Image	Location (parish)	Year listed	UNESCO data	Description
Historic Bridgetown and its Garrison	The white parliament building of Barbados, flying the Barbadian national, with people walking to its side.	Saint Michael Parish	2011	1376; ii, iii, iv (cultural)	Historic Bridgetown and its Garrison, an outstanding example of British colonial architecture consisting of a well-preserved old town built in the 17th, 18th and 19th centuries, which testifies to the spread of Great Britain's Atlantic colonial empire. The property also includes a nearby military garrison which consists of numerous historic buildings. With its serpentine urban lay-out the property testifies to a different approach to colonial town-planning compared to the Spanish and Dutch colonial cities of the region which were built along a grid plan.

== Tentative list ==
In addition to sites inscribed on the World Heritage List, member states can maintain a list of tentative sites that they may consider for nomination. Nominations for the World Heritage List are only accepted if the site was previously listed on the tentative list. Barbados lists two properties on its tentative list.

Tentative sites
Site	Image	Location (parish)	Year listed	UNESCO criteria	Description
The Scotland District of Barbados		Saint Andrew Parish, Saint Joseph Parish, Saint John Parish, Saint Thomas Parish	2005	(natural)	
The Industrial Heritage of Barbados: The Story of Sugar and Rum		Christ Church Parish, Saint Andrew Parish, Saint John Parish, Saint Lucy Parish, Saint Peter Parish	2014	ii, iii, iv (cultural)	
