= List of World Heritage Sites in El Salvador =

Location of World Heritage Sites in El Salvador

The United Nations Educational, Scientific and Cultural Organization (UNESCO) World Heritage Sites are places of importance to cultural or natural heritage as described in the UNESCO World Heritage Convention, established in 1972. Cultural heritage consists of monuments (such as architectural works, monumental sculptures, or inscriptions), groups of buildings, and sites (including archaeological sites). Natural features (consisting of physical and biological formations), geological and physiographical formations (including habitats of threatened species of animals and plants), and natural sites which are important from the point of view of science, conservation or natural beauty, are defined as natural heritage. El Salvador accepted the convention on October 8, 1991, making its historical sites eligible for inclusion on the list. As of 2024, El Salvador has only one World Heritage Site, Joya de Cerén, which was inscribed in 1993.

== World Heritage Sites ==
UNESCO lists sites under ten criteria; each entry must meet at least one of the criteria. Criteria i through vi are cultural, and vii through x are natural.

World Heritage Sites
Site	Image	Location (department)	Year listed	UNESCO data	Description
Joya de Cerén Archaeological Site		La Libertad Department	iii, iv (cultural)	1993	Joya de Cerén was a pre-Hispanic farming community that, like Pompeii and Herculaneum in Italy, was buried under an eruption of the Laguna Caldera volcano c. AD 600. Because of the exceptional condition of the remains, they provide an insight into the daily lives of the Central American populations who worked the land at that time.

== Tentative list ==
In addition to sites inscribed on the World Heritage List, member states can maintain a list of tentative sites that they may consider for nomination. Nominations for the World Heritage List are only accepted if the site was previously listed on the tentative list. As of 2023, El Salvador has listed six properties on its tentative list.

Tentative sites
Site	Image	Location (department)	Year listed	UNESCO criteria	Description
Gulf of Fonseca		La Unión Department	1992	(mixed)	
Cara Sucia / El Imposible		Ahuachapán Department	1992	(mixed)	
Chalchuapa		Santa Ana Department	1992	ii, iii (cultural)	
Ciudad Vieja / La Bermuda		Cuscatlán Department	1992	(cultural)	
Lake Güija		Santa Ana Department	1992	(mixed)	
Cacaopera		Morazán Department	1992	iii, iv (cultural)	
