= List of World Heritage Sites in Costa Rica =

Location of World Heritage Sites in Costa Rica. Cocos Island, located around 550 kilometres (340 mi) off the mainland in the Pacific Ocean, is not shown on the map.

The United Nations Educational, Scientific and Cultural Organization (UNESCO) World Heritage Sites are places of importance to cultural or natural heritage as described in the UNESCO World Heritage Convention, established in 1972. Cultural heritage consists of monuments (such as architectural works, monumental sculptures, or inscriptions), groups of buildings, and sites (including archaeological sites). Natural features (consisting of physical and biological formations), geological and physiographical formations (including habitats of threatened species of animals and plants), and natural sites which are important from the point of view of science, conservation, or natural beauty, are defined as natural heritage. Costa Rica ratified the convention on 23 August 1977. It has four World Heritage Sites and one site on the tentative list.

The first site in Costa Rica listed was the Talamanca Range-La Amistad Reserves / La Amistad National Park, in 1983. In 1990, the site was expanded to include the sites across the border in Panama. The most recent site listed was the Precolumbian Chiefdom Settlements with Stone Spheres of the Diquís, in 2014. This is the only cultural site in Costa Rica, the other three are listed for their natural properties. There is one site on the tentative list.

== World Heritage Sites ==
UNESCO lists sites under ten criteria; each entry must meet at least one of the criteria. Criteria i through vi are cultural, and vii through x are natural.

* Transnational site

World Heritage Sites
Site	Image	Location (province)	Year listed	UNESCO data	Description
Talamanca Range-La Amistad Reserves / La Amistad National Park*	Tropical rainforest scenery	Puntarenas	1983	205bis; vii, viii, ix, x (natural)	Being located at the meeting point between the North and South American flora and fauna, the area is rich in biodiversity, with about 10,000 flowering plants, over 200 species of mammals, about 600 species of birds, and 250 species of reptiles and amphibians. Most of the land is covered by tropical rainforests, however there are also several mountains reaching above 3,000 metres (9,800 ft). The glacial activity during the Quaternary glaciation shaped the landscape by creating cirques, valleys, and glacial lakes. The Costa Rican part of the site was initially listed independently in 1983, the part in Panama was added in 1990.
Cocos Island National Park	Tropical rainforest and a beach	Puntarenas	1997	820bis; ix, x (natural)	The island, around 550 kilometres (340 mi) off the mainland, is located at the meeting point of the Equatorial Counter Current and other currents. It supports the only tropical rainforest on an oceanic island in the eastern Pacific and is home to several endemic species, including three bird and two reptile species. The surrounding sea is of crucial importance for large pelagic species, such as the silky shark, lemon shark, hammerhead shark, whale shark, giant manta ray, and blue marlin. The islets in the area serve as the cleaning stations where these species rest to have their parasites removed by specialized fish. A significant boundary modification took place in 2002.
Area de Conservación Guanacaste	Grassy landscape with a volcanic peak in the background	Guanacaste, Alajuela	1999	928bis; ix, x (natural)	Stretching from the Pacific coast across Rincón de la Vieja, a mountain range with a highest peak of 1,916 metres (6,286 ft) (pictured), to the lowlands on the Caribbean side, the area comprises numerous habitats. There are important tracts of tropical dry forests in addition to wetlands, coasts, oak forests, and savannahs. The area is remarkably rich in biodiversity, with tens of thousands of insect species, in addition to large mammals such as the Baird's tapir, jaguar, margay, and ocelot. There are over 500 bird species, including the endangered mangrove hummingbird and great green macaw. A significant modification of the site boundaries took place in 2004.
Precolumbian Chiefdom Settlements with Stone Spheres of the Diquís	People looking at large stone spheres	Puntarenas	2014	1453; iii (cultural)	The pre-Columbian Diquis culture existed from 500 to 1500 CE in the delta of the Térraba River. The World Heritage Site comprises four archaeological sites with material remains from the culture. They include artificial mounds, burial sites, paved areas, and, most prominently, large stone spheres. Some of the spheres reach more than 2.5 metres (8 ft 2 in) in diameter. The sites remained safe from looting due to thick layers of sediments that covered them after the Diquis people dissipated.

== Tentative list ==
In addition to sites inscribed on the World Heritage List, member states can maintain a list of tentative sites that they may consider for nomination. Nominations for the World Heritage List are only accepted if the site was previously listed on the tentative list. Costa Rica has one property on its tentative list.

Tentative sites
Site	Image	Location (province)	Year listed	UNESCO criteria	Description
Corcovado National Park and Isla del Caño Biological Reserve	Ocean beach with palm trees	Puntarenas	2003	vii, x (natural)	No description provided in the nomination documentation. The Corcovado National Park is pictured.

== See also ==
- Culture of Costa Rica
