= List of World Heritage Sites in Djibouti =

The United Nations Educational, Scientific and Cultural Organization (UNESCO) World Heritage Sites are places of importance to cultural or natural heritage as described in the UNESCO World Heritage Convention, established in 1972. Cultural heritage comprises monuments (such as architectural works, monumental sculptures, or inscriptions), groups of buildings, and sites (including archaeological ones). Natural heritage comprises natural features (such as physical and biological formations), geological and physiographical formations (including habitats of threatened flora and fauna), and natural sites which are important for scientific research, conservation or natural aesthetic. Djibouti accepted the convention, making its historical sites eligible for inclusion on the list. As of 2025, Djibouti has no World Heritage Sites, although it has 10 sites on the tentative list.

== Tentative list ==
UNESCO lists sites under ten criteria; each entry must meet at least one of the criteria. Criteria i through vi are cultural, and vii through x are natural. In addition to sites inscribed on the World Heritage List, member states can maintain a list of tentative sites for nomination consideration. Nominations for the list are only accepted if the site had been on the tentative list. Djibouti has 10 properties on its tentative list.

World Heritage Sites
Site	Image	Location (region)	Year listed	UNESCO criteria	Description
The Tumulus (Awellos)		Ali Sabieh Region and Tadjourah Regions	2015	iii, iv (cultural)	
The Rock Engravings of Abourma		Tadjourah Region	2015	i, iii (cultural)	
The historic urban landscape of Djibouti City and its specific buildings	Stone buildings as seen from a balcony	Djibouti Region	2015	ii, iv (cultural)	
Lake Assal	A beach on a sunny day with mountains in the distance	Tadjourah Region	2015	vii, viii, x (natural)	
Moucha and Maskali Islands	Seagulls gathered under a chair on a beach	Djibouti Region	2015	viii, ix, x (natural)	
The Natural Landscapes of the Obock Region	A grassy woodland during sunset	Obock Region	2015	vii, viii, x (natural)	
Day Forest National Park	A canyon covered in vegetation and bordered by hills of striped rock on a foggy day	Tadjourah Region	2015	ix, x (natural)	
Assamo Terrestrial Protected Area		Ali Sabieh Region	2015	x (natural)	
Djalélo Protected Natural Area		Arta Region	2015	x (natural)	
Lake Abbeh: its cultural landscape, natural monuments, and ecosystem	A lake seen from very far inland, the beach has collections of rocks and land can be seen in the distance	Dikhil Region	2015	iii, vii, viii, x (mixed)	
