= List of World Heritage Sites in the Marshall Islands =

Location of the World Heritage Site in Marshall Island

The United Nations Educational, Scientific and Cultural Organization (UNESCO) World Heritage Sites are places of importance to cultural or natural heritage as described in the UNESCO World Heritage Convention, established in 1972. Cultural heritage consists of monuments (such as architectural works, monumental sculptures, or inscriptions), groups of buildings, and sites (including archaeological sites). Natural features (consisting of physical and biological formations), geological and physiographical formations (including habitats of threatened species of animals and plants), and natural sites which are important from the point of view of science, conservation or natural beauty, are defined as natural heritage. The Marshall Islands accepted the convention on April 24, 2002, making its historical sites eligible for inclusion on the list. As of 2025, the Marshall Islands has only one World Heritage Site.

== World Heritage Sites ==
UNESCO lists sites under ten criteria; each entry must meet at least one of the criteria. Criteria i through vi are cultural, and vii through x are natural.

World Heritage Sites
Site	Image	Location (island chain)	Year listed	UNESCO data	Description
Bikini Atoll Nuclear Test Site	A run-down stone structure surrounded by palm trees and grass.	Ralik Chain	2010	1339; iv, vi (cultural)	In the wake of World War II, in a move closely related to the beginnings of the Cold War, the United States of America decided to resume nuclear testing in the Pacific Ocean, on Bikini Atoll in the Marshall archipelago. After the displacement of the local inhabitants, 67 nuclear tests were carried out from 1946 to 1958, including the explosion of the first H-bomb (1952). Bikini Atoll has conserved direct tangible evidence that is highly significant in conveying the power of the nuclear tests, i.e. the sunken ships sent to the bottom of the lagoon by the tests in 1946 and the gigantic Bravo crater. Equivalent to 7,000 times the force of the Hiroshima bomb, the tests had major consequences on the geology and natural environment of Bikini Atoll and on the health of those who were exposed to radiation. Through its history, the atoll symbolises the dawn of the nuclear age, despite its paradoxical image of peace and of earthly paradise. This is the first site from the Marshall Islands to be inscribed on the World Heritage List.

== Tentative list ==
In addition to sites inscribed on the World Heritage List, member states can maintain a list of tentative sites that they may consider for nomination. Nominations for the World Heritage List are only accepted if the site was previously listed on the tentative list. As of 2025, the Marshall Islands have listed three properties on their tentative list.

Tentative sites
Site	Image	Location (island chain)	Year listed	UNESCO criteria	Description
Northern Marshall Islands Atolls	A satellite image of Ailinginae Atoll	Ralik Chain	2005	(mixed)	
Likiep Village Historic District	A yellow-and-white catholic church on Likiep Atoll	Ratak Chain	2005	ii, iv (cultural)	
Mili Atoll Nature Conservancy (and Nadrikdrik)	A satellite image of Mili Atoll	Ratak Chain	2005	(natural)	
