= List of World Heritage Sites in Seychelles =

Location of World Heritage Sites in Seychelles

The United Nations Educational, Scientific and Cultural Organization (UNESCO) World Heritage Sites are places of importance to cultural or natural heritage as described in the UNESCO World Heritage Convention, established in 1972. Cultural heritage consists of monuments (such as architectural works, monumental sculptures, or inscriptions), groups of buildings, and sites (including archaeological sites). Natural features (consisting of physical and biological formations), geological and physiographical formations (including habitats of threatened species of animals and plants), and natural sites which are important from the point of view of science, conservation or natural beauty, are defined as natural heritage. Seychelles accepted the convention on April 9, 1980, making its historical sites eligible for inclusion on the list. As of 2025, there are two World Heritage Sites in Seychelles.

== World Heritage Sites ==
UNESCO lists sites under ten criteria; each entry must meet at least one of the criteria. Criteria i through vi are cultural, and vii through x are natural.

World Heritage Sites
Site	Image	Location	Year listed	UNESCO data	Description
Aldabra Atoll	An island photographed from an airplane	Outer Islands	1982	185; vii, ix, x (natural)	The atoll consists of four large coral islands which enclose a shallow lagoon; the group of islands is itself surrounded by a coral reef. Due to difficulties of access and the atoll's isolation, Aldabra has been protected from human influence and thus retains some 152,000 giant tortoises, the world's largest population of this reptile.
Vallée de Mai Nature Reserve	Tropical forest vegetation	Praslin Island	1983	261; vii, viii, ix, x (natural)	In the heart of the small island of Praslin, the reserve has the vestiges of a natural palm forest preserved in almost its original state. The famous coco de mer, from a palm-tree once believed to grow in the depths of the sea, is the largest seed in the plant kingdom.

== Tentative List ==
In addition to sites inscribed on the World Heritage List, member states can maintain a list of tentative sites that they may consider for nomination. Nominations for the World Heritage List are only accepted if the site was previously listed on the tentative list. Seychelles maintainx two properties on its tentative list.

Tentative sites
Site	Image	Location	Year listed	UNESCO criteria	Description
Mission Ruins of Venn's Town		Mahé Island	2013	iv, vi (cultural)	
Silhouette Island		Silhouette Island	2013	v, x (mixed)	
