= List of World Heritage Sites in Liberia =

The United Nations Educational, Scientific and Cultural Organization (UNESCO) World Heritage Sites are places of importance to cultural or natural heritage as described in the UNESCO World Heritage Convention, established in 1972. Cultural heritage consists of monuments (such as architectural works, monumental sculptures, or inscriptions), groups of buildings, and sites (including archaeological sites). Natural features (consisting of physical and biological formations), geological and physiographical formations (including habitats of threatened species of animals and plants), and natural sites which are important from the point of view of science, conservation, or natural beauty, are defined as natural heritage. The Republic of Liberia accepted the convention on 28 March 2002. There are no World Heritage Sites in the country, but there are three on the tentative list. It has not served any terms on the Heritage Committee.

== Tentative list ==
UNESCO lists sites under ten criteria; each entry must meet at least one of the criteria. Criteria i through vi are cultural, and vii through x are natural. In addition to sites inscribed on the World Heritage List, member states can maintain a list of tentative sites that they may consider for nomination. Nominations for the World Heritage List are only accepted if the site was previously listed on the tentative list. In 2017, Liberia formally listed two of its tentative sites to the UNESCO World Heritage Centre, with an additional site following in 2023. It was the first time Liberia listed its sites to the organization for future inclusion. Three sites were listed throughout the country.

Tentative sites
Site	Image	Location (County)	Year listed	UNESCO criteria	Description
Mount Nimba Strict Reserve (extension)		Nimba County	2017	6246; ix, x (natural)	
Providence Island		Montserrado County	2017	6247; iv, vi (cultural)	
Gola Rainforest National Park		Grand Cape Mount County, Gbarpolu County	2017	6650; ix, x (natural)	

== See also ==
- List of World Heritage Sites in Africa
- Tourism in Africa
