= List of World Heritage Sites in Dominica =

Location of World Heritage Sites in Dominica

The United Nations Educational, Scientific and Cultural Organization (UNESCO) World Heritage Sites are places of importance to cultural or natural heritage as described in the UNESCO World Heritage Convention, established in 1972. Cultural heritage consists of monuments (such as architectural works, monumental sculptures, or inscriptions), groups of buildings, and sites (including archaeological sites). Natural features (consisting of physical and biological formations), geological and physiographical formations (including habitats of threatened species of animals and plants), and natural sites which are important from the point of view of science, conservation or natural beauty, are defined as natural heritage. Dominica accepted the convention on April 4, 1995, making its historical sites eligible for inclusion on the list. As of 2025, Dominica has only one World Heritage Site, Morne Trois Pitons National Park, which was inscribed in 1997.

== World Heritage Sites ==
UNESCO lists sites under ten criteria; each entry must meet at least one of the criteria. Criteria i through vi are cultural, and vii through x are natural.

World Heritage Sites
Site	Image	Location (parish)	Year listed	UNESCO data	Description
Morne Trois Pitons National Park	A waterfall in a forest	Saint David Parish, Saint George Parish, Saint Patrick Parish, Saint Paul Parish	1997	814; viii, ix (natural)	Luxuriant natural tropical forest blends with scenic volcanic features of great scientific interest in this national park centred on the 1,342-m-high volcano known as Morne Trois Pitons. With its precipitous slopes and deeply incised valleys, 50 fumaroles, hot springs, three freshwater lakes, a 'boiling lake' and five volcanoes, located on the park's nearly 7,000 ha, together with the richest biodiversity in the Lesser Antilles, Morne Trois Pitons National Park presents a rare combination of natural features of World Heritage value.

== Tentative list ==
In addition to sites inscribed on the World Heritage List, member states can maintain a list of tentative sites that they may consider for nomination. Nominations for the World Heritage List are only accepted if the site was previously listed on the tentative list. Dominica maintains three properties on its tentative list.

Tentative sites
Site	Image	Location (Parish)	Year listed	UNESCO criteria	Description
Fort Shirley	Cannons poited towards the sea	Saint John Parish	2015	ii, iv (cultural)	
Morne Diablotin National Park	A heavily forested island seen from the sea	Saint Andrew Parish, Saint John Parish, Saint Joseph Parish, Saint Peter Parish	2015	vii, x (natural)	
Soufriere-Scott's Head Marine Reserve	Two bodies of water interrupted by a small land bridge	Saint Mark Parish	2015	vii, ix (natural)	
