= List of World Heritage Sites in Nicaragua =

Location of World Heritage Sites in Nicaragua

The United Nations Educational, Scientific and Cultural Organization (UNESCO) World Heritage Sites are places of importance to cultural or natural heritage as described in the UNESCO World Heritage Convention, established in 1972. Cultural heritage consists of monuments (such as architectural works, monumental sculptures, or inscriptions), groups of buildings, and sites (including archaeological sites). Natural features (consisting of physical and biological formations), geological and physiographical formations (including habitats of threatened species of animals and plants), and natural sites which are important from the point of view of science, conservation or natural beauty, are defined as natural heritage. Nicaragua accepted the convention on December 17, 1979, making its historical sites eligible for inclusion on the list. As of 2024, Nicaragua has two World Heritage Sites, both located in León Department.

== World Heritage Sites ==
UNESCO lists sites under ten criteria; each entry must meet at least one of the criteria. Criteria i through vi are cultural, and vii through x are natural.

World Heritage Sites
Site	Image	Location (department)	Year listed	UNESCO data	Description
Ruins of León Viejo		León Department	2000	613rev; iii, iv (cultural)	León Viejo is one of the oldest Spanish colonial settlements in the Americas. It did not develop and so its ruins are outstanding testimony to the social and economic structures of the Spanish Empire in the 16th century. Moreover, the site has immense archaeological potential.
León Cathedral		León Department	2011	1236rev; ii, iv (cultural)	Built between 1747 and the early 19th century to the design of Guatemalan architect Diego José de Porres Esquivel, the monument expresses the transition from Baroque to Neoclassical architecture and its style can be considered to be eclectic. The cathedral is characterized by the sobriety of its interior decoration and the abundance of natural light. The vault of the Sanctuary, however, presents rich ornamentation. The Cathedral houses important works of art including a wooden Flemish altarpiece, and paintings of the 14 stations of the Way of the Cross by Nicaraguan artist Antonio Sarria (late 19th and early 20th centuries).

== Tentative list ==
In addition to sites inscribed on the World Heritage List, member states can maintain a list of tentative sites that they may consider for nomination. Nominations for the World Heritage List are only accepted if the site was previously listed on the tentative list. As of June 2025, Nicaragua has listed five properties on its tentative list.

Tentative sites
Site	Image	Location (department)	Year listed	UNESCO criteria	Description
Fortress of the Immaculate Conception		Río San Juan Department	1995	(mixed)	
The Natural Reserve "Miskitos Keys"		North Caribbean Coast Autonomous Region	1995	(natural)	
The Natural Reserve "Bosawás"		Jinotega Department, North Caribbean Coast Autonomous Region	1995	(natural)	
Volcan Masaya National Park		Managua Department, Masaya Department	1995	(natural)	
City of Granada and its natural environment		Granada Department	2003	(mixed)	
