= List of World Heritage Sites in Benin =

Location of World Heritage Sites in Benin. The blue dot is a natural site, while the two red dots are cultural.

The United Nations Educational, Scientific and Cultural Organization (UNESCO) World Heritage Sites are places of importance to cultural or natural heritage as described in the UNESCO World Heritage Convention, established in 1972. Cultural heritage consists of monuments (such as architectural works, monumental sculptures, or inscriptions), groups of buildings, and sites (including archaeological sites). Natural features (consisting of physical and biological formations), geological and physiographical formations (including habitats of threatened species of animals and plants), and natural sites, which are important from the point of view of science, conservation or natural beauty, are defined as natural heritage. Benin accepted the convention on June 14, 1982, making its sites eligible for inclusion on the list.

Benin has three World Heritage Sites and a further five sites on the tentative list. The first site, the Royal Palaces of Abomey, was added to the list in 1985 and immediately listed as endangered because of the damage to the property from a 1984 tornado. Following a restoration, the site was removed from the endangered list in 2007. The other two sites are transnational. The W National Park was originally listed independently in Niger in 1996. In 2017, the site was extended to include the Arli National Park in Burkina Faso and Pendjari National Park in Benin to form the W–Arly–Pendjari Complex. Koutammakou, the Land of the Batammariba, was initially listed independently in Togo and expanded in 2023 to include the sites across the border in Benin. The W–Arly–Pendjari Complex is listed for its natural significance while the other two are cultural sites. Benin has served on the World Heritage Committee twice.

== World Heritage Sites ==
UNESCO lists sites under ten criteria; each entry must meet at least one of the criteria. Criteria i through vi are cultural, and vii through x are natural.

* Transnational site

World Heritage Sites
Site	Image	Location (department)	Year listed	UNESCO data	Description
Royal Palaces of Abomey	Building with brown walls and a monument inside a large cob enclosure	Zou	1985	323bis; iii, iv (cultural)	The Kingdom of Dahomey existed between 1625 and 1900 and was a major regional power. The complex of palaces, the capital of the twelve kings, consists of two components, surrounded by cob walls. There are ten palaces that are decorated by polychrome bas-reliefs. The complex also includes ceremonial sites and storage facilities for the treasures of the kingdom. The palaces are no longer inhabited, but some buildings serve as a museum. Immediately after its inscription in 1985, the site was also listed as endangered because of the damage to the property in a 1984 tornado. Following a restoration, the site was removed from the endangered list in 2007.
W–Arly–Pendjari Complex*	The Pendjari River during the dry season, surrounded by vegetation	Atakora	2017	749ter; ix, x (natural)	This site comprises the W National Park, which was initially listed independently in Niger in 1996, and Arli National Park in Burkina Faso and Pendjari National Park (pictured) in Benin, which were added in 2017. The area covers large expanses of Sudano-Sahelian savanna with grasslands, wood savanna, shrublands, riparian forests, and gallery forests. The landscape has been shaped by human activity for tens of thousands of years, with fires being crucial for maintaining diverse vegetation. The parks are home to healthy populations of large mammals, including the African elephant, lion, cheetah, African wild dog, and topi antelope.
Koutammakou, the Land of the Batammariba*	A woman in front of a groups of mudbrick houses with thatched roofs	Atakora	2023	1140bis; v, vi (cultural)	The cultural landscape of Koutammakou, on the border between Togo and Benin, has been shaped by the Batammariba people, who have lived here since the 6th century. It is characterized by the mudbrick tower houses called takienta. The landscape has a prominent role in the beliefs and rituals of the local community. There are sacred sites, funerary sites, water retaining walls, and terraced hills. The site was initially independently listed in Togo in 2004; the area in Benin was added in 2023.

== Tentative list ==
In addition to sites inscribed on the World Heritage List, member states can maintain a "tentative list" of sites that they may consider for nomination. Nominations for the World Heritage List are only accepted if the site was previously listed on the tentative list. There are currently five properties listed on Benin's tentative list.

Tentative sites
Site	Image	Location (department)	Year listed	UNESCO criteria	Description
The city of Porto Novo: old quarters and Royal Palace	Inside of a building with brown walls	Ouémé	1996	v, vi (cultural)	No description provided in the nomination documentation. Porto Novo is the capital and the second largest city of Benin. Under the Portuguese, it was a major hub of the Atlantic slave trade. The kings of the Kingdom of Porto Novo lived in the Royal Palace, which today hosts a museum.
W Reserve of Niger and the vernacular habitat of northern Benin*	River surrounded by lush vegetation	Atakora	1996	iii, iv (cultural)	This is an old nomination that considered the W National Park in Niger and sites in Benin. The former was listed independently in 1996, while the Benin parts were added in 2017 together with a site in Burkina Faso to form the W–Arly–Pendjari Complex.
Agongointo-Zoungoudo Underground Town	Stairs leading to underground level	Zou	1998	i, iv (cultural)	This underground town consists of a series of bunkers with kitchens, living rooms, bedrooms, and wells, that were built to house the warriors. The rooms are located 10 m (33 ft) underground. They date to the 17th century and were built under the rule of King Dakodonou of Dahomey. They were discovered during the construction of a road bypass in 1998.
Lower Ouémé Valley	River entering the sea with a fishing boat and a large ship in the background	Atlantique	2020	v, ix (mixed)	The cultural landscape was shaped by the communities, who, in the 18th century, escaped tribal wars and slave raids and established villages, protected by the natural settings. Houses are often built on stilts. The landscape comprises various ecosystems, with river and marine habitats, marshes, lagoons, floating vegetation, savannas, and gallery forests. The area is home to numerous fish and bird species, eight species of primates, and the African manatee.
Highlights of the Slave Route in Benin	Granite hills partially covered by vegetation	Atlantique, Collines, Plateau, Zou	2021	iv, vi (cultural)	This nomination comprises sites related to the Atlantic slave trade between the 17th and 19th centuries under the Kingdom of Dahomey when Benin was part of the area known as the Slave Coast. The sites include the caravan stops, slave warehouses, slave markets, and the sites at the coast of Ouidah, where slaves were shipped to the Americas. The Sacred hills of Dassa, a place of refuge and resistance, are pictured.
