= List of World Heritage Sites in Jamaica =

Location of World Heritage Site in Jamaica

The United Nations Educational, Scientific and Cultural Organization (UNESCO) World Heritage Sites are places of importance to cultural or natural heritage as described in the UNESCO World Heritage Convention, established in 1972. Cultural heritage consists of monuments (such as architectural works, monumental sculptures, or inscriptions), groups of buildings, and sites (including archaeological sites). Natural features (consisting of physical and biological formations), geological and physiographical formations (including habitats of threatened species of animals and plants), and natural sites which are important from the point of view of science, conservation or natural beauty, are defined as natural heritage. Jamaica accepted the convention on January 18, 1980, making its historical sites eligible for inclusion on the list. Jamaica has two World Heritage Sites: Blue and John Crow Mountains (inscribed in 2015) and The Archaeological Ensemble of 17th Century Port Royal (inscribed in 2025). The country also has two sites on the tentative list.

== World Heritage Sites ==
UNESCO lists sites under ten criteria; each entry must meet at least one of the criteria. Criteria i through vi are cultural, and vii through x are natural.

World Heritage Sites
Site	Image	Location	Year listed	UNESCO data	Description
Blue and John Crow Mountains	A branch in front of a scenery with clouded forested hills	Portland Parish, Saint Andrew Parish, Saint Mary Parish, Saint Thomas Parish	2015	1356rev; iii, vi, x (mixed)	The site encompasses a rugged and extensively forested mountainous region in the south-east of Jamaica, which provided refuge first for the indigenous Tainos fleeing slavery and then for Maroons (former enslaved peoples). They resisted the European colonial system in this isolated region by establishing a network of trails, hiding places and settlements, which form the Nanny Town Heritage Route. The forests offered the Maroons everything they needed for their survival. They developed strong spiritual connections with the mountains, still manifest through the intangible cultural legacy of, for example, religious rites, traditional medicine and dances. The site is also a biodiversity hotspot for the Caribbean Islands with a high proportion of endemic plant species, especially lichens, mosses and certain flowering plants.
The Archaeological Ensemble of 17th Century Port Royal		Kingston Parish, Saint Andrew Parish	2025	1595; iv, vi (cultural)	

== Tentative List ==
Site	Image	Location	Criteria	Year of submission	Description
Seville Heritage Park		Saint Ann Parish	ii, iii, iv (cultural)	2009	
Cockpit Country Protected Area		Trelawny Parish	iii, vi, x (mixed)	2025	
