= List of World Heritage Sites in Chad =

Location of World Heritage Sites in Chad. The green dot represents a natural site and the blue dot represents a mixed site.

The United Nations Educational, Scientific and Cultural Organization (UNESCO) designates World Heritage Sites of outstanding universal value to cultural or natural heritage which have been nominated by countries which are signatories to the UNESCO World Heritage Convention, established in 1972. Cultural heritage consists of monuments (such as architectural works, monumental sculptures, or inscriptions), groups of buildings, and sites (including archaeological sites). Natural features (consisting of physical and biological formations), geological and physiographical formations (including habitats of threatened species of animals and plants), and natural sites which are important from the point of view of science, conservation or natural beauty, are defined as natural heritage. The Republic of Chad ratified the convention on 23 June 1999.

Chad has two sites on the World Heritage list. The first property listed in Chad were the Lakes of Ounianga, which are a natural site, in 2012. In 2016, Ennedi Massif: Natural and Cultural Landscape was listed as a mixed World Heritage Site.

== World Heritage Sites ==
UNESCO lists sites under ten criteria; each entryway must meet at least one of the criteria. Criteria i through vi are cultural, and vii through x are natural.

World Heritage Sites
Site	Image	Location (province)	Year listed	UNESCO data	Description
Lakes of Ounianga		Ennedi Region	2012	1400: vii (natural)	The site includes eighteen interconnected lakes in the hyper arid Ennedi region of the Sahara desert covering an area of 62,808 ha. It constitutes an exceptional natural landscape of great beauty with striking colours and shapes. The saline, hyper saline and freshwater lakes are supplied by groundwater and are found in two groups 40 km apart. Ounianga Kebir comprises four lakes, the largest of which, Yoan, covers an area of 358 ha and is 27 m deep. Its highly saline waters only sustain algae and some microorganisms. The second group, Ounianga Serir, comprises fourteen lakes separated by sand dunes. Floating reeds cover almost half the surface of these lakes reducing evaporation. At 436 ha, Lake Teli has the largest surface area but is less than 10 m deep. With their high quality freshwater, some of these lakes are home to aquatic fauna, particularly fish.
Ennedi Massif: Natural and Cultural Landscape		Ennedi Region	2016	1475; iii, vii, ix (mixed)	In the northeast of the country, the sandstone Ennedi Massif has been sculpted over time by water and wind erosion into a plateau featuring canyons and valleys that present a spectacular landscape marked by cliffs, natural arches and pitons. In the largest canyons, the permanent presence of water plays an essential role in the Massif's ecosystem, sustaining flora and fauna as well as human life. Thousands of images have been painted and carved into the rock surface of caves, canyons and shelters, presenting one of the largest ensembles of rock art in the Sahara.

== Tentative List ==
In addition to the sites inscribed on the World Heritage list, member states can maintain a list of tentative sites that they may consider for nomination. Nominations for the World Heritage list are only accepted if the site was previously listed on the tentative list. Chad lists seven properties on its tentative list.

* Transnational site

Tentative sites
Site	Image	Location (province)	Year listed	UNESCO criteria	Description
Begon II metallurgical site		Logone Occidental Region	2005	(cultural)	The Begon II metallurgical site is located in Southern Chad, approximately 150 km away from Moundou. The closest town, which is located 50 km from the site, is Béssao. The site, which is nearly 1,800 m^{2} in area, is 1.5 km
Hominid sites in Djourab		Borkou Region	2005	(natural)	
Ruins of Ouara		Ouaddai Region	2005	(cultural)	
The Curious Iron Mines of Télé-Nugar		Guera Region	2005	(cultural)	
Petroglyphs and rock paintings of Ennedi and Tibesti		Borkou Region, Ennedi Region, Tibesti Region	2005	(cultural)	
Zakouma National Park		Guéra Region, Salamat Region	2005	(natural)	
Lake Chad cultural landscape		Lac Region	2018	ii, iii, vii, ix (mixed)	
