= List of World Heritage Sites in Saint Kitts and Nevis =

Location of World Heritage Sites in Saint Kitts and Nevis

The United Nations Educational, Scientific and Cultural Organization (UNESCO) World Heritage Sites are places of importance to cultural or natural heritage as described in the UNESCO World Heritage Convention, established in 1972. Cultural heritage consists of monuments (such as architectural works, monumental sculptures, or inscriptions), groups of buildings, and sites (including archaeological sites). Natural features (consisting of physical and biological formations), geological and physiographical formations (including habitats of threatened species of animals and plants), and natural sites which are important from the point of view of science, conservation, or natural beauty, are defined as natural heritage. Saint Kitts and Nevis accepted the convention on July 10, 1986, making its historical sites eligible for inclusion on the list. As of 2023, Saint Kitts and Nevis has only one World Heritage Site, Brimstone Hill Fortress National Park, which was inscribed in 1999.

== World Heritage Sites ==
UNESCO lists sites under ten criteria; each entry must meet at least one of the criteria. Criteria i through vi are cultural, and vii through x are natural.

World Heritage Sites
Site	Image	Location (parish)	Year listed	UNESCO data	Description
Brimstone Hill Fortress National Park	A view of a fortress from above	Saint Thomas Middle Island	1999	910; iii, iv (cultural)	Brimstone Hill Fortress National Park is an outstanding, well-preserved example of 17th- and 18th-century military architecture in a Caribbean context. Designed by the British and built by African slave labour, the fortress is testimony to European colonial expansion, the African slave trade and the emergence of new societies in the Caribbean.

== Tentative List ==
In addition to sites inscribed on the World Heritage List, member states can maintain a list of tentative sites that they may consider for nomination. Nominations for the World Heritage List are only accepted if the site was previously listed on the tentative list. Saint Kitts and Nevis lists two properties on its tentative list.

Tentative sites
Site	Image	Location (parish)	Year listed	UNESCO criteria	Description
Historic zone of Basseterre		Saint George Basseterre Parish	1998	(cultural)	
City of Charlestown		Saint Paul Charlestown Parish	1998	(cultural)	
