= List of World Heritage Sites in Somalia =

The United Nations Educational, Scientific and Cultural Organization (UNESCO) World Heritage Sites are places of importance to cultural or natural heritage as described in the UNESCO World Heritage Convention, established in 1972. Cultural heritage consists of monuments (such as architectural works, monumental sculptures, or inscriptions), groups of buildings, and sites (including archaeological sites). Natural features (consisting of physical and biological formations), geological and physiographical formations (including habitats of threatened species of animals and plants), and natural sites which are important from the point of view of science, conservation, or natural beauty, are defined as natural heritage. Somalia accepted the convention on July 23, 2020, making its historical sites eligible for inclusion on the list. As of 2025, Somalia recorded three sites on its tentative list.

== Tentative list ==
UNESCO lists sites under ten criteria; each entry must meet at least one of the criteria. Criteria i through vi are cultural, and vii through x are natural. In addition to sites inscribed on the World Heritage List, member states can maintain a list of tentative sites that they may consider for nomination. Nominations for the World Heritage List are only accepted if the site was previously listed on the tentative list. Somalia maintains three properties on its tentative list.

Tentative sites
Site	Image	Location (gobol or federal member state)	Year listed	UNESCO criteria	Description
Bushbushle National Park		Lower Juba	2024	ix, x (natural)	
The Hobyo grass and Shrubland		Galmudug	2024	ix, x (natural)	
Mogadishu Secondo-Lido Lighthouse		Benadir	2025	i, ii, iii, iv (cultural)	
