= List of World Heritage Sites in Gabon =

Location of World Heritage Sites in Gabon. The green dot is a natural site, the blue dot is a mixed site

The United Nations Educational, Scientific and Cultural Organization (UNESCO) World Heritage Sites are places of importance to cultural or natural heritage as described in the UNESCO World Heritage Convention, established in 1972. Cultural heritage consists of monuments (such as architectural works, monumental sculptures, or inscriptions), groups of buildings, and sites (including archaeological sites). Natural features (consisting of physical and biological formations), geological and physiographical formations (including habitats of threatened species of animals and plants), and natural sites which are important from the point of view of science, conservation, or natural beauty, are defined as natural heritage. Gabon accepted the convention on 30 December 1986, making its historical sites eligible for inclusion on the list. As of 2023, there are two World Heritage Sites in Gabon.

There are two sites listed in Gabon. The first site, Ecosystem and Relict Cultural Landscape of Lopé-Okanda, was inscribed in 2007 as a mixed site. The next site was Ivindo National Park, inscribed as a natural site in 2021.

== World Heritage Sites ==
UNESCO lists sites under ten criteria; each entry must meet at least one of the criteria. Criteria i through vi are cultural, and vii through x are natural.

World Heritage Sites
| Site | Image | Location (province) | Year listed | UNESCO data | Description |
|---|---|---|---|---|---|
| Ecosystem and Relict Cultural Landscape of Lopé-Okanda | Hills and a river | Moyen-Ogooué Province, Ngounié Province, Ogooué-Ivindo Province, Ogooué-Lolo Province | 2007 | 1147rev; iii, iv, ix, x (mixed) | The Ecosystem and Relict Cultural Landscape of Lopé-Okanda demonstrates an unusual interface between dense and well-conserved tropical rainforest and relict savannah environments with a great diversity of species, including endangered large mammals, and habitats. The site illustrates ecological and biological processes in terms of species and habitat adaptation to post-glacial climatic changes. It contains evidence of the successive passages of different peoples who have left extensive and comparatively well-preserved remains of habitation around hilltops, caves and shelters, evidence of iron-working and a remarkable collection of some 1,800 petroglyphs (rock carvings). The property's collection of Neolithic and Iron Age sites, together with the rock art found there, reflects a major migration route of Bantu and other peoples from West Africa along the River Ogooué valley to the north of the dense evergreen Congo forests and to central east and southern Africa, that has shaped the development of the whole of sub-Saharan Africa. |
| Ivindo National Park | A stream with a small waterfall in a tropical forest | Ogooué-Ivindo Province, Ogooué-Lolo Province | 2021 | 1653; ix, x (natural) | Situated on the equator in northern Gabon the largely pristine site encompasses an area of almost 300,000 ha crossed by a network of picturesque blackwater rivers. It features rapids and waterfalls bordered by intact rainforest, which make for a landscape of great aesthetic value. The site's aquatic habitats harbour endemic freshwater fish species, 13 of which are threatened, and at least seven species of Podostemaceae riverweeds, with probable micro-endemic aquatic flora at each waterfall. Many fish species in the property are yet to be described and parts of the site have hardly been investigated. Critically Endangered Slender-snouted Crocodiles (Mecistops cataphractus) find shelter in Ivindo National Park which also boasts biogeographically unique Caesalpinioideae old-growth forests of high conservation value, supporting, for instance, a very high diversity of butterflies alongside threatened flagship mammals and avian fauna such as the Critically Endangered Forest Elephant (Loxodonta cyclotis), Western Lowland Gorilla (Gorilla gorilla), the Endangered Chimpanzee (Pan troglodytes) and Grey Parrot (Psittacus erithacus) as well as the Vulnerable Grey-necked Rockfowl (Picathartes oreas), Mandrill (Mandrillus sphinx), Leopard (Panthera pardus), and African Golden Cat (Caracal aurata), and three species of Pangolin (Manidae spp.). |

== Tentative list ==
In addition to sites inscribed on the World Heritage List, member states can maintain a list of tentative sites that they may consider for nomination. Nominations for the World Heritage List are only accepted if the site was previously listed on the tentative list. Gabon maintains six properties on its tentative list.

Tentative sites
| Site | Image | Location (province) | Year listed | UNESCO criteria | Description |
|---|---|---|---|---|---|
| Moukalaba-Doudou National Park | | Ogooué-Maritime Province | 2022 | vii, ix (natural) | |
| Lastoursville caves | | Ogooué-Lolo Province | 2022 | iii, vi, vii, viii (mixed) | |
| Moulendé fossil site and the Bangombé nuclear pile | | Haut Ogooue Province | 2022 | Natural (vii) | |
| Birougou Mountains National Park | | Ngounié Province, Ogooué-Lolo Province | 2022 | ix, x (natural) | |
| Batéké Plateau National Park | | Haut-Ogooué Province | 2022 | v, vii, viii (mixed) | |
| Loango National Park | Two elephants grazing at Loango National Park. | Ogooué-Maritime Province | 2022 | vii, x (natural) | |
