= List of World Heritage Sites in Honduras =

Location of World Heritage Sites in Honduras. The red dot represents a cultural site and the green dot represents a natural site

The United Nations Educational, Scientific and Cultural Organization (UNESCO) World Heritage Sites are places of importance to cultural or natural heritage as described in the UNESCO World Heritage Convention, established in 1972. Cultural heritage consists of monuments (such as architectural works, monumental sculptures, or inscriptions), groups of buildings, and sites (including archaeological sites). Natural features (consisting of physical and biological formations), geological and physiographical formations (including habitats of threatened species of animals and plants), and natural sites which are important from the point of view of science, conservation or natural beauty, are defined as natural heritage. Honduras accepted the convention on June 8, 1979, making its historical sites eligible for inclusion on the list. As of 2024, Honduras has two World Heritage Site

== World Heritage Sites ==
UNESCO lists sites under ten criteria; each entry must meet at least one of the criteria. Criteria i through vi are cultural, and vii through x are natural.

† In danger

World Heritage Sites
Site	Image	Location (department)	Year listed	UNESCO data	Description
Maya Site of Copán		Copán Department	1980	129bis; iv, vi (cultural)	Copán, in ruins when it was discovered in 1570 by Diego García de Palacio Diego García de Palacio, was an extremely important site of Mayan civilization because it served as the political, civil and religious centre of the Copan Valley. Moreover, it also served as a political and cultural centre for the southeast of the Maya territory. The area was first populated in 1500 B.C., but the first traces of Maya people there date back to 100 A.D. This was after the first Maya immigration from the Guatemalan Highlands. Copán was transformed by a dynasty that Yax Kuk Mo started after his immigration from Tikal in 427. Copán became one of the greatest Mayan cities, paralleling other Mayan cities during the Classic Maya Period. Developments in hieroglyphic writing, astronomy, and mathematics occurred. The city was abandoned in the early 10th century. The excavation of the site in the 19th century revealed a ruined citadel and public squares. Today, the city consists of an Acropolis and other important ruins which are surrounded by secondary ruins.
Río Plátano Biosphere Reserve†		Gracias a Dios Department	1982	196; vii, viii, ix, x (natural)	

== Tentative List ==
In addition to sites inscribed on the World Heritage List, member states can maintain a list of tentative sites that they may consider for nomination. Nominations for the World Heritage List are only accepted if the site was previously listed on the tentative list. As of June 2025, Honduras has listed four properties on its tentative list.

Tentative sites
Site	Image	Location (department)	Year listed	UNESCO criteria	Description
Río Plátano Biosphere Reserve (natural extension)		Colón Department, Gracias a Dios Department, Olancho Department	2019	vii, ix, x (natural)	
San Fernando de Omoa Fortress		Cortés Department	2021	iv (cultural)	
El Gigante Rockshelter		La Paz Department	2021	iii, iv, v (cultural)	
Mining Towns of Central and Southern Honduras: Santa Lucía, Cedros, Ojojona-Guazucarán, San Antonio de Oriente, Tegucigalpa, Yuscarán, El Corpus		Choluteca Department, El Paraíso Department, Francisco Morazán Department	2021	iv (cultural)	
