= List of World Heritage Sites in Guinea =

Location of World Heritage Sites in Guinea

The United Nations Educational, Scientific and Cultural Organization (UNESCO) World Heritage Sites are places of importance to cultural or natural heritage as described in the UNESCO World Heritage Convention, established in 1972. Cultural heritage consists of monuments (such as architectural works, monumental sculptures, or inscriptions), groups of buildings, and sites (including archaeological sites). Natural features (consisting of physical and biological formations), geological and physiographical formations (including habitats of threatened species of animals and plants), and natural sites which are important from the point of view of science, conservation or natural beauty, are defined as natural heritage. The Republic of Guinea ratified the convention on March 18, 1979. It has one World Heritage Site and a further eight on the tentative list. Guinea has served on the World Heritage Committee once, from 1980 to 1987.

As of 2025, Guinea has only one World Heritage Site, Mount Nimba Strict Nature Reserve. It is shared with the neighbouring country of Ivory Coast. The site has been endangered since 1992.

== World Heritage Site ==
UNESCO lists sites under ten criteria; each entry must meet at least one of the criteria. Criteria i through vi are cultural, and vii through x are natural.

† In danger, transnational site

World Heritage Sites
Site	Image	Location (region)	Year listed	UNESCO data	Description
Mount Nimba Strict Nature Reserve†	The forest and mountains at Mount Nimba	Nzérékoré Region	1981	155bis; ix, x (natural)	This site was expanded in 1982 to include territories from Ivory Coast.

== Tentative list ==
In addition to sites inscribed on the World Heritage List, member states can maintain a list of tentative sites that they may consider for nomination. Nominations for the World Heritage List are only accepted if the site was previously listed on the tentative list. As of 2025, Guinea has listed nine properties on its tentative list.

World Heritage Sites
Site	Image	Location (region)	Year listed	UNESCO data	Description
The vernacular architecture and mandinga cultural landscape of Gberedou/Hamana		Kankan Region	2001	ii, v, vi (cultural)	
Mount Nimba Cultural Landscape	A view of the grain, mountains and trees at Mount Nimba	Nzérékoré Region	2001	ii, vi (cultural)	
Slave route in Africa, segment of Timbo, Pongo River		Mamou Region	2001	iv, vi (cultural)	
The coronation hut of the Almamy of Fouta Djallon		Mamou Region	2025	iii, v, vi (cultural)	
Badiar National Park (PNB)	Hippos at Badiar National Park going into a body of water	Boké Region	2025	x (natural)	
Niani, medieval city, ancient capital of the Mali Empire		Kankan Region	2025	iii, v, vi (cultural)	
Cultural Landscape of Bassari		Boké Region	2025	iii, v, vi (cultural)	
Fouta Djallon Massif	A wooden fence and some huts in front of a waterfall	Boké Region, Labé Region, Mamou Region	2025	vi, vii, x (mixed)	
