= List of World Heritage Sites in Andorra =

The United Nations Educational, Scientific and Cultural Organization (UNESCO) World Heritage Sites are places of importance to cultural or natural heritage as described in the UNESCO World Heritage Convention, established in 1972. Cultural heritage consists of monuments (such as architectural works, monumental sculptures, or inscriptions), groups of buildings, and sites (including archaeological sites). Natural features (consisting of physical and biological formations), geological and physiographical formations (including habitats of threatened species of animals and plants), and natural sites which are important from the point of view of science, conservation or natural beauty, are defined as natural heritage. As of 2026, Andorra has only one World Heritage Site.

== World Heritage Sites ==
UNESCO lists sites under ten criteria; each entry must meet at least one of the criteria. Criteria i through vi are cultural, and vii through x are natural.

* Transnational site

World Heritage Sites
Site	Image	Location	Year listed	UNESCO data	Description
Madriu-Perafita-Claror Valley	A small stone hut in the mountains.	Encamp, Andorra la Vella, Sant Julià de Lòria, Escaldes-Engordany, Andorra; 42°29′41″N 1°35′44″E	2004 (Note: Minor extension of the buffer zone in 2006.)	Cultural: (v)	

== Tentative list ==
In addition to sites inscribed on the World Heritage List, member states can maintain a list of tentative sites that they may consider for nomination. Nominations for the World Heritage List are only accepted if the site was previously listed on the tentative list. Andorra has one property on its tentative list.

World Heritage Sites
Site	Image	Location	Year listed	UNESCO data	Description
The Material Testimonies of the Construction of the Pyrenean State: The Co-principality of Andorra			2021	It includes 10 monuments in Andorra.	
