= List of World Heritage Sites in Zambia =

Location of World Heritage Sites in Zambia

The United Nations Educational, Scientific and Cultural Organization (UNESCO) World Heritage Sites are places of importance to cultural or natural heritage as described in the UNESCO World Heritage Convention, established in 1972. Cultural heritage consists of monuments (such as architectural works, monumental sculptures, or inscriptions), groups of buildings, and sites (including archaeological sites). Natural features (consisting of physical and biological formations), geological and physiographical formations (including habitats of threatened species of animals and plants), and natural sites which are important from the point of view of science, conservation or natural beauty, are defined as natural heritage. Zambia accepted the convention on June 4, 1984, making its historical sites eligible for inclusion on the list. As of 2025, there is only one World Heritage Site in Zambia, Mosi-oa-Tunya / Victoria Falls, which is shared with Zimbabwe. Zambia has served on the World Heritage Committee once, from 2021 to 2025.

== World Heritage Sites ==
UNESCO lists sites under ten criteria; each entry must meet at least one of the criteria. Criteria i through vi are cultural, and vii through x are natural.

* Transnational site

World Heritage Sites
Site	Image	Location (province)	Year listed	UNESCO data	Description
Mosi-oa-Tunya / Victoria Falls	A large waterfall flowing, with trees obscuring the view on the bottom corner of the image.	Southern Province	1989	509; vii, viii (natural)	

== Tentative List ==
In addition to sites inscribed on the World Heritage List, member states can maintain a list of tentative sites that they may consider for nomination. Nominations for the World Heritage List are only accepted if the site was previously listed on the tentative list. Zambia maintains 7 properties on its tentative list.

Tentative sites
Site	Image	Location (province)	Year listed	UNESCO criteria	Description
Dag Hammarskjoeld Memorial (Crash site)		Copperbelt Province	1997	i, ii (cultural)	
Kalambo falls archaeological site (prehistoric settlement site)		Northern Province	1997	i, ii (cultural)	
Chirundu Fossil Forest		Southern Province	2009	vii, viii (natural)	
Mwela Rock Paintings		Northern Province	2009	iii, v, vi (cultural)	
Kalambo Falls		Northern Province	2009	iii, iv, vii, viii (mixed)	
Zambezi Source		North-Western Province	2009	x (natural)	
The Barotse Cultural Landscape		Western Province	2009	iii, v (cultural)	
