= List of World Heritage Sites in Lesotho =

Location of World Heritage Sites in Lesotho

The United Nations Educational, Scientific and Cultural Organization (UNESCO) World Heritage Sites are places of importance to cultural or natural heritage as described in the UNESCO World Heritage Convention, established in 1972. Cultural heritage consists of monuments (such as architectural works, monumental sculptures, or inscriptions), groups of buildings, and sites (including archaeological sites). Natural features (consisting of physical and biological formations), geological and physiographical formations (including habitats of threatened species of animals and plants), and natural sites which are important from the point of view of science, conservation or natural beauty, are defined as natural heritage. Lesotho accepted the convention on November 25, 2003, making its historical sites eligible for inclusion on the list. As of 2025, Lesotho has only one World Heritage Site, Maloti-Drakensberg Park, which it shares with South Africa.

== World Heritage Sites ==
UNESCO lists sites under ten criteria; each entry must meet at least one of the criteria. Criteria i through vi are cultural, and vii through x are natural.

* Transnational site

World Heritage Sites
Site	Image	Location (district)	Year listed	UNESCO data	Description
Maloti-Drakensberg Park		Qacha's Nek District	985ter; i, iii, vii, x (mixed)	2000	The Maloti-Drakensberg Park is a transnational property composed of the uKhahlamba Drakensberg National Park in South Africa and the Sehlathebe National Park in Lesotho. The site has exceptional natural beauty in its soaring basaltic buttresses, incisive dramatic cutbacks, and golden sandstone ramparts as well as visually spectacular sculptured arches, caves, cliffs, pillars and rock pools. The site's diversity of habitats protects a high level of endemic and globally important plants. The site harbors endangered species such as the Cape vulture (Gyps coprotheres) and the bearded vulture (Gypaetus barbatus). Lesotho’s Sehlabathebe National Park also harbors the Maloti minnow (Pseudobarbus quathlambae), a critically endangered fish species only found in this park. This spectacular natural site contains many caves and rock-shelters with the largest and most concentrated group of paintings in Africa south of the Sahara. They represent the spiritual life of the San people, who lived in this area over a period of 4,000 years.

== Tentative list ==
In addition to sites inscribed on the World Heritage List, member states can maintain a list of tentative sites that they may consider for nomination. Nominations for the World Heritage List are only accepted if the site was previously listed on the tentative list. Lesotho maintains one property on its tentative list.

Tentative sites
Site	Image	Location (district)	Year listed	UNESCO criteria	Description
Botho, Diplomacy and Peace - Basotho Nation-building Cluster of Sites		Botha-Bothe, Berea, Leribe Maseru districts	2025	iv, v (cultural)	Covers the Menkhoaneng Heritage Site, Botha-Bothe Plateau, Pitseng Cave, Malimong Cave, and Thaba Bosiu National Monument (pictured).
