= List of World Heritage Sites in Gambia =

Location of World Heritage Sites in Gambia

The United Nations Educational, Scientific and Cultural Organization (UNESCO) designates World Heritage Sites of outstanding universal value to cultural or natural heritage which have been nominated by countries which are signatories to the UNESCO World Heritage Convention, established in 1972. Cultural heritage consists of monuments (such as architectural works, monumental sculptures, or inscriptions), groups of buildings, and sites (including archaeological sites). Natural features (consisting of physical and biological formations), geological and physiographical formations (including habitats of threatened species of animals and plants), and natural sites which are important from the point of view of science, conservation or natural beauty, are defined as natural heritage. Gambia accepted the convention on July 1, 1987, making its historical sites eligible for inclusion on the list. As of 2023, there are two World Heritage Sites in Gambia. The first World Heritage Site, Kunta Kinteh Island and Related Sites, was inscribed in 2003. The Stone Circles of Senegambia, which were inscribed in 2006, are shared with Senegal.

== World Heritage Sites ==
UNESCO lists sites under ten criteria; each entry must meet at least one of the criteria. Criteria i through vi are cultural, and vii through x are natural.

* Transnational site

World Heritage Sites
Site	Image	Location (division)	Year listed	UNESCO data	Description
Kunta Kinteh Island and Related Sites	A picture of Kunta Kinteh Island on the Gambia River	North Bank Division	2003	761rev; iii, vi (cultural)	James Island and Related Sites present a testimony to the main periods and facets of the encounter between Africa and Europe along the River Gambia, a continuum stretching from pre-colonial and pre-slavery times to independence. The site is particularly significant for its relation to the beginning of the slave trade and its abolition. It also documents early access to the interior of Africa.
Stone Circles of Senegambia*	A picture of Wassu stone circles	Central River Division	2006	1226; i, iii (cultural)	The site consists of four large groups of stone circles that represent an extraordinary concentration of over 1,000 monuments in a band 100 km wide along some 350 km of the River Gambia. The four groups, Sine Ngayène, Wanar, Wassu and Kerbatch, cover 93 stone circles and numerous tumuli, burial mounds, some of which have been excavated to reveal material that suggest dates between 3rd century BC and 16th century AD. Together the stone circles of laterite pillars and their associated burial mounds present a vast sacred landscape created over more than 1,500 years. It reflects a prosperous, highly organized and lasting society.

== Tentative list ==
In addition to sites inscribed on the World Heritage List, member states can maintain a list of tentative sites that they may consider for nomination. Nominations for the World Heritage List are only accepted if the site was previously listed on the tentative list. As of 2025, Senegal has listed two properties on its tentative list.

Tentative sites
Site	Image	Location (division)	Year listed	UNESCO criteria	Description
Wassu Stone Circles Quarry Site	A circle of stones of unknown origin	Central River Division	2015	i, iii (cultural)	
Historic Georgetown	A slave camp in Janjanbureh, Gambia	Central River Division	2015	iii, vi (cultural)	
