= List of World Heritage Sites in Sierra Leone =

Location of World Heritage Sites in Sierra Leone

The United Nations Educational, Scientific and Cultural Organization (UNESCO) World Heritage Sites are places of importance to cultural or natural heritage as described in the UNESCO World Heritage Convention, established in 1972. Cultural heritage consists of monuments (such as architectural works, monumental sculptures, or inscriptions), groups of buildings, and sites (including archaeological sites). Natural features (consisting of physical and biological formations), geological and physiographical formations (including habitats of threatened species of animals and plants), and natural sites which are important from the point of view of science, conservation or natural beauty, are defined as natural heritage. Sierra Leone accepted the convention on January 7, 2005, making its historical sites eligible for inclusion on the list. Sierra Leone has one World Heritage Sites and a further four sites on the tentative list. The first site, the Gola-Tiwai Complex, was added to the list in 2025.

== World Heritage Sites ==
UNESCO lists sites under ten criteria; each entry must meet at least one of the criteria. Criteria i through vi are cultural, and vii through x are natural.

World Heritage Sites
Site	Image	Location (province)	Year listed	UNESCO data	Description
Gola-Tiwai Complex	An image of the Tiwai Island River. It is mostly water with a forest to the right.	Eastern Province	2025	1746; ix, x (natural)	

== Tentative List ==
In addition to sites inscribed on the World Heritage List, member states can maintain a list of tentative sites that they may consider for nomination. Nominations for the World Heritage List are only accepted if the site was previously listed on the tentative list. Sierra Leone maintains four properties on its tentative list.

Tentative sites
Site	Image	Location (province)	Year listed	UNESCO criteria	Description
Western Area Peninsula National Park		Western Area	2012	iii, vii, ix (mixed)	
Old Fourah Bay College Building	A picture of the old building of the Fourah Bay College, it is a four-storey, mostly brick building.	Western Area	2012	iii, (cultural)	
Bunce Island	A satellite picture of Freetown in 2006	North West Province	2012	ii, iii, (cultural)	
The Gateway to the Old King's Yards		Western Area	2012	iii, (cultural)	
