= List of World Heritage Sites in Palau =

Location of World Heritage Sites in Palau

The United Nations Educational, Scientific and Cultural Organization (UNESCO) designates World Heritage Sites of outstanding universal value to cultural or natural heritage which have been nominated by countries which are signatories to the UNESCO World Heritage Convention, established in 1972. Cultural heritage consists of monuments (such as architectural works, monumental sculptures, or inscriptions), groups of buildings, and sites (including archaeological sites). Natural features (consisting of physical and biological formations), geological and physiographical formations (including habitats of threatened species of animals and plants), and natural sites which are important from the point of view of science, conservation or natural beauty, are defined as natural heritage. Palau accepted the convention on June 11, 2002, making its historical sites eligible for inclusion on the list. As of 2023, Palau has only one World Heritage Site.

== World Heritage Sites ==
UNESCO lists sites under ten criteria; each entry must meet at least one of the criteria. Criteria i through vi are cultural, and vii through x are natural.

† In danger

World Heritage Sites
Site	Image	Location (state)	Year listed	UNESCO data	Description
Rock Islands Southern Lagoon	An aerial view of the Rock Islands showcasing the vibrant blue color of the waters.	Koror	2012	1386; iii, v, vii, ix, x (mixed)	Rock Islands Southern Lagoon covers 100,200 ha and includes 445 uninhabited limestone islands of volcanic origin. Many of them display unique mushroom-like shapes in turquoise lagoons surrounded by coral reefs. The aesthetic beauty of the site is heightened by a complex reef system featuring over 385 coral species and different types of habitat. They sustain a large diversity of plants, birds and marine life including dugong and at least thirteen shark species. The site harbours the highest concentration of marine lakes anywhere, isolated bodies of seawater separated from the ocean by land barriers. They are among the islands’ distinctive features and sustain high endemism of populations which continue to yield new species discoveries. The remains of stonework villages, as well as burial sites and rock art, bear testimony to the organization of small island communities over some three millennia. The abandonment of the villages in the 17th and 18th centuries illustrates the consequences of climate change, population growth and subsistence behaviour on a society living in a marginal marine environment.

== Tentative list ==
In addition to sites inscribed on the World Heritage List, member states can maintain a list of tentative sites that they may consider for nomination. Nominations for the World Heritage List are only accepted if the site was previously listed on the tentative list. As of 2025, Palau has listed four properties on its tentative list.

Tentative sites
Site	Image	Location (state)	Year listed	UNESCO criteria	Description
Ouballang ra Ngebedech (Ngebedech Terraces)	The Ngebedech Terraces surrounded by forest.	Ngiwal	2004	ii, iii, v (cultural)	
Imeong Conservation Area		Koror	2004	(mixed)	
Yapease Quarry Sites	A rai stone the National Museum of Natural History which is located in the United States.	Airai	2004	i, ii, iii (cultural)	
Tet el Bad Stone Coffin	A stone coffin located in the forest of Tel el Bad.	Ngarchelong	2004	i (cultural)	
