= List of World Heritage Sites in Angola =

Location of World Heritage Sites in Angola

The United Nations Educational, Scientific and Cultural Organization (UNESCO) designates World Heritage Sites of outstanding universal value to cultural or natural heritage which have been nominated by countries which are signatories to the UNESCO World Heritage Convention, established in 1972. Cultural heritage consists of monuments (such as architectural works, monumental sculptures, or inscriptions), groups of buildings, and sites (including archaeological sites). Natural features (consisting of physical and biological formations), geological and physiographical formations (including habitats of threatened species of animals and plants), and natural sites which are important from the point of view of science, conservation or natural beauty, are defined as natural heritage. Angola accepted the convention on November 7, 1991, making its historical sites eligible for inclusion on the list. As of 2023, Angola has only one World Heritage Site.

== World Heritage Sites ==
UNESCO lists sites under ten criteria; each entry must meet at least one of the criteria. Criteria i through vi are cultural, and vii through x are natural.

* Transnational site

World Heritage Sites
Site	Image	Location (province)	Year listed	UNESCO data	Description
Mbanza Kongo, Vestiges of the Capital of the former Kingdom of Kongo		Zaire Province	2017	1511; iii, iv (cultural)	The town of Mbanza Kongo, located on a plateau at an altitude of 570 m, was the political and spiritual capital of the Kingdom of Kongo, one of the largest constituted states in Southern Africa from the 14th to 19th centuries. The historical area grew around the royal residence, the customary court and the holy tree, as well as the royal funeral places. When the Portuguese arrived in the 15th century they added stone buildings constructed in accordance with European methods to the existing urban conurbation built in local materials. Mbanza Kongo illustrates, more than anywhere in sub-Saharan Africa, the profound changes caused by the introduction of Christianity and the arrival of the Portuguese into Central Africa.

== Tentative List ==
In addition to sites inscribed on the World Heritage List, member states can maintain a list of tentative sites that they may consider for nomination. Nominations for the World Heritage List are only accepted if the site was previously listed on the tentative list. As of 2025, Angola lists four properties on its tentative list.

Tentative sites
Site	Image	Location (governorate)	Year listed	UNESCO criteria	Description
Kwanza Corridor-Cultural Landscape		Bengo Province, Cuanza Norte Province, Malanje Province	2017	iii, v, vi, vii (mixed)	
Archaeological site of Tchitundu-Hulu		Namibe Province	2017	iii, v (cultural	
Cuito Canavale, site of liberation and independence		Cuando Cubango Province	2017	iii, vi (cultural)	
Okavango Delta (Cubango-Okavango-Cuando-Zambezi catchments)*			2025	vii, ix, x (natural)	This site covers protected areas (including Luengue-Luiana and Mavinga national parks) around rivers that feed into the Okavango Delta, one of the largest inland delta systems in the world. It is a proposed extension of the already inscribed Botswanan portion of the Okavango Delta, put forward together with the corresponding Namibian extension.
