= List of World Heritage Sites in Ghana =

Location of World Heritage Sites in Ghana

The United Nations Educational, Scientific and Cultural Organization (UNESCO) World Heritage Sites are places of importance to cultural or natural heritage nominated by signatory countries to the World Heritage Convention of 1972. Cultural heritage comprises monuments (such as architectural works, monumental sculptures, or inscriptions), groups of buildings, and sites (including archaeological ones). Natural heritage comprises natural features (such as physical and biological formations), geological and physiographical formations (including habitats of threatened flora and fauna), and natural sites which are important for scientific research, conservation or natural aesthetic. Ghana accepted the convention on July 4, 1975, making its historical sites eligible for inclusion on the list. As of 2023, Ghana has two World Heritage Sites. It has served on the World Heritage Committee once, from 1976 to 1980.

Ghana's first World Heritage Site, the Forts and Castles, Volta, Greater Accra, Central and Western Regions, was inscribed in 1979 for its cultural significance. Its second, and most recent, inscription occurred the following year for another cultural site: the Asante Traditional Buildings.

== World Heritage Sites ==
UNESCO lists sites under ten criteria; each entry must meet at least one of the criteria. Criteria i through vi are cultural, and vii through x are natural.

World Heritage Sites
Site	Image	Location (Region)	Year listed	UNESCO data	Description
Forts and Castles, Volta, Greater Accra, Central and Western Regions		Central Region, Greater Accra Region, Volta Region, Western Region	34; iv (cultural)	1979	The remains of fortified trading-posts, erected between 1482 and 1786, can still be seen along the coast of Ghana between Keta and Beyin. They were links in the trade routes established by the Portuguese in many areas of the world during their era of great maritime exploration.
Asante Traditional Buildings		Ashanti Region	35; v (cultural)	1980	To the north-east of Kumasi, these are the last material remains of the great Asante civilization, which reached its high point in the 18th century. Since the dwellings are made of earth, wood and straw, they are vulnerable to the onslaught of time and weather.

== Tentative list ==
In addition to sites inscribed on the World Heritage List, member states can maintain a list of tentative sites for nomination consideration. Nominations for the list are only accepted if the site had been on the tentative list.

World Heritage Sites
Site	Image	Location (Region)	Year listed	UNESCO criteria	Description
Mole National Park		Savannah Region	2000	vii, viii, ix, x (natural)	
Tenzug - Tallensi settlements		Upper East Region	2000	i, ii, v, vi (cultural)	
Navrongo Catholic Cathedral		Upper East Region	2000	(cultural)	
Trade Pilgrimage Routes of North-Western Ghana		Ahafo Region, Bono Region, Bono East Region, North East, Northern Region Savannah Region, Upper East Region	2000	i, ii, iii, iv (cultural)	
Kakum National Park (Assin Attandanso Reserve)		Central Region	2000	vii, x (natural)	
