= List of World Heritage Sites in Iceland =

World Heritage Sites in Iceland

The United Nations Educational, Scientific and Cultural Organization (UNESCO) World Heritage Sites are places of importance to cultural or natural heritage as described in the UNESCO World Heritage Convention, established in 1972. Iceland accepted the convention on 19 December 1995, making its natural and cultural sites eligible for inclusion on the list.

As of 2020, Iceland has three sites inscribed on the list. The first site added to the list was the Þingvellir National Park, in 2004. Two further sites were added later, Surtsey in 2008 and Vatnajökull National Park in 2019. Þingvellir is a cultural site while the other two are natural sites.

In addition to its World Heritage Sites, Iceland also maintains six properties on its tentative list. The existing site of Þingvellir is listed on the tentative list twice, as a proposal to extend the cultural site to include the natural heritage, and as a part of a new transnational nomination to cover the Viking heritage.

== World Heritage Sites ==
UNESCO lists sites under ten criteria; each entry must meet at least one of the criteria. Criteria i through vi are cultural, and vii through x are natural.

Site	Image	Location	Year listed	UNESCO data	Description
Þingvellir National Park	Rock formation and a flag of Iceland on a pole	Bláskógabyggð	2004	1152; iii, vi (cultural)	Þingvellir is located in an active volcanic area, prominently featuring a major tectonic rift. From around 930 AD to 1798, Þingvellir served as a venue for the Althing, an open-air assembly representing the whole of Iceland, where people gathered for two weeks each year to set laws and settle disputes. The Althing is the oldest surviving parliament in the world. Fragments of around 50 booths built from turf and stone are visible, although the remains from the 10th century are buried underground.
Surtsey	A view of the island from afar	Vestmannaeyjar	2008	1267; ix (natural)	Surtsey is a volcanic island that formed in a series of eruptions from 1963 to 1967, around 32 kilometres (20 mi) off the south coast of Iceland. Since 1964, it has served as a site to study colonisation from founder populations that arrived from outside. As only a few scientists are allowed to visit, it has remained practically undisturbed since its formation.
Vatnajökull National Park – Dynamic Nature of Fire and Ice	Glacier covering the mountains	South-eastern Iceland	2019	1604; viii (natural)	The Vatnajökull ice cap is Europe's second largest glacier and covers several volcanoes, including two of the most active ones on the island. The interactions between volcanoes and the glacier give rise to various phenomena, including the spectacular jökulhlaup – a sudden outburst flood caused by the breach of the margin of a glacier during a subglacial eruption.

== Tentative list ==
In addition to sites inscribed on the World Heritage List, member states can maintain a list of tentative sites that they may consider for nomination. Nominations for the World Heritage List are only accepted if the site was previously listed on the tentative list. As of 2019, Iceland has six on its tentative list.

* Transnational site

Site	Image	Location	Year listed	UNESCO criteria	Description
Breiðafjörður Nature Reserve	A view of the bay. Road and a radio tower in front.	West Iceland	2011	ii, v, x (mixed)	Breiðafjörður is a large shallow bay in Western Iceland. Dotted with islands, islets, and skerries; it is an important breeding ground for birds, including brent goose (Branta benicla) and red knot (Calidris canutus). The area has been continuously populated since the settlement of Iceland, and preserves communities based on the sustainable use of the local environment.
Mývatn and Laxá	Mývatn lake, surrounded by lush vegetation	North Iceland	2011	viii, ix, x (natural)	The shores of Lake Mývatn and the River Laxá are lush with vegetation, in stark contrast to the surrounding barren volcanic landscape. The shallow lake, rich with nutrients, is home to swarms of aquatic insects which are in turn food for several species of aquatic birds. Fifteen species of ducks breed in the area regularly.
Viking monuments and sites / Þingvellir National Park*	Þingvellir, the tectonic crack	Bláskógarbyggð	2011	iii (cultural)	This is a part of a serial nomination of nine sites from six countries representing the outstanding examples of heritage from the Viking Age, where Þingvellir and some other sites are already listed individually.
Þingvellir National Park	Þingvellir lake shore	Bláskógarbyggð	2011	vii, viii, ix, x (natural)	This nomination focuses on the natural heritage of the already listed cultural site. The area has been shaped by continental drift, volcanism and glaciation. It is also important for its biodiversity; the fish Arctic charr (Salvelinus alpinus) has evolved into four different morphs in Lake Þingvallavatn in less than 10,000 years.
The Turf House Tradition	Keldur Earth covered homes with grass growing on the top	14 sites	2011	iii, iv (cultural)	The turf house tradition was brought to Iceland by the first settlers and has evolved from the longhouses. The structure of a turf house is built from timber and the house is covered by turf. The shape and functions of these houses changed over time, adapting to local climate and the needs of the people. Fourteen representative sites are listed in the nomination.
Torfajökull Volcanic System / Fjallabak Nature Reserve	Kaldaklofsfjöll panorama, rhyolitic rocks with snow and sparse vegetation	South Iceland	2013	vii, viii (natural)	The Torfajökull volcanic system includes a rhyolitic stratovolcano and a complex of subglacial volcanoes. It is an important site to study the rhyolitic formations produced during volcano-ice interactions. The system exhibits exceptionally diverse geothermal surface features, including fumaroles, mudpools, solfataras (fumaroles producing sulfurous gases), and hot springs. These are home to unique thermophilic bacteria and archaea.
