= List of World Heritage Sites in Malawi =

Location of World Heritage Sites in Malawi

The United Nations Educational, Scientific and Cultural Organization (UNESCO) World Heritage Sites are places of importance to cultural or natural heritage as described in the UNESCO World Heritage Convention, established in 1972. Cultural heritage consists of monuments (such as architectural works, monumental sculptures, or inscriptions), groups of buildings, and sites (including archaeological sites). Natural features (consisting of physical and biological formations), geological and physiographical formations (including habitats of threatened species of animals and plants), and natural sites which are important from the point of view of science, conservation, or natural beauty, are defined as natural heritage. Malawi accepted the convention, making its historical sites eligible for inclusion on the list. As of 2025, there are three World Heritage Sites in Malawi.

== World Heritage Sites ==
UNESCO lists sites under ten criteria; each entry must meet at least one of the criteria. Criteria i through vi are cultural, and vii through x are natural.

World Heritage Sites
Site	Image	Location (region)	Year listed	UNESCO data	Description
Lake Malawi National Park		Central Region, Southern Region	1984	289; vii, ix, x (natural)	
Chongoni Rock-Art Area		Central Region	2006	476rev; iii, vi (cultural)	
Mount Mulanje Cultural Landscape		Southern Region	2025	iii, vi (cultural)	

== Tentative list ==
In addition to sites inscribed on the World Heritage List, member states can maintain a list of tentative sites that they may consider for nomination. Nominations for the World Heritage List are only accepted if the site was previously listed on the tentative list. Malawi maintains seven properties on its tentative list.

Tentative sites
Site	Image	Location (region)	Year listed	UNESCO criteria	Description
Nyika-Vwaza Wildlife Reserve		Northern Region	2025	iii, v, viii, ix, x (mixed)	
Malawi Slave Heritage Route and Dr. David Livingstone Trail		Central Region	2025	iii, iv (cultural)	
Malape Pillars Geological Heritage		Southern Region	2025	vii, viii, x (natural)	
Lake Chilwa Wetland		Southern Region	2025	ix, x (natural)	
Khulubvi and Associated Mbona Rain Shrines Cultural Landscape		Southern Region	2025	iii, vi (cultural)	
Karonga Fossilised Geoheritage Landscape		Northern Region	2025	iii, viii, ix, x (mixed)	
Fort Mangochi and Makanjira Historical Corridor		Southern Region	2025	iii, iv, vi (cultural)	
