= List of World Heritage Sites in Mauritius =

Location of World Heritage Sites in Mauritius

The United Nations Educational, Scientific and Cultural Organization (UNESCO) World Heritage Sites are places of importance to cultural or natural heritage as described in the UNESCO World Heritage Convention, established in 1972. Cultural heritage consists of monuments (such as architectural works, monumental sculptures, or inscriptions), groups of buildings, and sites (including archaeological sites). Natural features (consisting of physical and biological formations), geological and physiographical formations (including habitats of threatened species of animals and plants), and natural sites which are important from the point of view of science, conservation or natural beauty, are defined as natural heritage. Mauritius accepted the convention on September 19, 1995, making its sites eligible for inclusion on the list.

As of 2024, Mauritius has two World Heritage Sites. Aapravasi Ghat was inscribed on the list at the 30th Session of the World Heritage Committee, held in Vilnius, Lithuania, in 2006. Le Morne Brabant was added to the list in 2008. Further minor modification of boundaries of this site took place in 2011. Both sites are listed as cultural sites, as determined by the organization's selection criteria. All World Heritage Sites in Mauritius are located on the island of Mauritius. Outer islands of the country do not feature any sites on the World Heritage list or on the tentative list. The country has served on the World Heritage Committee once.

== World Heritage Sites ==
UNESCO lists sites under ten criteria; each entry must meet at least one of the criteria. Criteria i through vi are cultural, and vii through x are natural.

World Heritage Sites
Site	Image	Location (district)	Year listed	UNESCO data	Description
Aapravasi Ghat	Aapravasi Ghat Museum	Port Louis	2006	1227; vi (cultural)	The modern indentured labour system started in Port Louis. In 1834, the British Government selected the island of Mauritius to be the first site for what it called ‘the great experiment’ in the use of ‘free’ labour to replace slaves. Between 1834 and 1920, almost half a million indentured labourers arrived from India at Aapravasi Ghat to work in the sugar plantations of Mauritius, or to be transferred to Reunion, Australia, southern and eastern Africa, or the Caribbean. The buildings of Aapravasi Ghat are among the earliest explicit manifestations of what was to become a global economic system and one of the greatest migrations in history.
Le Morne Cultural Landscape	View of the Le Morne peninsula	Rivière Noire	2008	1259bis; iii, vi (cultural)	Le Morne Cultural Landscape, a rugged mountain that juts into the Indian Ocean in the southwest of Mauritius was used as a shelter by runaway slaves, maroons, through the 18th and early years of the 19th centuries. Protected by the mountain's isolated, wooded and almost inaccessible cliffs, the escaped slaves formed small settlements in the caves and on the summit of Le Morne. The oral traditions associated with the maroons have made Le Morne a symbol of the slaves’ fight for freedom, their suffering and sacrifice, all of which have relevance to the countries from which the slaves came – the African mainland, Madagascar, India, and South-east Asia. Mauritius, an important stopover in the eastern slave trade, also became known as the “Maroon republic” because of the many escaped slaves who lived on Le Morne Mountain.

== Tentative list ==
In addition to the sites inscribed on the World Heritage list, member states can maintain a list of tentative sites that they may consider for nomination. Nominations for the World Heritage list are only accepted if the site has previously been listed on the tentative list. As of 2024, Mauritius had one site on its tentative list, added in 2006.

Tentative sites
Site	Image	Location (district)	Year listed	UNESCO criteria	Description
Black River Gorges National Park	Mare aux Joncs waterfall in the Black River Gorges National Park	Plaines Wilhems, Rivière Noire, Savanne	2006	vii, ix, x (natural)	Black River Gorges National Park has implemented a successful and cost-effective conservation program, particularly focusing on the preservation of Mauritius kestrel, pink pigeon, and echo parakeet. The site constitutes 3.5% of the island's landmass and includes ten conservation management areas covering approximately 50 hectares. It contains remnants of the native forests that existed in Mauritius before colonization. The park is home to 163 of the island's 311 endemic flora species and provides habitat for 28 endemic bird species.

== See also ==
- Sega (genre)
- Geet-Gawai
