= List of World Heritage Sites in Laos =

Location of World Heritage Sites in Laos

The United Nations Educational, Scientific and Cultural Organization (UNESCO) designates World Heritage Sites of outstanding universal value to cultural or natural heritage which have been nominated by countries which are signatories to the UNESCO World Heritage Convention, established in 1972. Cultural heritage consists of monuments (such as architectural works, monumental sculptures, or inscriptions), groups of buildings, and sites (including archaeological sites). Natural heritage consists of natural features (physical and biological formations), geological and physiographical formations (including habitats of threatened species of animals and plants), and natural sites which are important from the point of view of science, conservation, or natural beauty. Laos, officially the Lao People's Democratic Republic, ratified the convention on 20 March 1987.

As of 2025, Laos has four sites on the list. The town of Luang Prabang was listed in 1995, Vat Phou in 2001, the Plain of Jars in 2019, and Hin Nam No National Park in 2025. The first three sites are cultural, while the last is natural. In addition, Laos has two sites on its tentative list.

== World Heritage Sites ==
UNESCO lists sites under ten criteria; each entry must meet at least one of the criteria. Criteria i through vi are cultural, and vii through x are natural.

* Transnational site

World Heritage Sites
Site	Image	Location (province)	Year listed	UNESCO data	Description
Town of Luang Prabang	A Buddhist temple in golden colours	Luang Prabang	1995	479bis; ii, iv, v (cultural)	Luang Prabang, the capital of the Lan Xang kingdom between the 14th and 16th centuries, was the royal and religious seat of the French protectorate of Laos between 1893 and 1946. The architecture of the city represents fusion of two styles: the traditional Lao and that of colonial Europe from the late 19th and early 20th century. Buildings include Buddhist temples, administrative and residential buildings. The town is well preserved. A minor boundary modification took place in 2013.
Vat Phou and Associated Ancient Settlements within the Champasak Cultural Landscape	Palace ruins in Khmer style	Champasak	2001	481; iii, iv, vi (cultural)	Vat Phou (ruins pictured) is a Hindu temple constructed under the Khmer Empire which controlled the region from the 10th to 14th centuries. The cultural landscape also includes the remains of temples, towns, and water management structures, dating from the 5th to 15th centuries. The layout of the temple reflects the Hindu concept of an axis connecting mount Phou Khao with the Mekong river.
Megalithic Jar Sites in Xiengkhuang – Plain of Jars	Large stone jars under a tree	Xiangkhouang	2019	1587; iii (cultural)	This site comprises 15 individual locations with remains of an Iron Age megalithic culture that existed roughly from 500 BCE to 500 CE. The "jars" refer to more than 2000 tubular stone jars that were used for funerary practices. There are also stone disks that were perhaps used as lids for the jars, other burial sites, and quarries, present at the locations.
Phong Nha – Kẻ Bàng National Park and Hin Nam No National Park*	A grey and orange monkey sitting on a branch	Khammouane	2025	viii, ix, x (natural)	The site covers a limestone plateau that exhibits a series of tropical karst features, such as cliffs, conical hills, and cave systems. The area is home to several endangered primate species, including the southern white-cheeked gibbon, red-shanked douc (a zoo specimen pictured), and Indochinese black langur. There are at least four species of hornbills, including the threatened wreathed hornbill. This transnational site also includes the Phong Nha – Kẻ Bàng National Park in Vietnam, which was inscribed in 2003.

== Tentative list ==
In addition to sites inscribed on the World Heritage List, member states can maintain a list of tentative sites that they may consider for nomination. Nominations for the World Heritage List are only accepted if the site was previously listed on the tentative list. As of 2025, Laos lists two properties on its tentative list.

Tentative sites
Site	Image	Location (province)	Year listed	UNESCO criteria	Description
That Luang of Vientiane	A gold-covered Buddhist stupa	Vientiane	1992	ii, iv (cultural)	Pha That Luang is a large gold-covered Buddhist stupa. It was constructed under king Setthathirath in 1566 after he moved the capital of the Lan Xang kingdom to Vientiane. The stupa is believed to house a relic of Buddha. The spire of the stupa reaches 45 m (148 ft) while the main structure is surrounded by reliquaries and sculptures.
Nakai – Nam Theun National Park (NNT NP)		Khammouane and Bolikhamsai	2025	ix, x (natural)	The site, located on the Annamite Range, is one of the largest conservation areas in Laos. Its varied forests and wetlands are home to diverse flora and fauna, including many endemic species.
