= List of World Heritage Sites in Vanuatu =

Location of World Heritage Sites in Vanuatu

The United Nations Educational, Scientific and Cultural Organization (UNESCO) designates World Heritage Sites of outstanding universal value to cultural or natural heritage which have been nominated by countries which are signatories to the UNESCO World Heritage Convention, established in 1972. Cultural heritage consists of monuments (such as architectural works, monumental sculptures, or inscriptions), groups of buildings, and sites (including archaeological sites). Natural features (consisting of physical and biological formations), geological and physiographical formations (including habitats of threatened species of animals and plants), and natural sites which are important from the point of view of science, conservation or natural beauty, are defined as natural heritage. Vanuatu accepted the convention on June 13, 2002, making its historical sites eligible for inclusion on the list. As of 2023, Vanuatu has only one World Heritage Site.

== World Heritage Sites ==
UNESCO lists sites under ten criteria; each entry must meet at least one of the criteria. Criteria i through vi are cultural, and vii through x are natural.

† In danger

World Heritage Sites
Site	Image	Location (province)	Year listed	UNESCO data	Description
Chief Roi Mata's Domain	Cave drawings in Fels Cave, Lelepa Island	Shefa Province	2008	1280; iii, v, vi (cultural)	Chief Roi Mata's Domain is the first site to be inscribed in Vanuatu. It consists of three early 17th century AD sites on the islands of Efate, Lelepa and Artok associated with the life and death of the last paramount chief, or Roi Mata, of what is now Central Vanuatu. The property includes Roi Mata's residence, the site of his death and Roi Mata's mass burial site. It is closely associated with the oral traditions surrounding the chief and the moral values he espoused. The site reflects the convergence between oral tradition and archaeology and bears witness to the persistence of Roi Mata's social reforms and conflict resolution, still relevant to the people of the region.

== Tentative List ==
In addition to sites inscribed on the World Heritage List, member states can maintain a list of tentative sites that they may consider for nomination. Nominations for the World Heritage List are only accepted if the site was previously listed on the tentative list. As of 2025, Vanuatu has listed five properties on its tentative list.

Tentative sites
Site	Image	Location (province)	Year listed	UNESCO criteria	Description
Yalo, Apialo and the sacred geography of Northwest Malakula		Malampa Province	2004	iii (cultural)	
The President Coolidge		Sanma Province	2004	i, iii, iv, v (cultural)	
Vatthe Conservation Area	Champagne Beach in North Santo	Sanma Province	2004	vii, ix, x (natural)	
Lake Letas	Mount Gharat and Lake Letas on Gaua Island in northern Vanuatu	Torba Province	2004	vii, ix, x (natural)	
The Nowon and Votwos of Ureparapara		Torba Province	2005	iii, iv, v (cultural)	
