= List of World Heritage Sites in Namibia =

Location of World Heritage Sites in Namibia

The United Nations Educational, Scientific and Cultural Organization (UNESCO) World Heritage Sites are places of importance to cultural or natural heritage as described in the UNESCO World Heritage Convention, established in 1972. Cultural heritage consists of monuments (such as architectural works, monumental sculptures, or inscriptions), groups of buildings, and sites (including archaeological sites). Natural features (consisting of physical and biological formations), geological and physiographical formations (including habitats of threatened species of animals and plants), and natural sites which are important from the point of view of science, conservation or natural beauty, are defined as natural heritage. Namibia accepted the convention on April 6, 2000, making its historical sites eligible for inclusion on the list. As of 2023, there are two World Heritage Sites in Namibia.

== World Heritage Sites ==
UNESCO lists sites under ten criteria; each entry must meet at least one of the criteria. Criteria i through vi are cultural, and vii through x are natural.

* Transnational site

World Heritage Sites
Site	Image	Location (region)	Year listed	UNESCO data	Description
Twyfelfontein or /Ui-//aes		Kunene Region	2007	iii, v (cultural)	Twyfelfontein or /Ui-//aes has one of the largest concentrations of [...] petroglyphs, i.e. rock engravings in Africa. Most of these well-preserved engravings represent rhinoceros, . The site also includes six painteelephant, ostrich and giraffe, as well as drawings of human and animal footprintsd rock shelters with motifs of human figures in red ochre. The objects excavated from two sections, date from the Late Stone Age. The site forms a coherent, extensive and high-quality record of ritual practices relating to hunter-gatherer communities in this part of southern Africa over at least 2,000 years, and eloquently illustrates the links between the ritual and economic practices of hunter-gatherers.
Namib Sand Sea		Kunene Region, Erongo Region, Hardap Region, ǁKaras Region	2013	vii, viii, ix, x (natural)	Namib Sand Sea is the only coastal desert in the world that includes extensive dune fields influenced by fog. Covering an area of over three million hectares and a buffer zone of 899,500 hectares, the site is composed of two dune systems, an ancient semi-consolidated one overlain by a younger active one. The desert dunes are formed by the transportation of materials thousands of kilometres from the hinterland, that are carried by river, ocean current and wind. It features gravel plains, coastal flats, rocky hills, inselbergs within the sand sea, a coastal lagoon and ephemeral rivers, resulting in a landscape of exceptional beauty. Fog is the primary source of water in the site, accounting for a unique environment in which endemic invertebrates, reptiles and mammals adapt to an ever-changing variety of microhabitats and ecological niches.

== Tentative List ==
In addition to sites inscribed on the World Heritage List, member states can maintain a list of tentative sites that they may consider for nomination. Nominations for the World Heritage List are only accepted if the site was previously listed on the tentative list. Namibia maintains 8 properties on its tentative list.

Tentative sites
Site	Image	Location (region)	Year listed	UNESCO criteria	Description
Brandberg National Monument Area		Erongo Region	2002	(mixed)	
Fishriver Canyon		Karas Region	2002	vii, viii, ix (natural)	
Welwitschia Plains		Kunene Region, Erongo Region	2002	x (natural)	
Benguela Current Marine Ecosystem Sites		Karas Region, Erongo Region	2016	iv, ix, x (mixed)	
Etosha Pan		Kunene Region, Oshikoto Region	2016	vii, viii, ix (natural)	
Sān Living Cultural Landscape		Otjozondjupa Region	2016	v, vi (cultural)	
Succulent Karoo Protected Areas		Karas Region	2016	ix, x (natural)	
Okavango Delta		Kavango East Region, Zambezi Region	2016	vii, ix, x (natural)	
