= List of World Heritage Sites in Fiji =

Location of World Heritage Sites in Fiji

The United Nations Educational, Scientific and Cultural Organization (UNESCO) World Heritage Sites are places of importance to cultural or natural heritage as described in the UNESCO World Heritage Convention, established in 1972. Cultural heritage consists of monuments (such as architectural works, monumental sculptures, or inscriptions), groups of buildings, and sites (including archaeological sites). Natural features (consisting of physical and biological formations), geological and physiographical formations (including habitats of threatened species of animals and plants), and natural sites which are important from the point of view of science, conservation or natural beauty, are defined as natural heritage. Fiji accepted the convention on November 21, 1990, making its historical sites eligible for inclusion on the list. As of 2023, Fiji has only one World Heritage Site

== World Heritage Sites ==
UNESCO lists sites under ten criteria; each entry must meet at least one of the criteria. Criteria i through vi are cultural, and vii through x are natural.

* Transnational site

World Heritage Sites
Site	Image	Location (division)	Year listed	UNESCO data	Description
Levuka Historical Port Town	A red-roofed church with white walls can be seen. Behind the church is an old, dark clock tower. Both buildings are surrounded by level and freshly cut grass.	Eastern Division	2013	1399; ii, v (cultural)	The town and its low line of buildings set among coconut and mango trees along the beach front was the first colonial capital of Fiji, ceded to the British in 1874. It developed from the early 19th century as a centre of commercial activity by Americans and Europeans who built warehouses, stores, port facilities, residences, and religious, educational and social institutions around the villages of the South Pacific island's indigenous population. It is a rare example of a late colonial port town that was influenced in its development by the indigenous community which continued to outnumber the European settlers. Thus the town, an outstanding example of late 19th century Pacific port settlements, reflects the integration of local building traditions by a supreme naval power, leading to the emergence of a unique landscape.

== Tentative list ==
In addition to sites inscribed on the World Heritage List, member states can maintain a list of tentative sites that they may consider for nomination. Nominations for the World Heritage List are only accepted if the site was previously listed on the tentative list. Fiji has three properties on its tentative list.

Tentative sites
Site	Image	Location (division)	Year listed	UNESCO criteria	Description
Sovi Basin		Eastern Division	1999	iii, iv, v (cultural)	
Sigatoka Sand Dunes	Sand dunes near the beach	Western Division	1999	iii, iv, v (cultural)	
Yaduataba Crested Iguana Sanctuary	A Fiji crested iguana on a branch.	Northern Division	1999	x (natural)	
