= List of World Heritage Sites in Botswana =

Location of World Heritage Sites in Botswana

The United Nations Educational, Scientific and Cultural Organization (UNESCO) World Heritage Sites are places of importance to cultural or natural heritage as described in the UNESCO World Heritage Convention, established in 1972. Cultural heritage consists of monuments (such as architectural works, monumental sculptures, or inscriptions), groups of buildings, and sites (including archaeological sites). Natural features (consisting of physical and biological formations), geological and physiographical formations (including habitats of threatened species of animals and plants), and natural sites that are important from the point of view of science, conservation, or natural beauty are defined as natural heritage. Botswana accepted the convention on 23 November 1998.

There are two World Heritage Sites in Botswana, with a further seven on the tentative list. The first site in Botswana to be inscribed on the list was Tsodilo Hills in 2001. The most recent site listed was the Okavango Delta in 2014, which became the 1000th site on the list. It was listed for its natural significance while Tsodilo was listed for its cultural significance.

== World Heritage Sites ==
UNESCO lists sites under ten criteria; each entry must meet at least one of the criteria. Criteria i through vi are cultural, and vii through x are natural.

World Heritage Sites
Site	Image	Location (district)	Year listed	UNESCO data	Description
Tsodilo	Rock art depicting giraffes and other animals	Ngamiland	2001	1021; i, iii, vi (cultural)	The Tsodilo Hills are quartzite rocky outcrops in the Kalahari Desert. Archaeological excavations have uncovered traces of intermittent human occupation for over at least 100,000 years. People used the caves for shelter and created rock art, resulting in over 4,500 preserved paintings, which makes Tsodilo one of the sites with the highest concentrations of rock art in the world. The site remains an important spiritual centre for the Hambukushu and San communities.
Okavango Delta	An aerial view of the delta	Ngamiland	2014	1432; vii, ix, x (natural)	The Okavango Delta in the Kalahari Desert is Africa's third largest alluvial fan, and largest endorheic delta. The Okavango River and its annual floodings revitalize the landscape during the peak dry season in June and July. The waters support large mammals, including African elephant, cheetah, black and white rhinoceros, and African wild dog. The wetlands are also home to numerous bird species, including six vulture species, southern ground hornbill, wattled crane, and Slaty egret.

== Tentative list ==
In addition to sites inscribed on the World Heritage List, member states can maintain a list of tentative sites that they may consider for nomination. Nominations for the World Heritage List are only accepted if the site was previously listed on the tentative list. Botswana maintains seven properties on its tentative list.

* Transnational site

Tentative sites
Site	Image	Location (district)	Year listed	UNESCO criteria	Description
Toutswemogala Hill Iron Age Settlement		Central	1999	ii, iii, iv (cultural)	Toutswemogala Hill, rising around 50 metres (160 ft) above mopane plains, has remains of an Iron Age settlement that was occupied on two occasions between the 7th and the 19th centuries. It was founded by the Toutswe people who moved to the area and practiced cattle farming, supplemented by sheep, goats, foraging, and hunting. Remains include a surrounding stone wall, house floors, and burial sites.
Central Kalahari Game Reserve		Ghanzi and Kweneng	2010	v, vii, ix (mixed)	This game reserve, established in 1971, is located in central Botswana in the Kalahari Basin. It is a mosaic landscape with claypans, fossil river valleys, woodlands, and sand dunes. Animals in the park include the brown hyena, black maned lion, and several birds of prey. The area is inhabited by the indigenous hunter-gatherer San and the Bakgalagadi people who have been practicing a sustainable way of life in harsh dry conditions for millennia.
Chobe Linyanti System	Some gnus and zebras at a body of water in the park	Chobe	2010	ix, x (natural)	This nomination comprises the Linyati River in the north and the Chobe National Park in the east. The area features numerous diverse habitats, including dense teak forests, grasslands, savannas, and wetlands, and the landscape changes with the interplay of wet and dry seasons. A mostly undisturbed area supports high concentrations of large mammals, including African bush elephant, African buffalo, and Burchell's zebra. Large predators include the lion, cheetah, and leopard. The wetlands support numerous birds from the stork family, including the African openbill, saddle-billed stork, and marabou stork.
Mapungubwe Cultural Landscape*		Central	2010	ii, iii, iv, v (cultural)	This is a proposed extension to the existing World Heritage Site listed in South Africa. The Kingdom of Mapungubwe was the first large kingdom in southern Africa, existing roughly between 900 and 1300. It was located in an open savanna at the confluence of the Limpopo and Shashe rivers, in the area which is today part of South Africa, Botswana, and Zimbabwe. They traded with India and China and produced gold and ivory. The kingdom collapsed because of the climate change, as droughts rendered the area unsuitable for agriculture. Remains of palaces and settlements have been preserved, in Botswana, the Mmamagwe site is the best studied.
Gcwihaba Caves		Ngamiland	2010	vii, viii (natural)	This nomination comprises six cave systems with a wide variety of speleothems. Some caves include breccia rich in fossils, as well as thick deposits of windblown sand. These deposits provide insight into the climate of the region at least since the Pleistocene epoch.
Makgadikgadi Pans Landscape	A large baobab without leaves in the pans	Central	2010	v, vii, viii, x (mixed)	The Makgadikgadi salt pans are the remains of a massive Lake Makgadikgadi that dried up after geological processes diverted the major inflow rivers. Parts of the area still get flooded during the wet season. There are several protected areas that are important breeding grounds for the greater and lesser flamingo. Traces of human occupation since the Palaeolithic have been found in the region, including Acheulean stone tools and hundreds of stone walls and cairns.
Tswapong Hills Cultural Landscape	Rocky formations partially covered by vegetation	Central	2010	v, vi (cultural)	The area, consisting of hard rocks intersected by gorges carved by seasonal rivers, has been occupied since the Palaeolithic. Archaeological findings include rock paintings and remains of iron smelting sites, as rich deposits influenced the long tradition of iron metallurgy in the area. In the 19th century, the hills were the site of the Ngwato capital, along with the church built with the leadership of Kgosi (king) Khama III. The Batswapong/Bapedi people from surrounding villages consider the hills as sacred, they believe that their ancestors live there and that they control everything that is happening in the area.
