= List of World Heritage Sites in Comoros =

Location of World Heritage Sites in Comoros. All sites shown are the Medinas of the Historic Sultanates.

The United Nations Educational, Scientific and Cultural Organization (UNESCO) World Heritage Sites are places of importance to cultural or natural heritage as described in the UNESCO World Heritage Convention, established in 1972. Cultural heritage comprises monuments (such as architectural works, monumental sculptures, or inscriptions), groups of buildings, and sites (including archaeological ones). Natural heritage comprises natural features (such as physical and biological formations), geological and physiographical formations (including habitats of threatened flora and fauna), and natural sites which are important for scientific research, conservation or natural aesthetic. Comoros accepted the convention on 27 September 2000, making its historical sites eligible for inclusion on the list. The sole World Heritage Site in the Comoros – the Medinas of the Historic Sultanates of the Comoros – was listed in 2026 for its cultural significance. It also has three tentative sites.

== World Heritage Site ==
UNESCO lists sites under ten criteria; each entry must meet at least one of the criteria. Criteria i through vi are cultural, and vii through x are natural.

World Heritage Sites
Site	Image	Location	Year listed	UNESCO data	Description
The Medinas of the Historic Sultanates of the Comoros		Ngazidja, Ndzwani	2026	1768; iii, iv (cultural)	

== Tentative list ==
In addition to sites inscribed on the World Heritage List, member states can maintain a list of tentative sites for nomination consideration. Nominations for the list are only accepted if the site had been on the tentative list. Comoros has three properties on its tentative list.

World Heritage Sites
Site	Image	Location (island)	Year listed	UNESCO data	Description
Marine Ecosystems in the Comoros Archipelago		Mwali, Ngazidja, Ndzwani	2007	ix, x (natural)	
Terrestrial Ecosystems and Cultural Landscape in the Comoros Archipelago		Mwali, Ngazidja, Ndzwani	2007	v, vii, ix, x (mixed)	
Cultural landscape of the Perfume Plantations of the Islands of the Moon		Ndzwani	2007	ii, iv, v (cultural)	
Royal and political site of Mbaé Trambwé		Ngazidja	2026	iii , iv, vi (cultural)	
Royal Site and Historic Landscape of Nyumbadju - Chongoduda		Ngazidja	2026	iii , v, vi (cultural)	
Sacred Cultural Landscape of Salt Lake and the Chiouda Mosque of Bangoi Kouni		Ngazidja	2026	iii , v, vi (cultural)	
The Cultural Landscape of the Dzialandzé – Sima – Moya Plantations		Anjouan	2026	iii , v, vi (cultural)	
Coelacanth National Park		Ngazidja	2026	viii , x (natural)	
Karthala National Park		Ngazidja	2026	vii , viii, x (natural)	
Mohéli Marine Park		Mohéli	2026	vii , ix, x (natural)	
Simamboini Mangrove		Ngazidja	2026	vii , ix, x (natural)	
Mohéli Terrestrial Ecosystem and Cultural Landscape		Mohéli	2026	v, viii , ix, x (mixed)	
