= List of World Heritage Sites in Togo =

Location of World Heritage Sites in Togo

The United Nations Educational, Scientific and Cultural Organization (UNESCO) World Heritage Sites are places of importance to cultural or natural heritage as described in the UNESCO World Heritage Convention, established in 1972. Cultural heritage consists of monuments (such as architectural works, monumental sculptures, or inscriptions), groups of buildings, and sites (including archaeological sites). Natural features (consisting of physical and biological formations), geological and physiographical formations (including habitats of threatened species of animals and plants), and natural sites which are important from the point of view of science, conservation, or natural beauty, are defined as natural heritage. Togo accepted the convention on April 15, 1998, making its historical sites eligible for inclusion on the list. As of 2023, Togo has only one World Heritage Site, Koutammakou, the Land of the Batammariba, which it's shared with Benin.

== World Heritage Sites ==
UNESCO lists sites under ten criteria; each entry must meet at least one of the criteria. Criteria i through vi are cultural, and vii through x are natural.

* Transnational site

World Heritage Sites
Site	Image	Location (region)	Year listed	UNESCO data	Description
Koutammakou, the Land of the Batammariba*	Houses and other buildings in a village in the tropics	Kara Region	2004	1140bis; v, vi (cultural)	The Koutammakou landscape in north-eastern Togo and neighbouring Benin is home to the Batammariba, whose remarkable mud tower-houses are known as takienta (sikien in the plural). Nature is strongly associated with the rituals and beliefs of society here. The landscape is exceptional due to the architecture of the tower-houses which reflect the social structure; its farmland and forest; and the associations between people and landscape. The buildings are grouped in villages, which also include ceremonial spaces, springs, sacred rocks and sites reserved for initiation ceremonies.

== Tentative List ==
In addition to sites inscribed on the World Heritage List, member states can maintain a list of tentative sites that they may consider for nomination. Nominations for the World Heritage List are only accepted if the site was previously listed on the tentative list. Togo maintains 4 properties on its tentative list.

Tentative sites
Site	Image	Location (region)	Year listed	UNESCO criteria	Description
Aného-Glidji Aglomeration		Maritime Region	2021	iii, iv (cultural)	
Serial Granaries of the caves of Nok, Mamproug, Kouba and Bagou		Savanes Region	2021	iv, vi (cultural)	
Bassar Ancient Iron Metallurgy Sites		Kara Region	2021	iv, vi (cultural)	
Fazao Malfakassa National Park		Centrale Region, Kara Region	2021	x (natural)	
