= List of World Heritage Sites in Suriname =

Location of World Heritage Sites in Suriname

The United Nations Educational, Scientific and Cultural Organization (UNESCO) World Heritage Sites are places of importance to cultural or natural heritage as described in the UNESCO World Heritage Convention, established in 1972. Cultural heritage consists of monuments (such as architectural works, monumental sculptures, or inscriptions), groups of buildings, and sites (including archaeological sites). Natural features (consisting of physical and biological formations), geological and physiographical formations (including habitats of threatened species of animals and plants), and natural sites which are important from the point of view of science, conservation, or natural beauty, are defined as natural heritage. Suriname accepted the convention on 23 October 1997, making its sites eligible for inclusion on the list.

As of 2026, Suriname has three World Heritage Sites, two of which are cultural sites, and one is a natural site. The first site inscribed on the list is the Central Suriname Nature Reserve, in 2000, followed by the Historic Inner City of Paramaribo, in 2002, and the Jodensavanne Archeological Site, in 2023. Suriname has no sites on its tentative list.

== World Heritage Sites ==
UNESCO lists sites under ten criteria; each entry must meet at least one of the criteria. Criteria i through vi are cultural, and vii through x are natural.

World Heritage Sites
Site	Image	Location	Year listed	UNESCO data	Description
Central Suriname Nature Reserve		Sipaliwini District	2000	1017; ix, x (natural)	This nature reserve was founded in 1998, and comprises 1.6 million hectares of tropical forest. The site contains a high diversity of wildlife, including 400 bird species, eight species of primates, and more than 5,000 collected vascular plant species.
Historic Inner City of Paramaribo		Paramaribo District	2002	940rev; ii, iv (cultural)	During the 17th and 18th centuries, Paramaribo was a Dutch colonial town. The city's buildings include the architectural influence of the Dutch and other European influences, and later North American influences.
Jodensavanne Archaeological Site: Jodensavanne Settlement and Cassipora Creek Cemetery		Para District	2023	1680; iii (cultural)	This site consists of the Jodensavanne Settlement, founded in the 1680s, and the Cassipora Creek Cemetery, formerly part of an older settlement founded in the 1650s. The Jodensavanne Settlement was believed to house the oldest synagogue of architectural significance in the Americas.
