= Sangha Trinational =

UNESCO World Heritage Site in Central Africa

UNESCO World Heritage Site
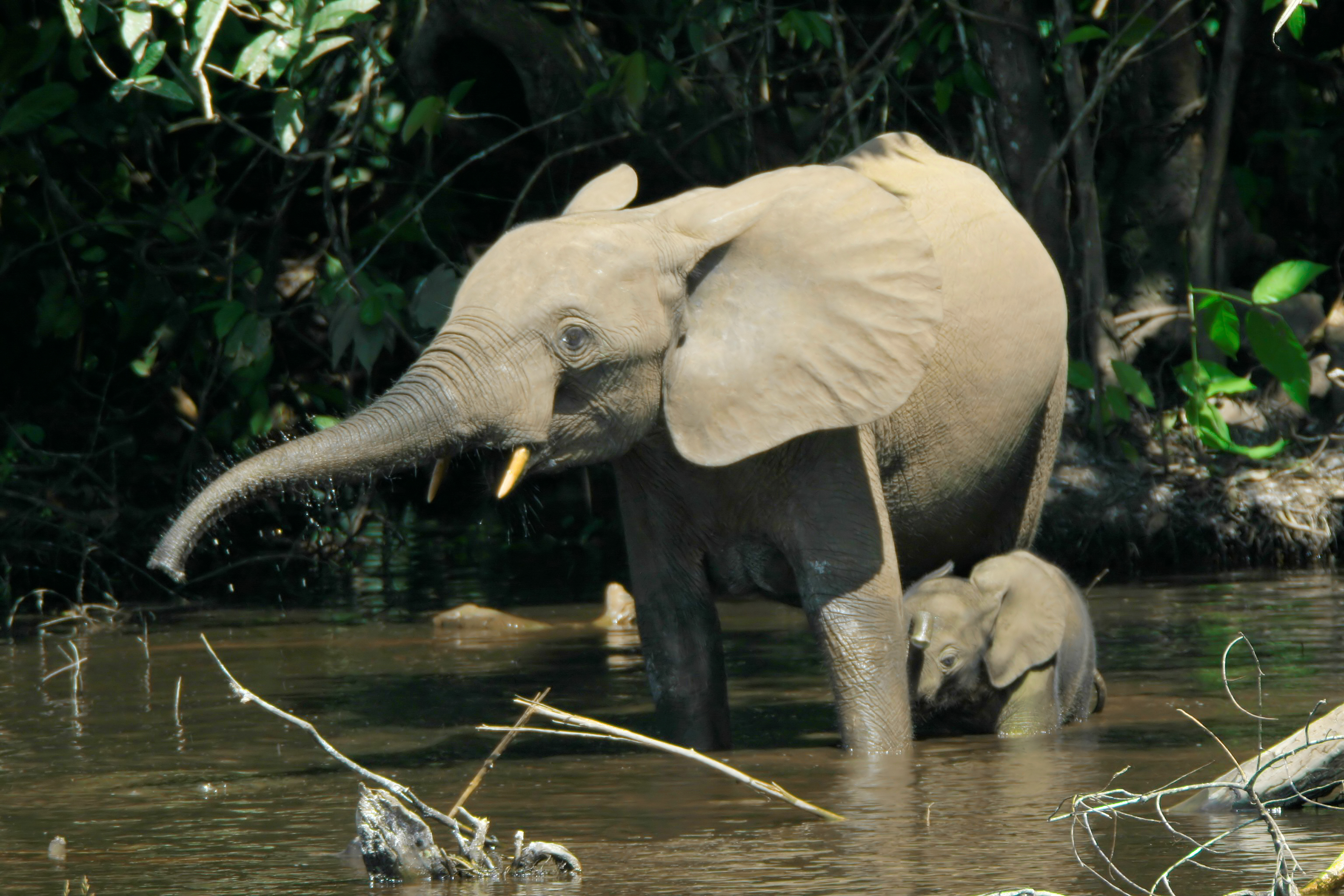
- African forest elephants at Nouabalé-Ndoki National Park in the Republic of the Congo

- Location within Africa
- Includes: 1. Nouabalé-Ndoki National Park (Republic of the Congo); 2. Lobéké National Park (Cameroon); 3. Dzanga-Ndoki National Park (Central African Republic)
- Criteria: (ix), (x)
- Reference: 1380rev
- Inscription: 2012 (36th Session)
- Area: 7,463.09 km^{2} (2,881.52 sq mi)
- Buffer zone: 17,879.5 km^{2} (6,903.3 sq mi)
- Coordinates: 2°36′34″N 16°33′15″E

Sangha Trinational (French: Trinational de la Sangha, TNS) is a forest divided between the nations of the Central African Republic, Cameroon and Republic of the Congo. It was added as a UNESCO World Heritage Site in 2012 because of its outstanding biodiversity and unique biological communities. The site includes three contiguous national parks within the humid tropical forests of Central Africa: Nouabalé-Ndoki National Park in Congo, Lobéké National Park in Cameroon, and Dzanga-Ndoki National Park in the Central African Republic. The large size of the site and the relatively limited amount of deforestation within the three parks has allowed populations of vulnerable species such as African forest elephants, gorillas, sitatunga, and chimpanzees to thrive. In addition, populations of critically endangered plant species such as Mukulungu are protected within the site's borders.

== Geography ==
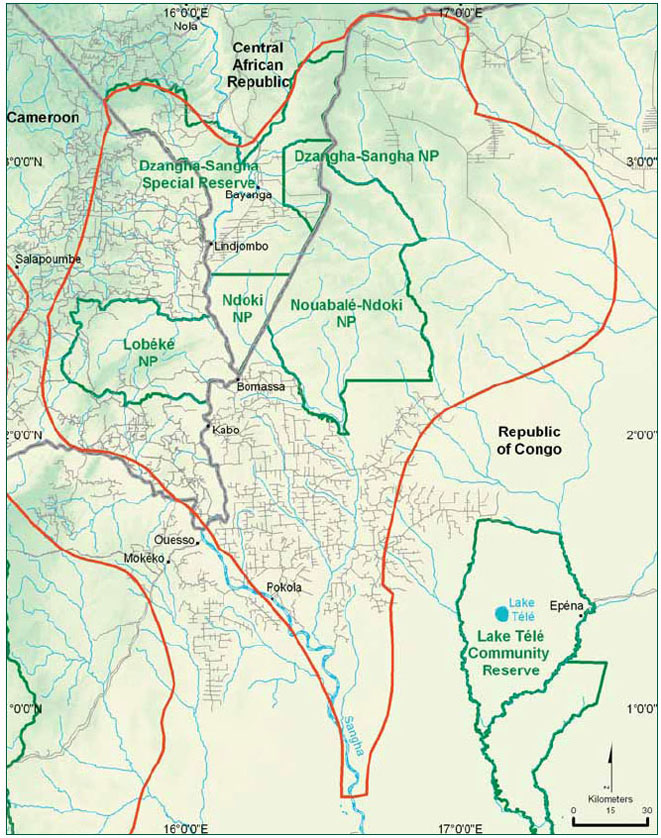
Map of Sangha Trinational

The Sangha Trinational covers 7,463 km^{2} (2,881 sq mi) of protected rainforest in southeastern Cameroon, southwestern Central African Republic and northern Republic of the Congo. It consists of three adjoining protected areas: Lobéké National Park, Dzanga-Ndoki National Park and Nouabalé-Ndoki National Park, which together form one of the largest continuous protected forest landscapes in the Congo Basin.

The landscape is crossed by the Sangha River and its tributaries, with extensive lowland rainforest, swamp forests and natural forest clearings known as bais. Among the best known are Dzanga Bai, famous for its concentrations of African forest elephants, and other mineral-rich clearings that attract a wide variety of wildlife throughout the year.

== History ==
The Sangha region forms part of one of the largest continuous blocks of tropical rainforest in the Congo Basin, extending across present-day Cameroon, the Central African Republic and the Republic of the Congo. Although divided by international borders, these forests have long functioned as a single ecological unit, with wildlife moving freely between what are now three separate countries. This ecological continuity highlighted the need for a coordinated transboundary conservation strategy.

A major step towards regional cooperation was the signing of the Yaoundé Declaration on 17 March 1999 by the heads of state of several Central African countries. The declaration established a common framework for the sustainable management of the forests of the Congo Basin and promoted the creation of jointly managed protected areas.

On 7 December 2000, the governments of Cameroon, the Central African Republic and the Republic of the Congo signed the cooperation agreement establishing the Sangha Trinational (TNS). The agreement created a framework for the coordinated management of the three protected areas, promoting biodiversity conservation, scientific research, anti-poaching measures, sustainable tourism and the long-term protection of the region's ecosystems.

The project was further strengthened in 2007 with the creation of the Tri-National de la Sangha Foundation, established to provide long-term financial support for conservation activities across the three parks.

International recognition came in 2012, when Sangha Trinational was inscribed on the UNESCO World Heritage List under criteria (ix) and (x), acknowledging both its outstanding ecological processes and its exceptional importance for biodiversity conservation in Central Africa.

== Biodiversity ==
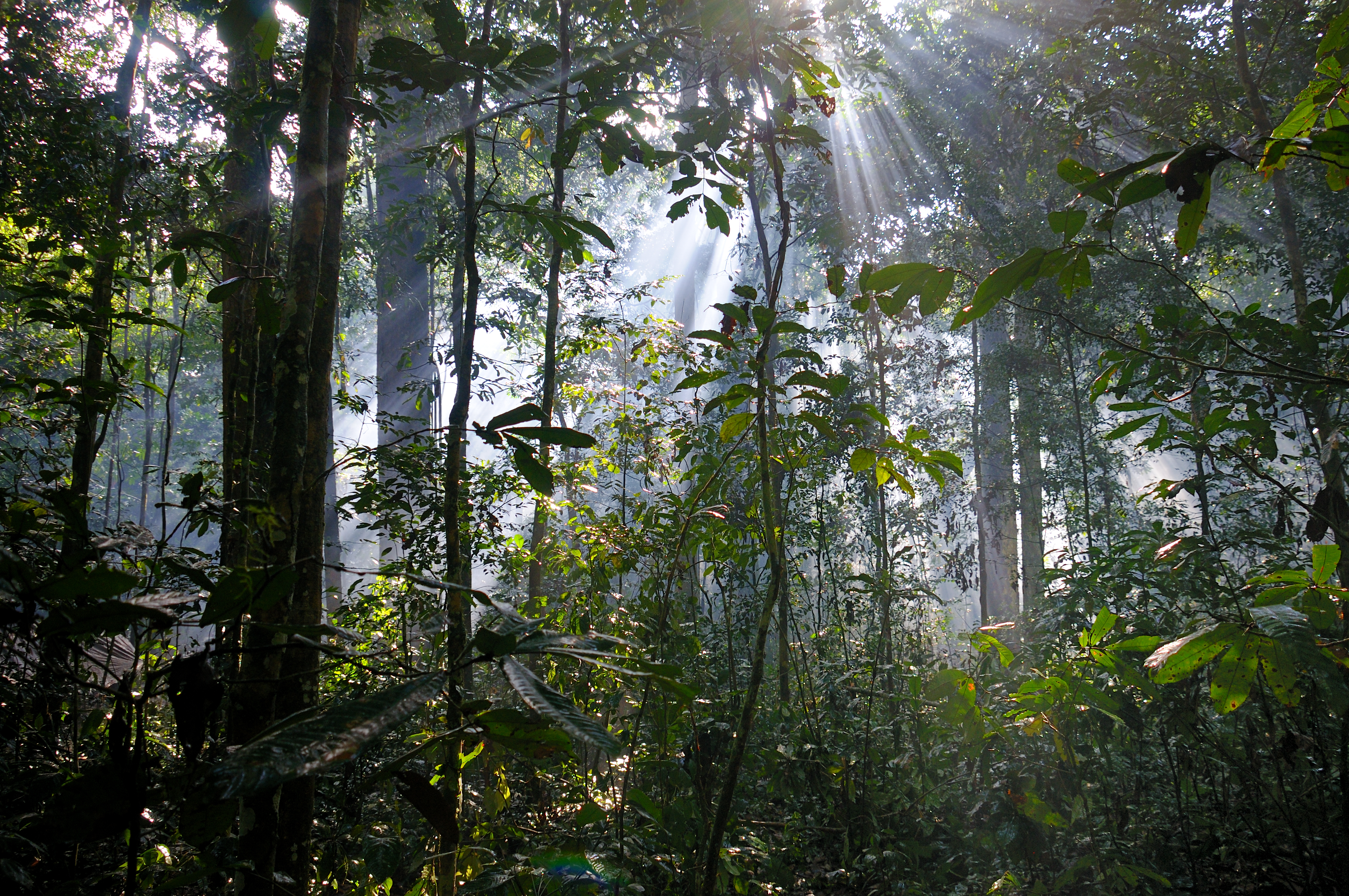
Primary rainforest in the Sangha Trinational.

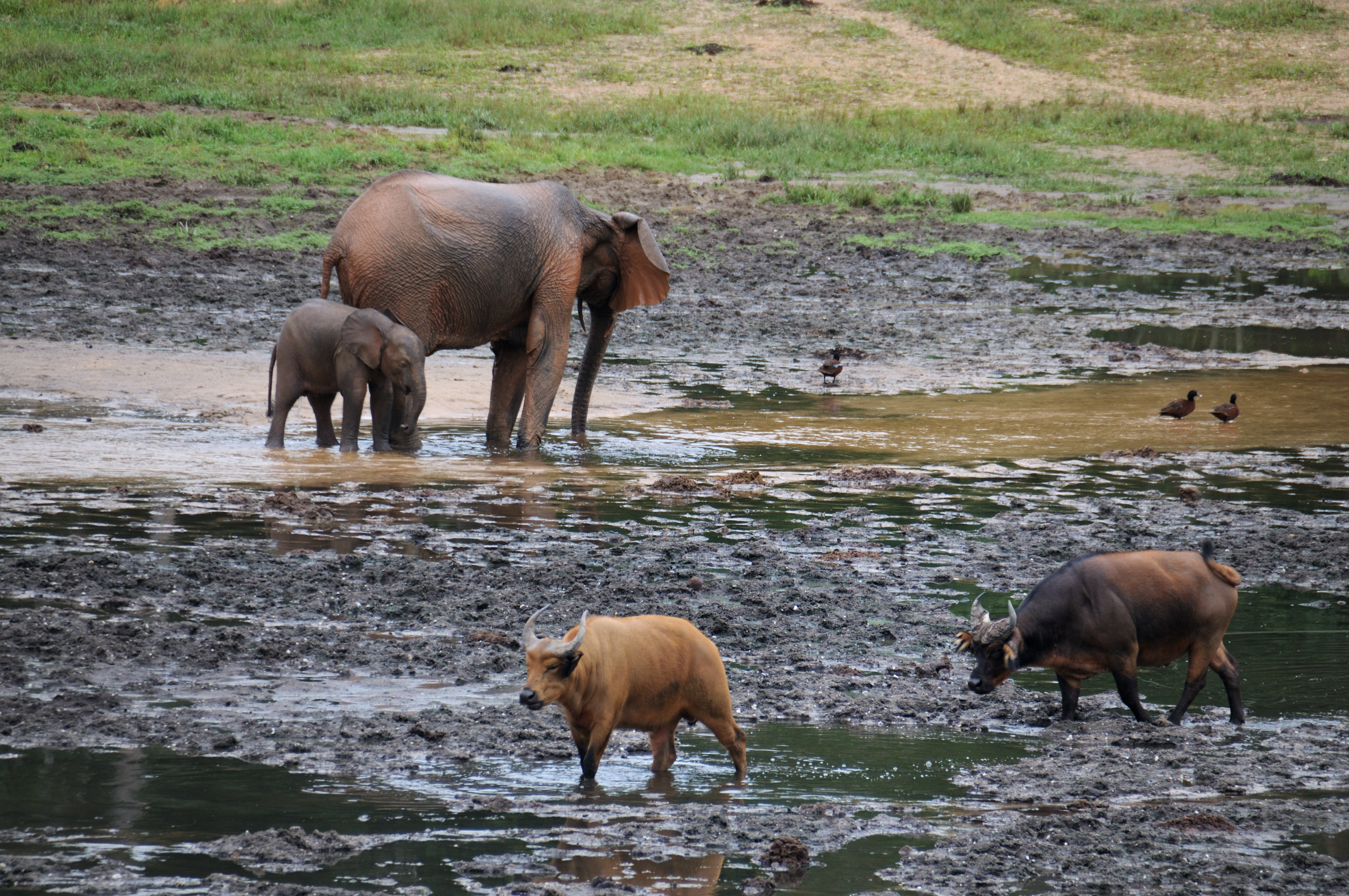
African forest elephants and African buffalo at Dzanga Bai, one of the best-known forest clearings in the Sangha Trinational.

The Sangha Trinational protects one of the most intact rainforest ecosystems in the Congo Basin and supports an exceptional diversity of plant and animal life. Its continuous forests, rivers, swamps and natural clearings provide habitat for many species that have declined elsewhere in Central Africa owing to habitat loss and hunting.

Large mammals are particularly well represented. The three protected areas support important populations of African forest elephants, western lowland gorillas, central chimpanzees, African forest buffalos, bongos, sitatunga, several species of duiker, leopards and pangolins. The uninterrupted forest allows many of these species to move freely across international borders, one of the key ecological values recognised by UNESCO.

More than 370 species of birds have been recorded in the landscape, including forest specialists such as the Sangha robin (Stiphrornis sanghensis), the grey-necked rockfowl and the grey parrot. The forests also support a rich diversity of reptiles, amphibians, butterflies, beetles and a rich diversity of invertebrates characteristic of the Congo Basin rainforest.
