= Lidjombo =

- Location in Central African Republic
- Coordinates: 2°42′8″N 16°6′2″E
- Country: Central African Republic
- Prefecture: Sangha-Mbaéré
- Sub-prefecture: Bayanga
- Commune: Yobe-Sangha

Area
  - Total: 2.9 sq mi (7.6 km^{2})

Population (2021)
  - Total: 971
  - Density: 330/sq mi (130/km^{2})

Lidjombo, also spelled Lindjombo, is a village located in the southern prefecture of Sangha-Mbaéré, Central African Republic. It is situated within the Dzanga-Sangha Special Reserve.

In the past, the villagers heavily relied on coffee farming and logging for their livelihood. However, those two sectors ended their operations 1980s, making Lidjombo declared a "dead town."

== Etymology ==
The name of the village originated from a name of fish, Jombo, that was ubiquitous across Sangha River when the village was established.

== History ==
Some people who did not like to work at the coffee plantation in Mompagana moved from the village and founded a settlement named Lidjombo in 1919. In the mid-1920s, Santini and Lopez built coffee plantations in the village, drawing many Mpiemu, Gbaya, and Baka to dwell in the village.

Around the mid-50s, Lidjombo faced a coffee boom and it attracted many people to migrate to the village because of the good salary. However, the coffee production ceased operation in 1981 after the owner left the village. As a result, the coffee farm is covered by vines. Nevertheless, as of 1988, the former coffee plantation workers remained in Lidjombo.

In April 2013, Front pour la Libération et l'Indépendance de la Sangha-Mbaéré (FLISM) controlled Lidjombo.

== Demography ==
Lidjombo is a multi-ethnic settlement. Various ethnic groups, which are Sangha Sangha, Mpiemo, Mbaya, Kaké, Manja, Gbaka, Banda, Bossa-Goma, and Baka people inhabit the village.

== Economy ==
The villagers depend on several sectors for their livelihood, such as farming, hunting, gathering, distilling local alcohol, and commerce.

== Education ==
The village has one primary school.

== Healthcare ==
Lidjombo has one health post.

== Security ==
The village's security is served by a police post and a national Gendarme Brigade office.

== Transport ==
In 1976 a logging company, Slovenia-Bois, built a road connecting the Lidjombo to the rest of the country, thus freeing the village from isolation.

== Bibliography ==
- Noss, Andrew J. (1995). "3". Duikers, Cables, And Nets : A Cultural Ecology Of Hunting In A Central African Forest (Thesis). University of Florida. p. 120.
