= Babongo, Central African Republic =

Babongo
- Location in Central African Republic
- Coordinates: 3°0′39″N 16°15′37″E
- Country: Central African Republic
- Prefecture: Sangha-Mbaéré
- Sub-prefecture: Bayanga
- Commune: Yobe-Sangha

Population (2021)
  - Total: 654

Babongo is a village situated within the Dzanga-Sangha Special Reserve in Sangha-Mbaéré Prefecture, Central African Republic.

== History ==
Babongo was founded in the late 1970s.

== Economy ==
Agriculture and hunting are the main economic activities for the villagers. Some of the villagers engaged in fish farm activities. There is also a market in the village.

== Education ==
There is one school in the village.

== Healthcare ==
Babongo has one health post.
