= Andrea Turkalo =

American conservation biologist

Andrea K. Turkalo
- Known for: Long-term study of African forest elephants at Dzanga Bai
- Scientific career
- Fields: Conservation biology
- Institutions: Wildlife Conservation Society

Andrea K. Turkalo is an American conservation biologist known for her long-term study of African forest elephants at Dzanga Bai, a forest clearing in the Dzanga-Sangha Special Reserve of the Central African Republic. Since 1990, she has conducted one of the longest continuous field studies of African forest elephants, documenting the behaviour, demography and social structure of individually identified animals.

At Dzanga Bai, Turkalo developed a long-term monitoring programme based on the identification of individual elephants. Her research has provided important insights into the species' biology, reproduction, social organisation and population dynamics, and has contributed to conservation efforts across Central Africa.

Her long-term observations have resulted in one of the most comprehensive datasets on African forest elephants and have contributed to research on their behaviour, life history and conservation. She has also documented the impacts of poaching and civil conflict on elephant populations in Central Africa.

== Early life and career ==
Turkalo first travelled to the Central African Republic in 1980 as a volunteer with the Peace Corps. After returning to the United States, she worked as a high school science teacher in the South Bronx, New York City.

In 1990, she returned to the Central African Republic with her then husband, biologist Michael Fay, to work on a World Wide Fund for Nature (WWF) project in the newly established Dzanga-Ndoki National Park. Fay was responsible for training park guards, while Turkalo coordinated a rural health programme for local communities.

The same year, WWF offered funding for a long-term study of the forest elephants that regularly gathered at Dzanga Bai. Although she had no previous experience studying elephants, Turkalo was awarded the project and began what would become one of the longest continuous field studies of African forest elephants.

== Research at Dzanga Bai ==
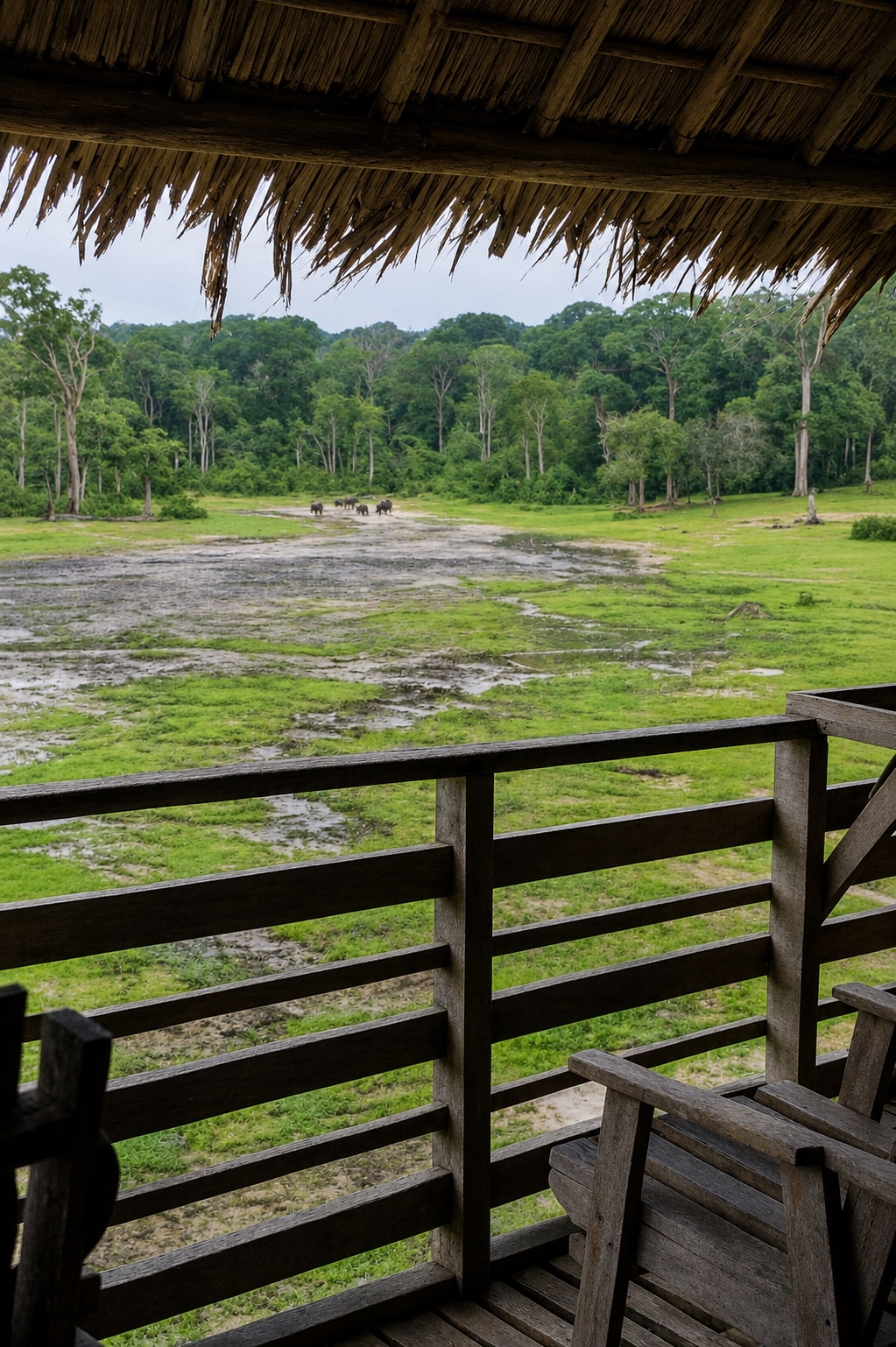
Observation platform overlooking Dzanga Bai, from which Andrea Turkalo has conducted long-term observations of African forest elephants since 1990.

Turkalo began her study of forest elephants at Dzanga Bai in 1990. The large forest clearing, or bai, attracts elephants from across the surrounding rainforest to feed on mineral-rich soils and vegetation, allowing researchers to observe animals that are otherwise difficult to study in dense tropical forest.

Working from an observation platform overlooking the bai, Turkalo developed a system for recognising individual elephants from distinctive physical characteristics, including ear tears, tusk shape and body scars. Over time, this enabled the recognition of successive generations of elephants and the compilation of detailed life histories for hundreds of individuals.

Through daily observations spanning more than three decades, Turkalo and her colleagues assembled one of the world's most comprehensive long-term datasets on African forest elephants. The study has provided valuable information on social relationships, reproduction, calf survival, longevity, population dynamics and the use of forest clearings by elephants.

== Scientific contributions ==
Turkalo's long-term research has contributed substantially to scientific understanding of the African forest elephant, a species that was previously far less studied than the African bush elephant. By following individually identified elephants over multiple decades, she and her collaborators have produced detailed information on the species' demography, life history, reproductive biology and social organisation.

Her research has shown that forest elephants reproduce more slowly, mature later and have longer generation times than previously assumed, making populations particularly vulnerable to poaching and other sources of mortality.

The long-term dataset developed at Dzanga Bai has also provided insights into elephant movements, family relationships, dominance hierarchies and the use of forest clearings. The dataset has been widely used in studies of forest elephant ecology and conservation.

== Conservation work ==
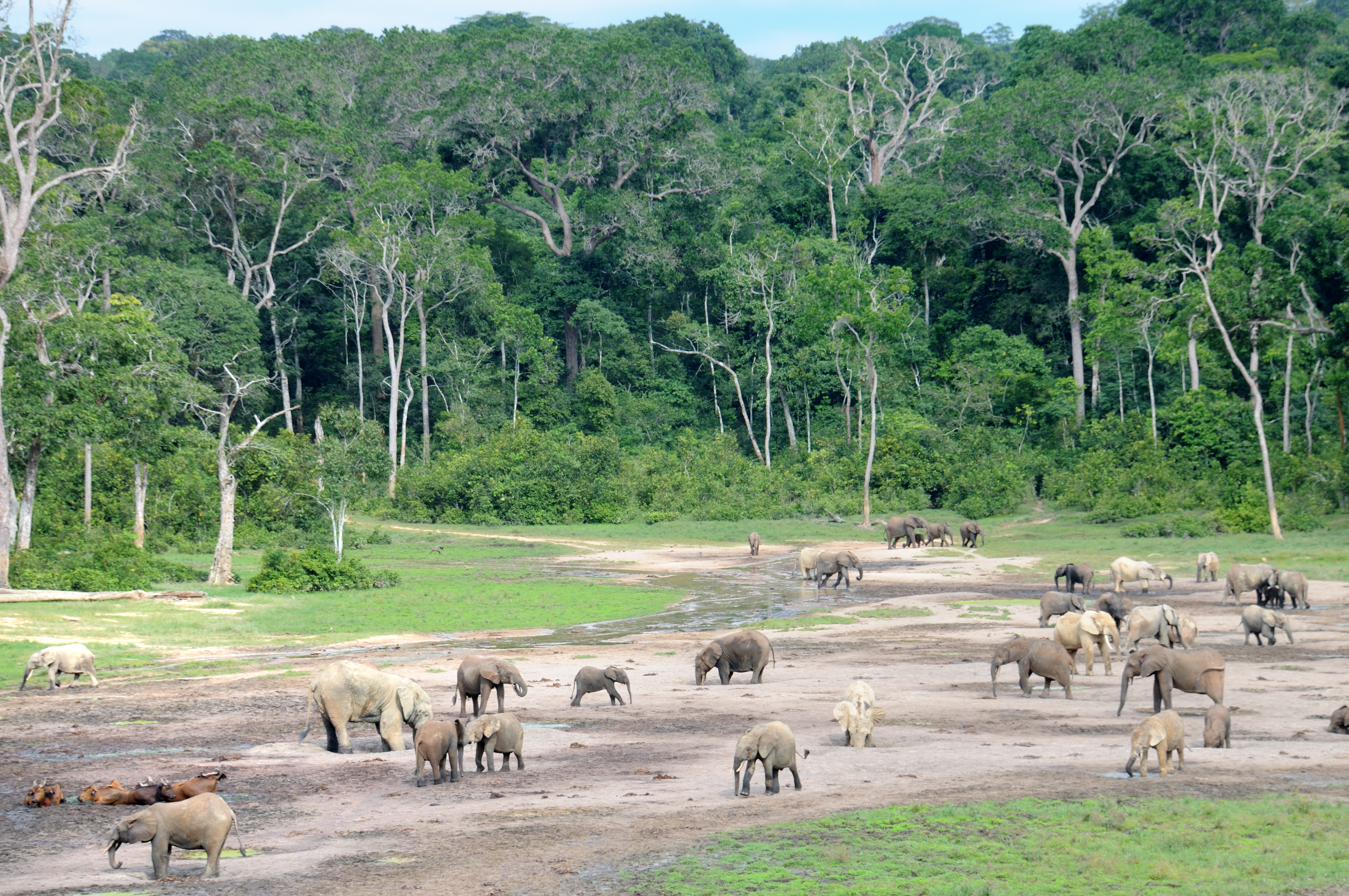
African forest elephants at Dzanga Bai, where Turkalo has monitored individually identified elephants since 1990.

In addition to her scientific research, Turkalo has played an active role in the conservation of African forest elephants in the Dzanga-Sangha landscape. Her long-term monitoring has documented the effects of poaching on elephant populations and has provided baseline data used to assess population trends and conservation status.

In March 2013, during the Central African Republic Civil War, armed poachers entered Dzanga Bai and killed at least 26 elephants in one of the deadliest recorded poaching incidents at the site. As armed groups advanced into the region, Turkalo fled across the Sangha River into Cameroon, taking with her hard drives containing more than two decades of research data.

After security conditions improved, Turkalo returned to Dzanga-Sangha and resumed her long-term observations at Dzanga Bai. Her work has continued to support both scientific research and conservation management in one of Central Africa's most important protected areas for forest elephants.

== Selected publications ==
- Turkalo, Andrea K.; Wrege, Peter H.; Wittemyer, George (2013). "Long-Term Monitoring of Dzanga Bai Forest Elephants: Forest Clearing Use Patterns". PLOS ONE. 8 (12). e85154. doi:10.1371/journal.pone.0085154. PMC 3873458.
- Turkalo, Andrea K.; Wrege, Peter H.; Wittemyer, George (2018). "Long-term monitoring of Dzanga Bai forest elephants provides new insights into forest elephant demography and life history". PLOS ONE. 13 (2). e0192777. doi:10.1371/journal.pone.0192777. PMC 5813957.
