= Kounda-Papaye =

- Location in Central African Republic
- Coordinates: 3°5′38″N 16°13′15″E
- Country: Central African Republic
- Prefecture: Sangha-Mbaéré
- Sub-prefecture: Bayanga
- Commune: Yobe-Sangha
- Established: 1991

Population (2021)
  - Total: 291

Kounda-Papaye is a village located within Dzanga-Sangha Special Reserve in Sangha-Mbaéré Prefecture, Central African Republic.

== Name ==
The village was named Kounda-Papaye because of the abundance of papaya trees in the village.

== History ==
Kounda-Papaye was founded in 1991 by people from the nearby settlements, such as Yobe and Bayanga, who wanted to have their land.

== Demographics ==
Baka, Mbiemou, Bogongo, Gbaya, Goudi, and Banjourn are ethnic groups who inhabit Kounda-Papaye.

== Economy ==
The residents depend on several economic sectors, such as hunting, agriculture, gathering, fishing, and diamond mining.

== Education ==
The village has one elementary school.
