= Dzanga-Sangha Complex of Protected Areas =

Nature reserve in the Central African Republic

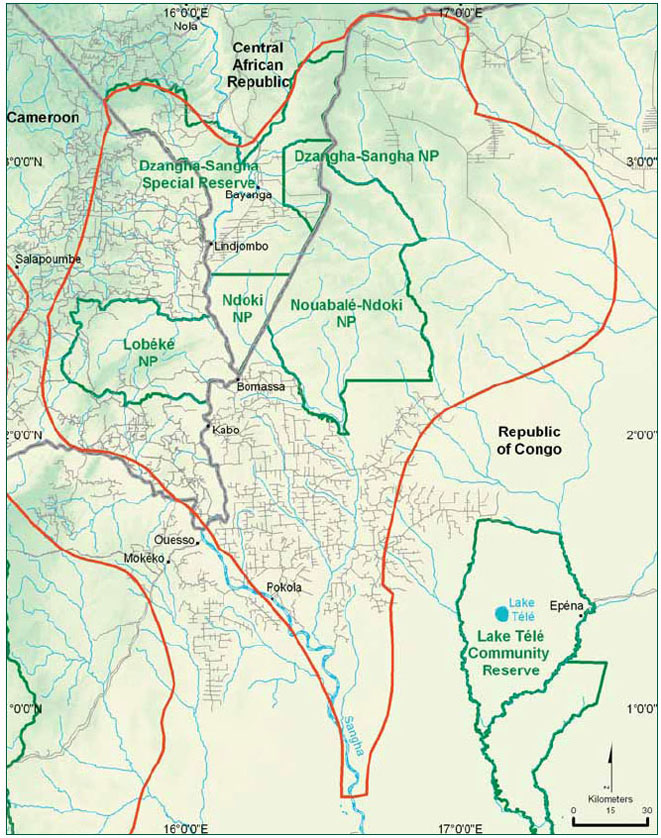
The Sangha Tri National Landscape. The Dzanga-Sangha Complex of Protected Areas is located within the triangular southwestern tip of the Central African Republic.

The Dzanga-Sangha Complex of Protected Areas (DSPAC) (originally: Dzanga-Sangha Project) is a protected area in the extreme southwestern Central African Republic. The dense forest block, created in 1990, measures 4,589 km^{2} (1,772 sq mi). It consists of the Dzanga-Sangha Special Reserve and the Dzanga Ndoki National Park which has two sectors, the 495 km (308 mi) Dzanga Park and the 725 km (450 mi) Ndoki Park. Since their gazetting, management of the park and the reserve has been under the Dzanga-Sangha project, a collaborative effort of the country's government, the GTZ/LUSO, a German technical agency, and the World Wildlife Fund. Financial and technical assistance have been provided by the German and United States governments, the World Bank, and several private organizations and donors.

== Geography and climate ==
The Dzanga-Sangha Complex of Protected Areas is located in the extreme southwest of the Central African Republic in a triangular-shaped part of the country. The Dzanga-Sangha rainforest is the second largest on earth, covering over 6.919 million acres (28,000 km^{2}) of moist tropical forest. The main river running through this region is the Sangha River. The precise border between the Central African Republic, Cameroon and the Republic of Congo is located at 2°13′14″N 16°11′31″E (in the Sangha River). Ndoki Park is located furthest south in the lowest triangular-shaped part and forms the border among these countries.

The average annual rainfall is 1,400–1,500 millimetres (4.6–4.9 ft) and the average temperature is between 24 and 29 °C. The most precipitation in the area falls in the long rainy season from October to November, and in the short rainy season between May and June.

== Flora and fauna ==
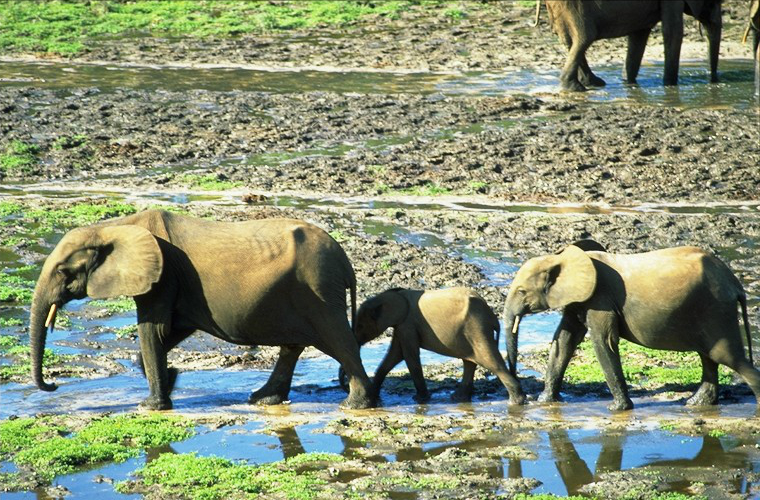
Forest elephants

Predominant vegetation consists of semi-deciduous, evergreen, flooded, swampy forests. Monodominant forests also exist of Gilbetiodendron dewevrei. The most important observed species include the Euphorbiaceae, Rubiaceae, Fabaceae, and Annonaceae. Others that are well represented include the Caeasalpiniaceae, Meliaceae, Sterculiaceae and Ebenaceae. Near villages can be found patches of savannah as well as forest exploitation roads. The DSPAC forests around the Sangha River are differentiated in their composition and structure. They are characterised by the presence of monodominant patches of Gilbertiodendron dewevrei stands, with relatively low values for the mean number of trees per hectare when compared with other areas of the region. Conversely, field observations find that these forests display some of the highest concentrations of animal species per hectare as compared with other areas of the region.

The varied ecosystems are a habitat source for very high concentrations of African forest elephant, gorilla, chimpanzee, bongo, and Cape buffalo.

== Protection ==
Within the DSCPA, subsistence hunting is allowed in the special reserve, but all forms of exploitation, except tourism and scientific research, are prohibited in the national park. Commercial timber exploitation occurred in the DSCPA in the 1970s and 1980s.
