= Turkalo =

Turkalo (Ukrainian: Туркало) is a surname of Ukrainian origin derived from a nickname which means "boring, nagging person", from the verb "туркати". Notable people with the surname include:

- Andrea Turkalo, American conservation biologist
- Natalya Turkalo (born 1982), Ukrainian handball player
