= Kadéï River =

River in Cameroon

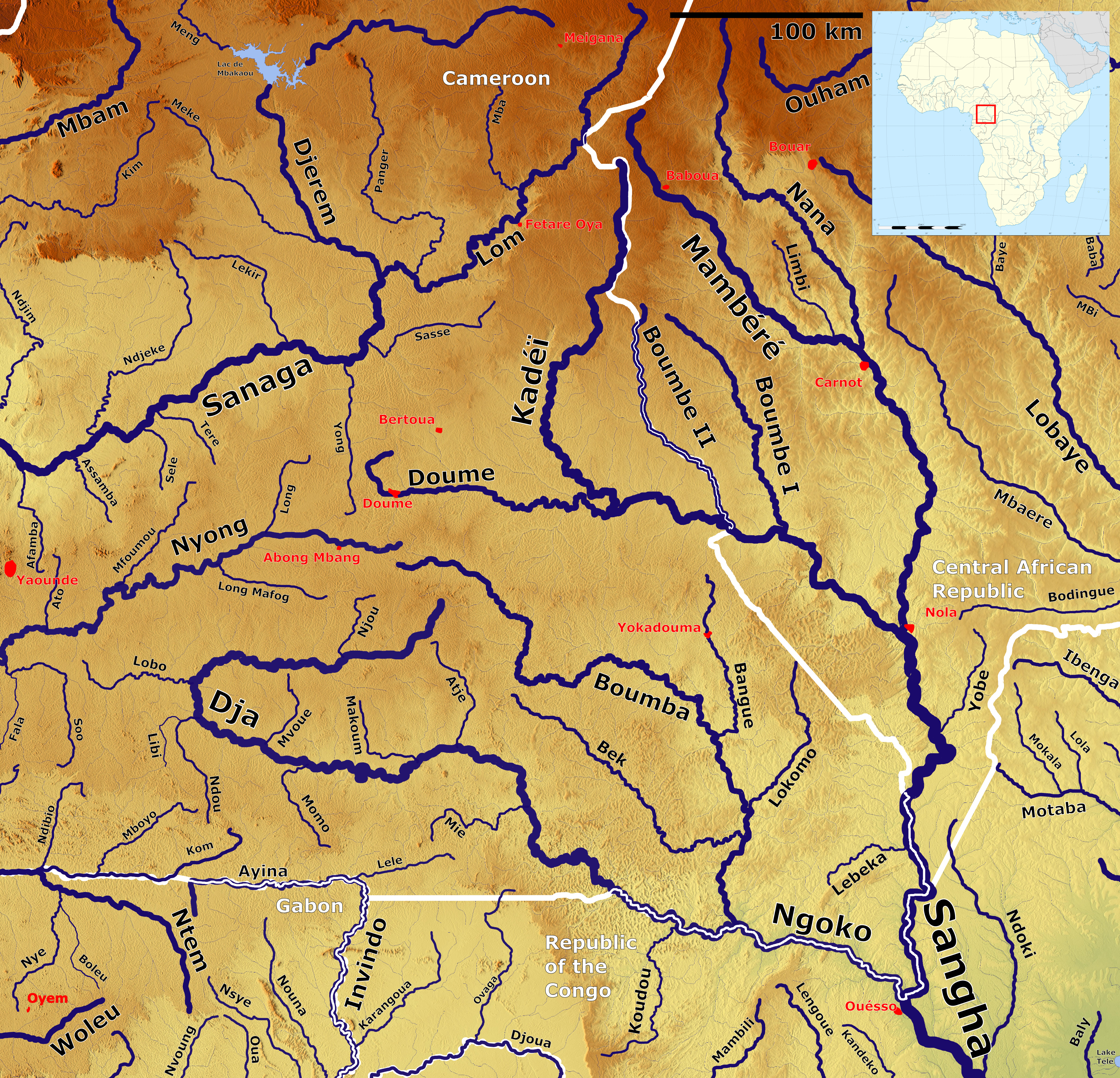
Sangha River basin

The Kadéï River is a tributary of the Sangha River that flows through Cameroon and the Central African Republic. Its total drainage basin is 24,000 km^{2}. The river rises from the eastern Adamawa Plateau, southeast of Garoua-Boulaï (5°53′50″N 14°33′30″E) in Cameroon's East Province. The Kadéï is swelled by two tributaries, the Doumé at Mindourou (4°7′45″N 14°34′22″E) and the Boumbé (4°6′45″N 15°7′10″E), before reaching Cameroon–Central African Republic border, following the border for 12 km, and then flowing east into the Central African Republic. At Nola (3°31′10″N 16°2′35″E), the Kadéï meets the Mambéré and becomes the Sangha. The Kadéï is part of the Congo River basin.

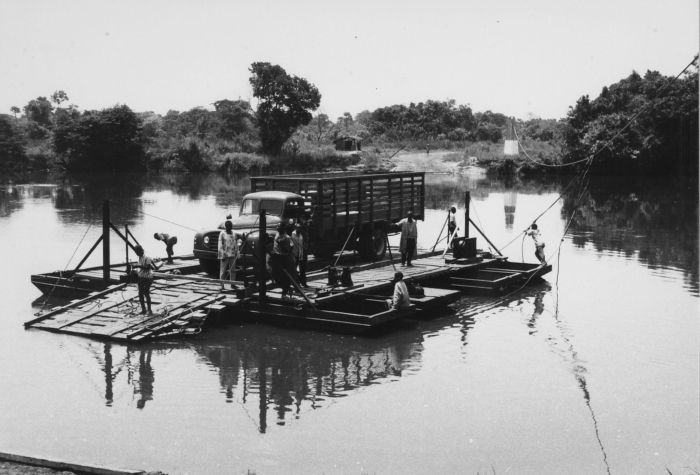
Ferry crossing in 1965

== See also ==
- Communes of Cameroon
