= Dzanga-Ndoki National Park =

National park in the Central African Republic

- IUCN category II (national park)
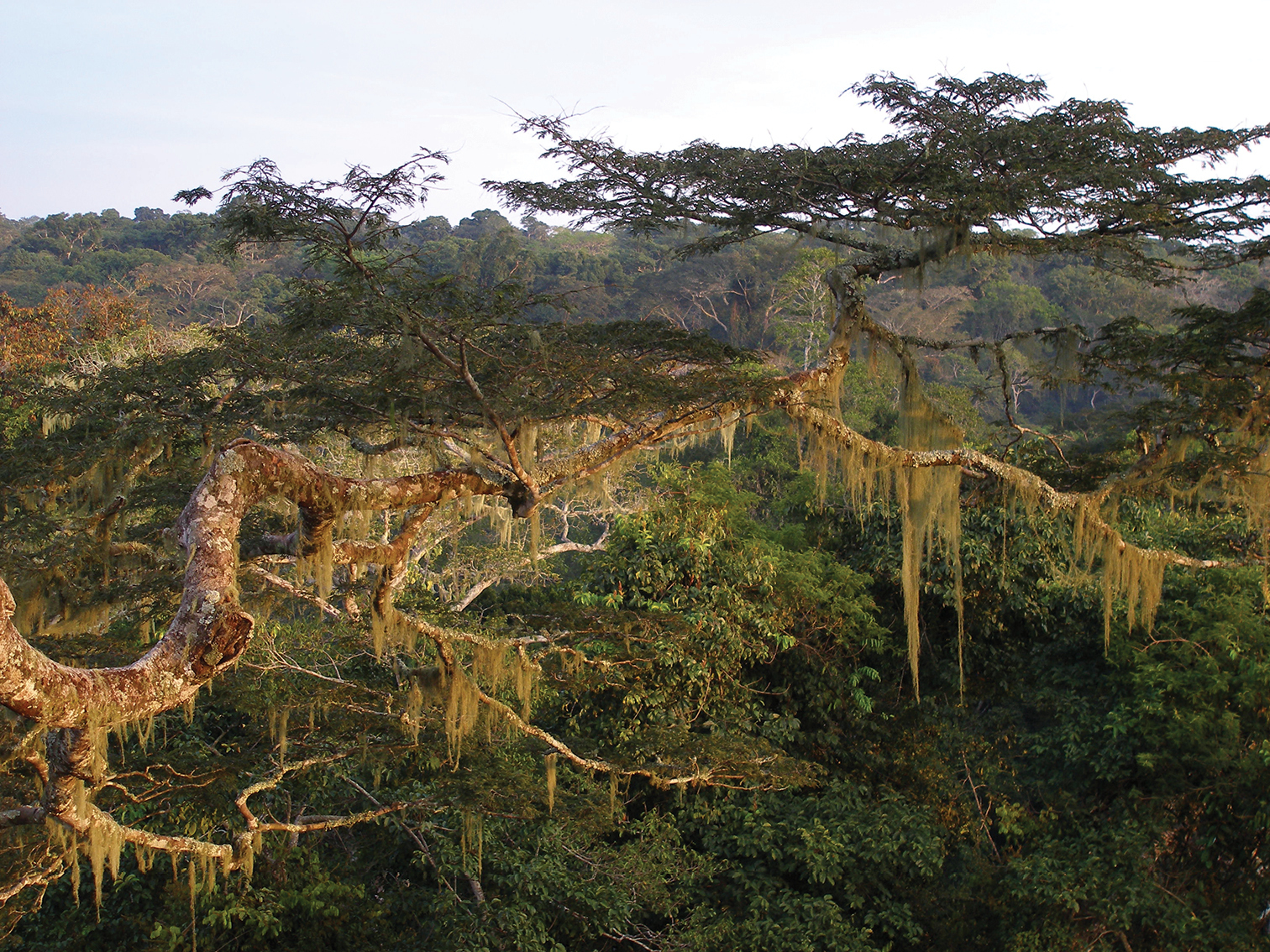
- Forest canopy

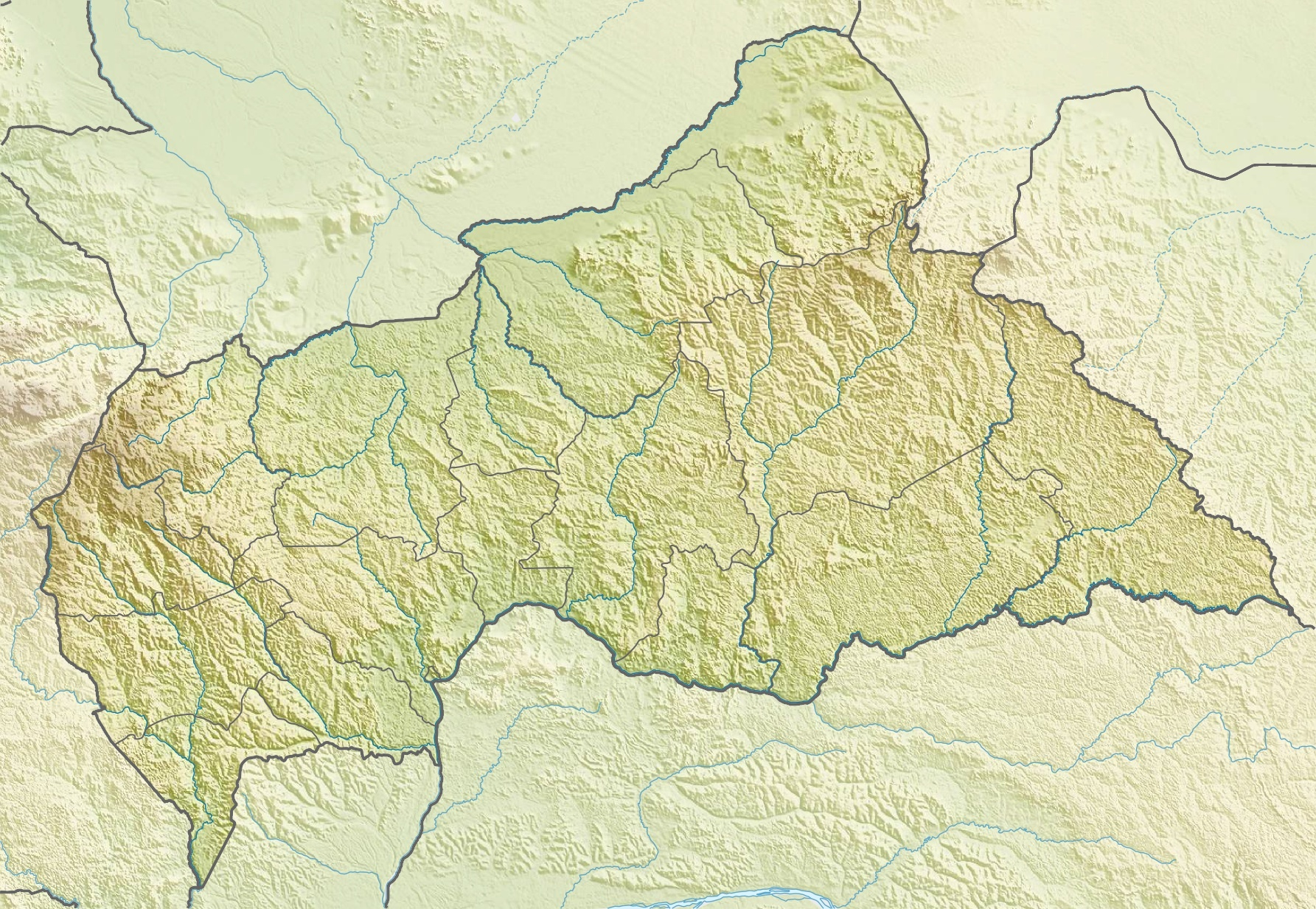
- Location within Central African Republic
- Location: Central African Republic
- Nearest city: Nola
- Coordinates: 2°30′N 16°10′E
- Area: 1,143.26 km^{2} (441.42 sq mi)
- Established: 1990

The Dzanga-Ndoki National Park is located in the southwestern extremity of the Central African Republic. Established in 1990, the national park is 1,143.26 square kilometres (441.42 sq mi). The national park is split into two non-continuous sectors, the northern Dzanga sector (or Dzanga Park) 49,500 ha (122,000 acres) and the southern Ndoki sector (or Ndoki Park) 72,500 ha (179,000 acres). Notable in the Dzanga sector is a gorilla density of 1.6/km^{2} (4.1/sq mi), one of the highest densities ever reported for the western lowland gorilla.

Between the two sectors of the national park stretches the Dzanga-Sangha Special Reserve 3,359 km^{2} (1,297 mi^{2}). The national park and the special reserve, each with its own protective status, are a part of the Dzanga-Sangha Complex of Protected Areas (DSPAC).

Along with the adjacent Nouabalé-Ndoki National Park in Republic of the Congo and Lobéké National Park in Cameroon, Dzanga-Ndoki National Park forms the Sangha Trinational protected area, which was awarded World Heritage Site-status in 2012

The park is internationally recognised for its populations of western lowland gorillas and African forest elephants, as well as the nearby Dzanga Bai, one of Central Africa's most important wildlife viewing sites.

== Geography ==
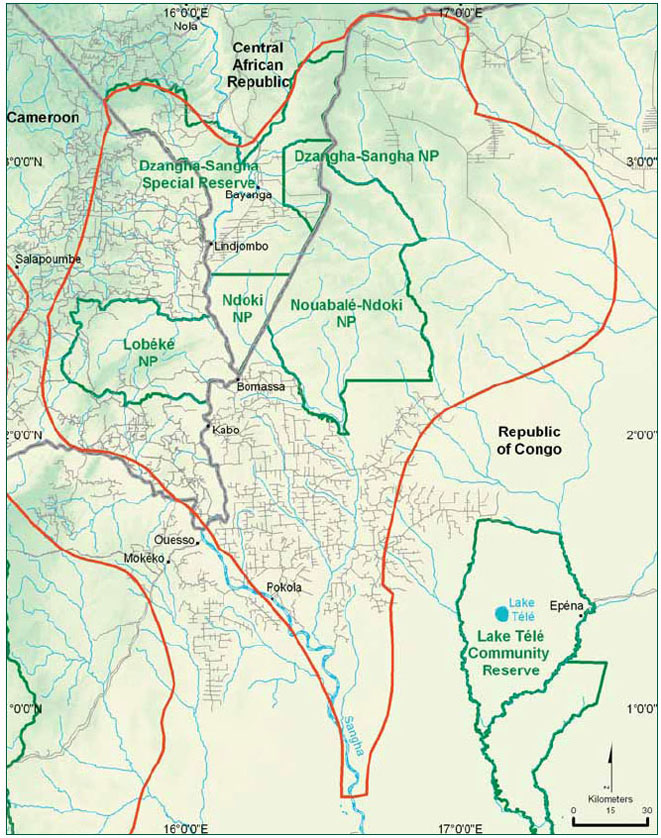
The Sangha Tri National Landscape. Dzanga-Ndoki National Park is the triangular part.

The Dzanga-Sangha National Park is located in the extreme southwest of the Central African Republic in a triangular-shaped part of the country. The main river running through this region is the Sangha River. The precise border between the Central African Republic, Cameroon and the Republic of the Congo is located at 2°13′14″N 16°11′31″E (in the Sangha River), marking the furthest point of the park to the southwest.

The park's altitude ranges from 340 to 615 m (1,115 to 2,018 ft) above sea level. The whole park is on alluvial sands. Along streams, forest clearings can be found with marshy depressions referred to as 'bai'. The Dzanga Bai (translation: "the village of elephants") is a sandy salt lick that measures 250 by 500 m (820 by 1,640 ft). It is traversed through the middle by the Dzanga, a stream. Since 1997, Bai Hokou has the base site of the Primate Habituation Programme where gorilla habituation for tourism has been ongoing, along with research.

Logging occurred in the 1980s in the Dzanga sector but not in the Ndoki which is primary forest. Amis Kamiss wrote in 2006 of having visited fifteen diamond mining sites in the Lobé River region, located in the northwestern part of the national park.

== Flora and fauna ==
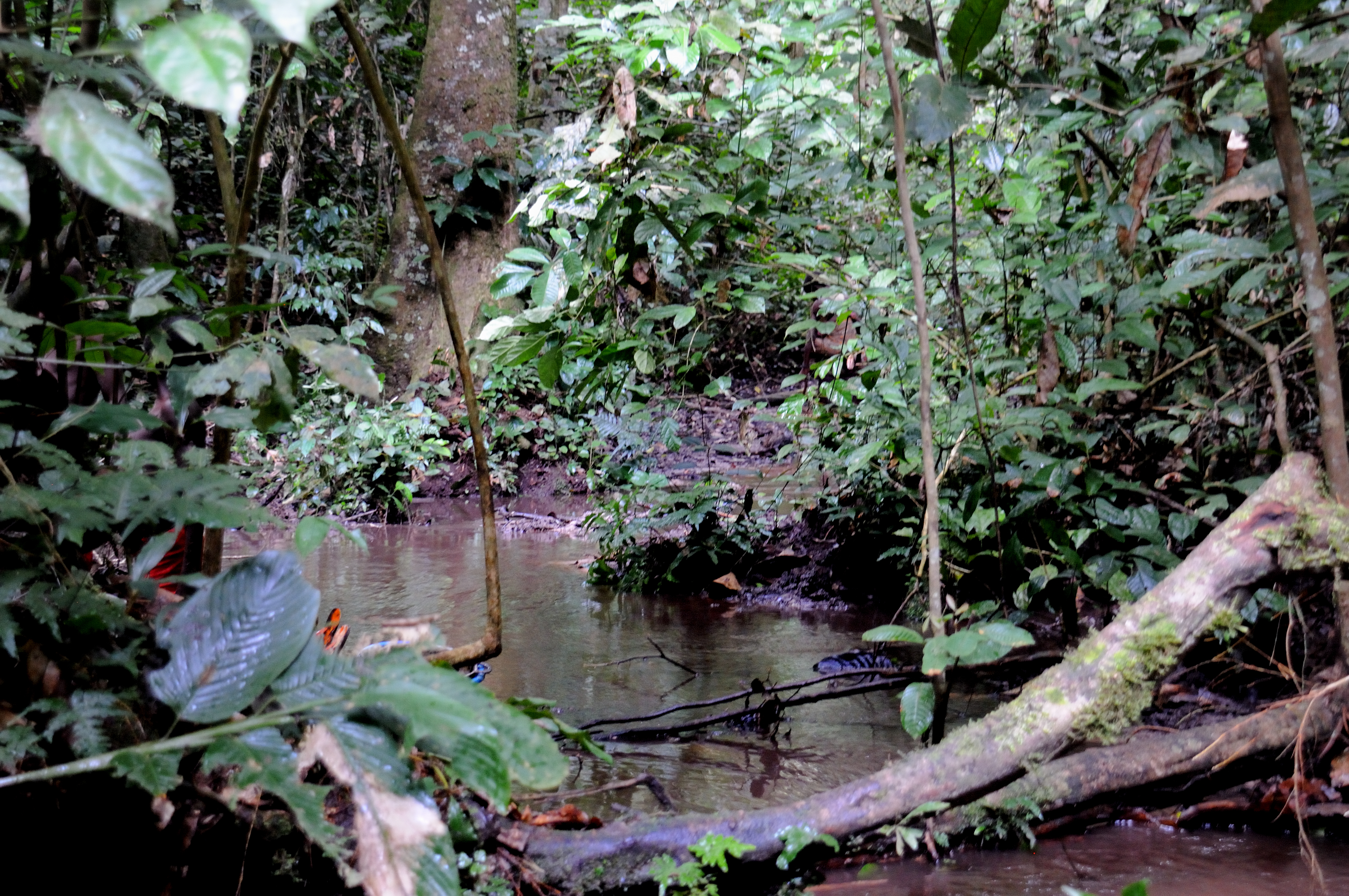
Forest stream in Dzanga-Ndoki National Park, part of the Congo Basin rainforest.

There are three types of forest within Dzanga-Ndoki National Park: mainly dryland, a semi-evergreen forest that contains swamp-forest areas along the rivers and, a closed-canopy, monodominant Gilbertiodendron dewevrei forest. The dryland forest is an open, mixed canopy that is dominated by Sterculiaceae and Ulmaceae; often associated with it is a dense understorey of Marantaceae and Zingiberaceae. Along the Sangha River, there are stands of Guibourtia demeusii.

There are several intact populations of key forest fauna including the western lowland gorilla, African forest elephant, chimpanzee, giant forest hog, red river hog, sitatunga, endangered bongo, African forest buffalo, and six species of duiker. The gorilla density of 1.6 individuals/km^{2} within the Dzanga sector is one of the highest densities ever reported for the western lowland gorilla.

The Dzanga-Ndoki National Park has been designated an Important Bird Area (#CF008). The IBA is contiguous with two other IBAs, Lobéké of Cameroon (#CM033) and Nouabalé-Ndoki in the Republic of the Congo (#CG001). Over 350 bird species have been reported at the national park of which at least 260 can be expected to breed. Stiphrornis sanghensis has been described as a new species noted only within Dzanga-Sangha, but further investigation is pending as it may also occur in adjacent parts of Cameroon, the Republic of the Congo and the Democratic Republic of the Congo.

In May 2013, the slaughtering of 26 African forest elephants by poachers in Dzanga Bai, a reserve in the World Heritage Site Sangha Trinational led to worldwide concern by conservationists.

== Conservation ==
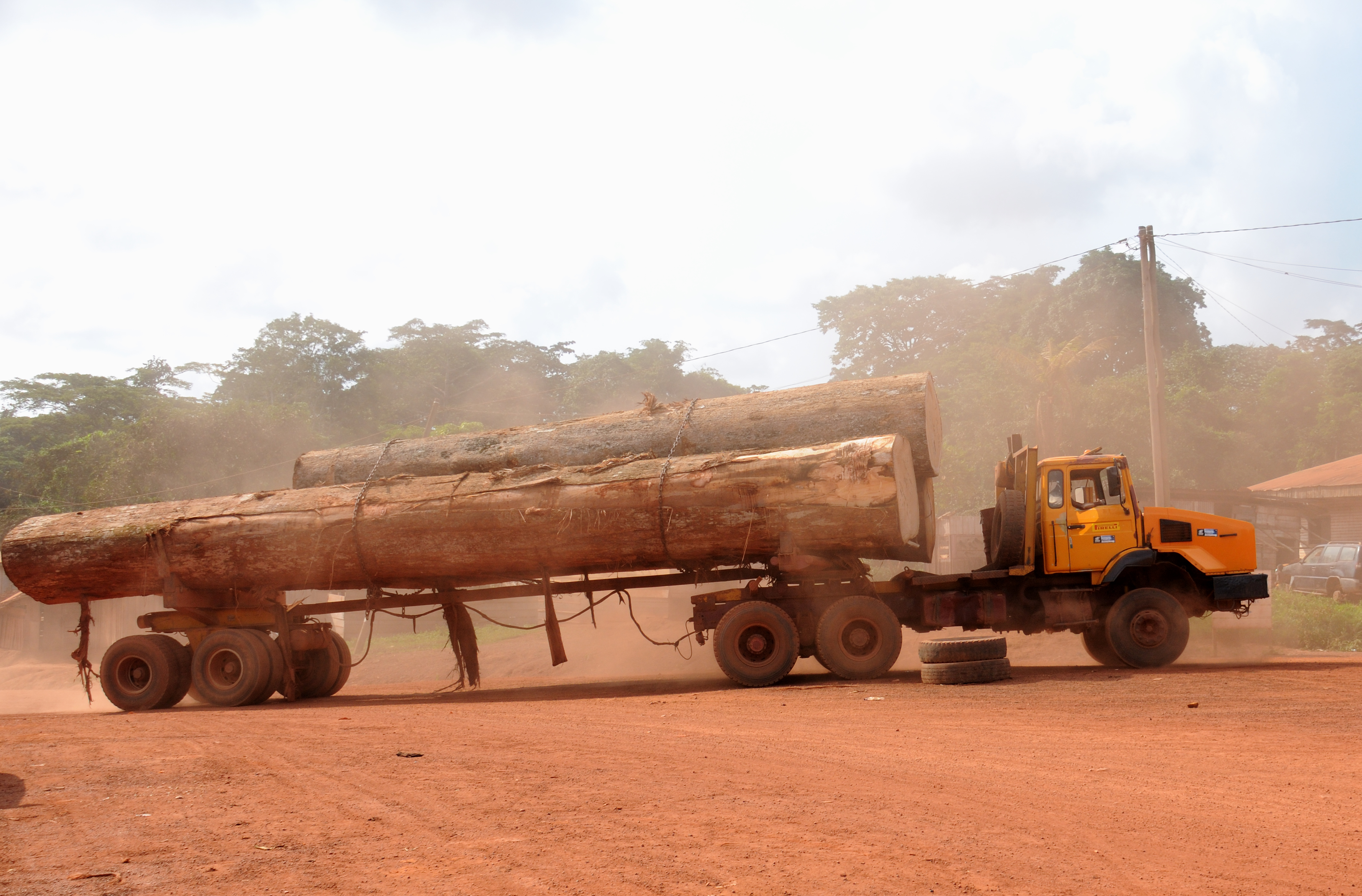
Logging truck transporting timber near Libongo, Cameroon. Managed logging concessions surround much of the protected Sangha Trinational landscape.

Dzanga-Ndoki National Park is managed as part of the Dzanga-Sangha Protected Areas (DSPA), a protected area complex administered by the government of the Central African Republic with support from the World Wide Fund for Nature (WWF). Management activities include wildlife monitoring, anti-poaching patrols, ecological research and programmes involving local communities.

Since 2000, the park has also been part of the Sangha Trinational, a transboundary conservation initiative linking Dzanga-Ndoki with Lobéké National Park in Cameroon and Nouabalé-Ndoki National Park in the Republic of the Congo. The three parks cooperate on wildlife protection, scientific research and the management of a continuous tropical forest ecosystem that extends across national borders.

Despite its protected status, the park continues to face pressure from elephant poaching and from logging and mining activities in surrounding areas. Outside the park boundaries, the landscape is managed as a mosaic of protected forests, logging concessions and community hunting zones. This zoning approach aims to balance biodiversity conservation with the sustainable use of natural resources while maintaining ecological connectivity across the wider Sangha landscape.

== See also ==
- Dzanga Bai
- Dzanga-Sangha Special Reserve
- Sangha Trinational
- Sangha River
- Bayanga
