= Michael Fay =

Michael Fay may refer to:

- Sir Michael Fay (banker) (born 1949), New Zealand merchant banker in the America Cup's Hall of Fame
- J. Michael Fay (born 1956), American ecologist and conservationist
- Michael D. Fay, American war artist
- Michael Francis Fay (born 1960), British botanist
- Michael Fay, American caned in Singapore in 1994 for vandalism
