= Dzanga Bai =

Forest clearing in the Dzanga-Sangha Special Reserve, Central African Republic

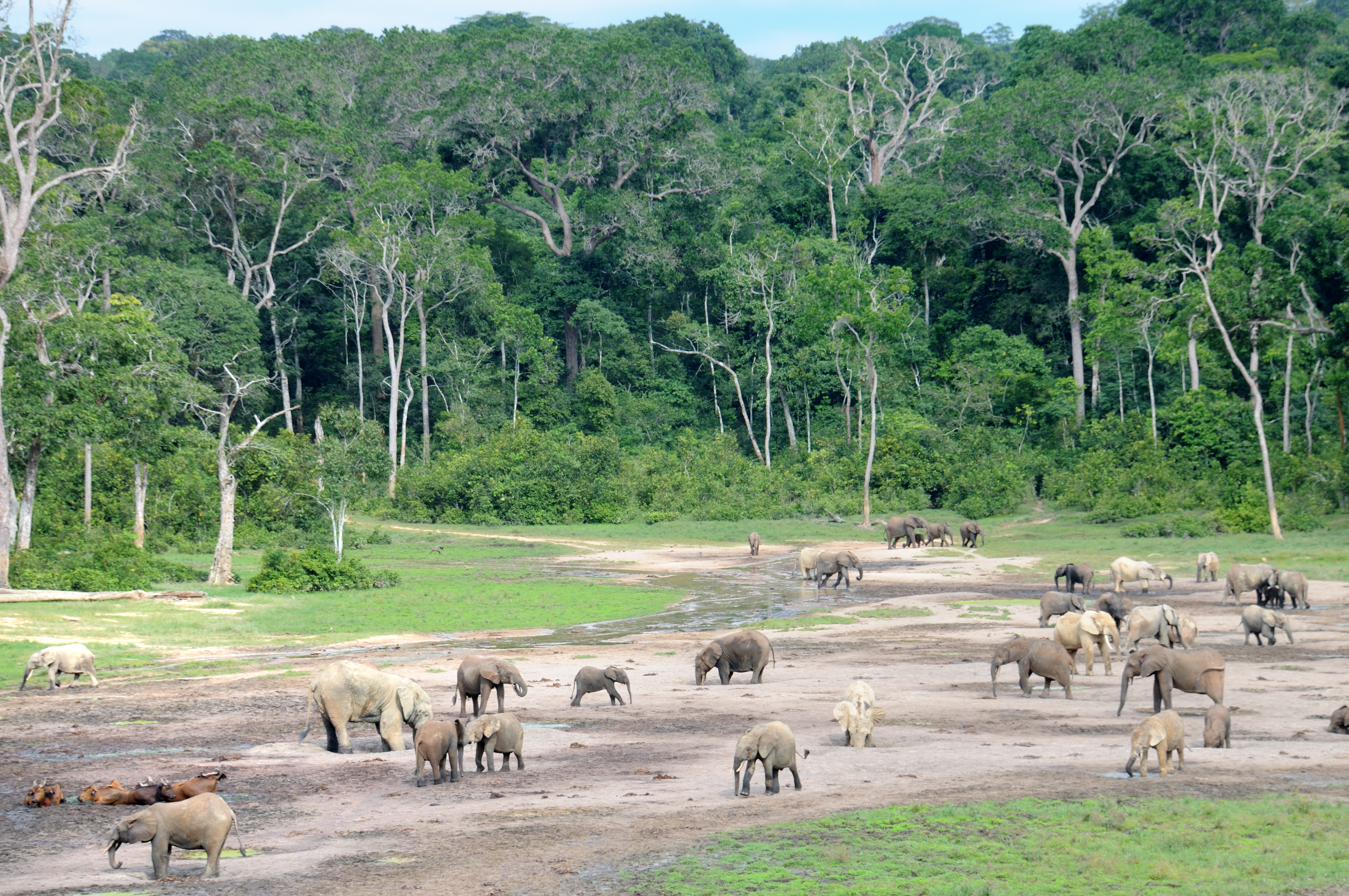
- General view of Dzanga Bai with African forest elephants.

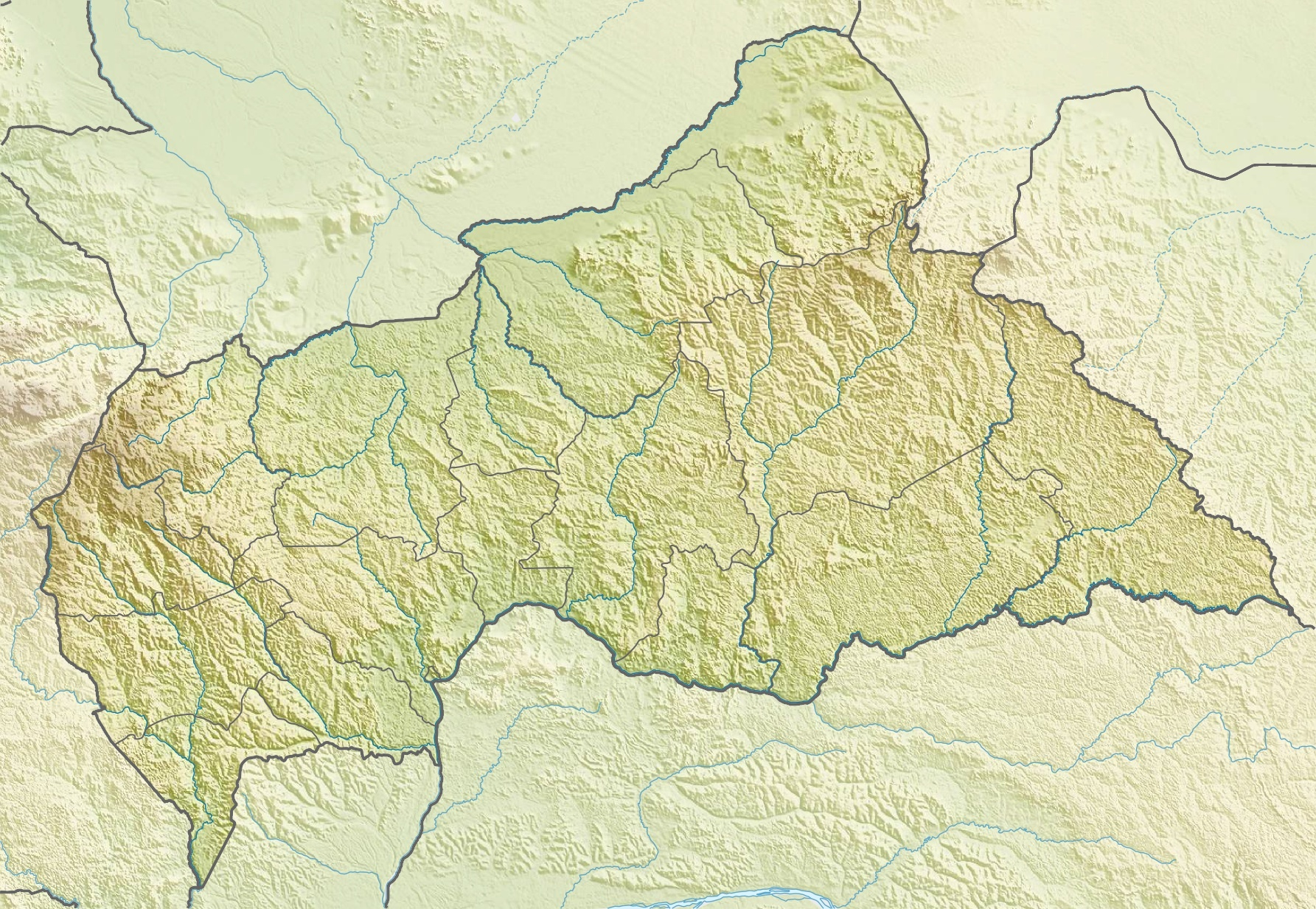
- Location within Central African Republic
- Location: Dzanga-Sangha Special Reserve; Central African Republic
- Nearest city: Bayanga
- Coordinates: 2°57′14″N 16°21′54″E
- Area: 10 ha (25 acres)

Dzanga Bai is a natural forest clearing (known locally as a bai) within the Dzanga-Sangha Special Reserve in the south-western Central African Republic. Located in the Congo Basin rainforest, it is one of several mineral-rich forest clearings that attract large mammals from the surrounding forest. The clearing is regularly visited by African forest elephants (Loxodonta cyclotis), which gather to feed on mineral-rich soils and vegetation. Other species commonly recorded at the bai include African buffalo, sitatungas, bongos, western lowland gorillas and numerous bird species.

Since 1990, Dzanga Bai has been the site of a long-term research program led by the Wildlife Conservation Society (WCS). Among the researchers who have worked at Dzanga Bai is conservation biologist Andrea Turkalo, who has studied the elephants of Dzanga Bai for more than three decades. By identifying individual elephants from the shape of their ears, tusks and other physical characteristics, researchers have documented their behaviour, social organisation, reproduction and population dynamics. Dzanga Bai is one of the principal ecotourism destinations within the Dzanga-Sangha Protected Areas. Visitors observe wildlife from an elevated viewing platform overlooking the clearing.

== Description ==
African forest elephants gathering at Dzanga Bai

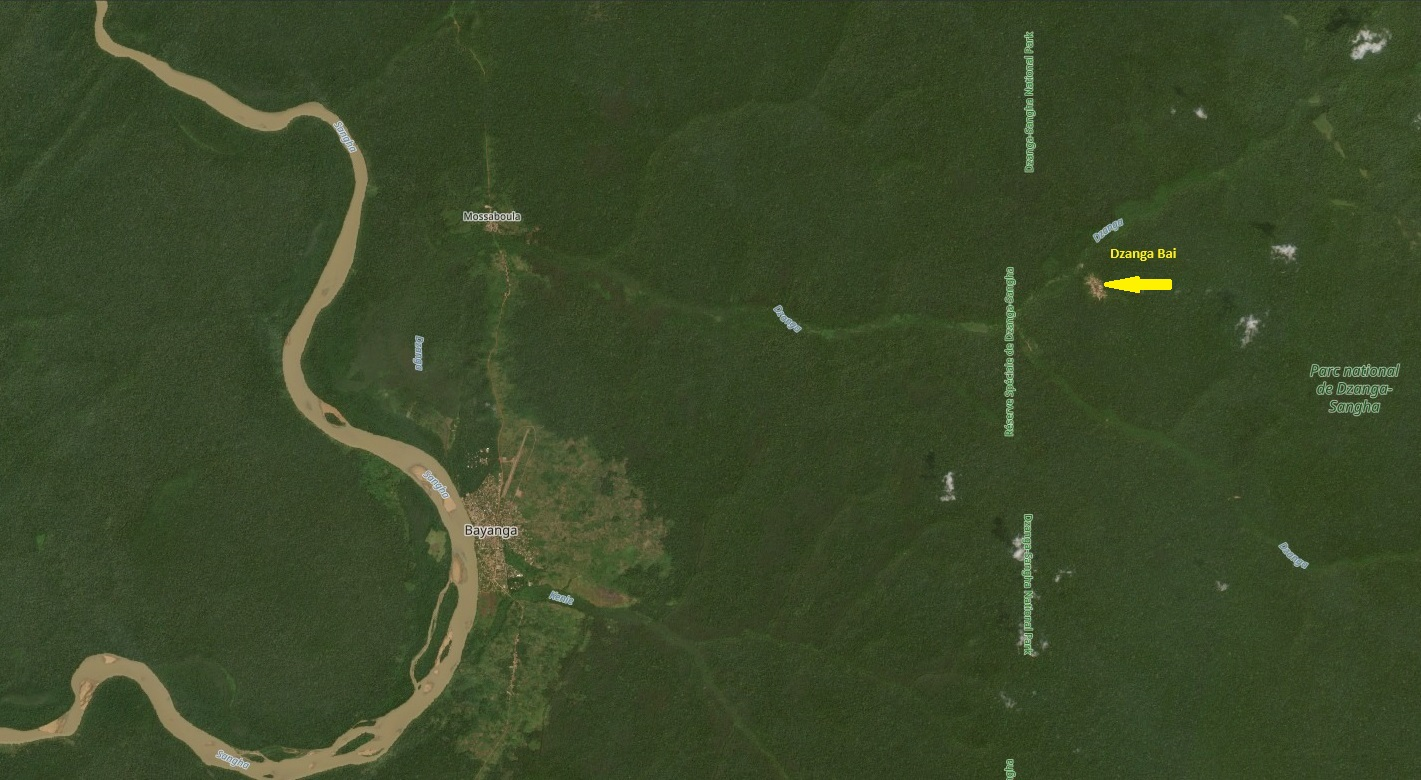
Annotated Sentinel-2 satellite image showing the location of Dzanga Bai and Bayanga within the Dzanga-Sangha Special Reserve, Central African Republic.

Dzanga Bai is located in the south-western Central African Republic, within the Dzanga-Sangha Special Reserve, close to the borders with the Republic of the Congo and Cameroon. The forest clearing lies approximately 12 km north-east of Bayanga, the main access point for visitors and researchers travelling to the bai. One of many forest clearings within the Sangha River basin, part of the Congo Basin rainforest, formed by local geological and hydrological conditions that create open areas, the bai occupies a shallow natural depression surrounded by tropical rainforest and crossed by seasonal streams. Mineral-rich groundwater and permanently waterlogged soils inhibit the growth of closed-canopy forest, allowing the clearing to remain open. The open character of the bai is also maintained by the repeated use of the clearing by elephants and other large mammals.

Although Dzanga Bai has long been used by forest elephants and other wildlife, it only became known to the international scientific community in the late twentieth century. Following the establishment of the Dzanga-Sangha Special Reserve in 1990, the clearing was selected as a long-term field site because its open habitat allowed researchers to observe African forest elephants directly, something rarely possible in the surrounding rainforest. Research at Dzanga Bai began in 1990 under the Wildlife Conservation Society (WCS), with Andrea Turkalo among the first researchers to undertake continuous field observations. Over the following decades, Dzanga Bai became an important long-term research site for African forest elephants. Since 2012, Dzanga Bai has formed part of the Sangha Trinational, a UNESCO World Heritage Site shared by the Central African Republic, Cameroon and the Republic of the Congo.

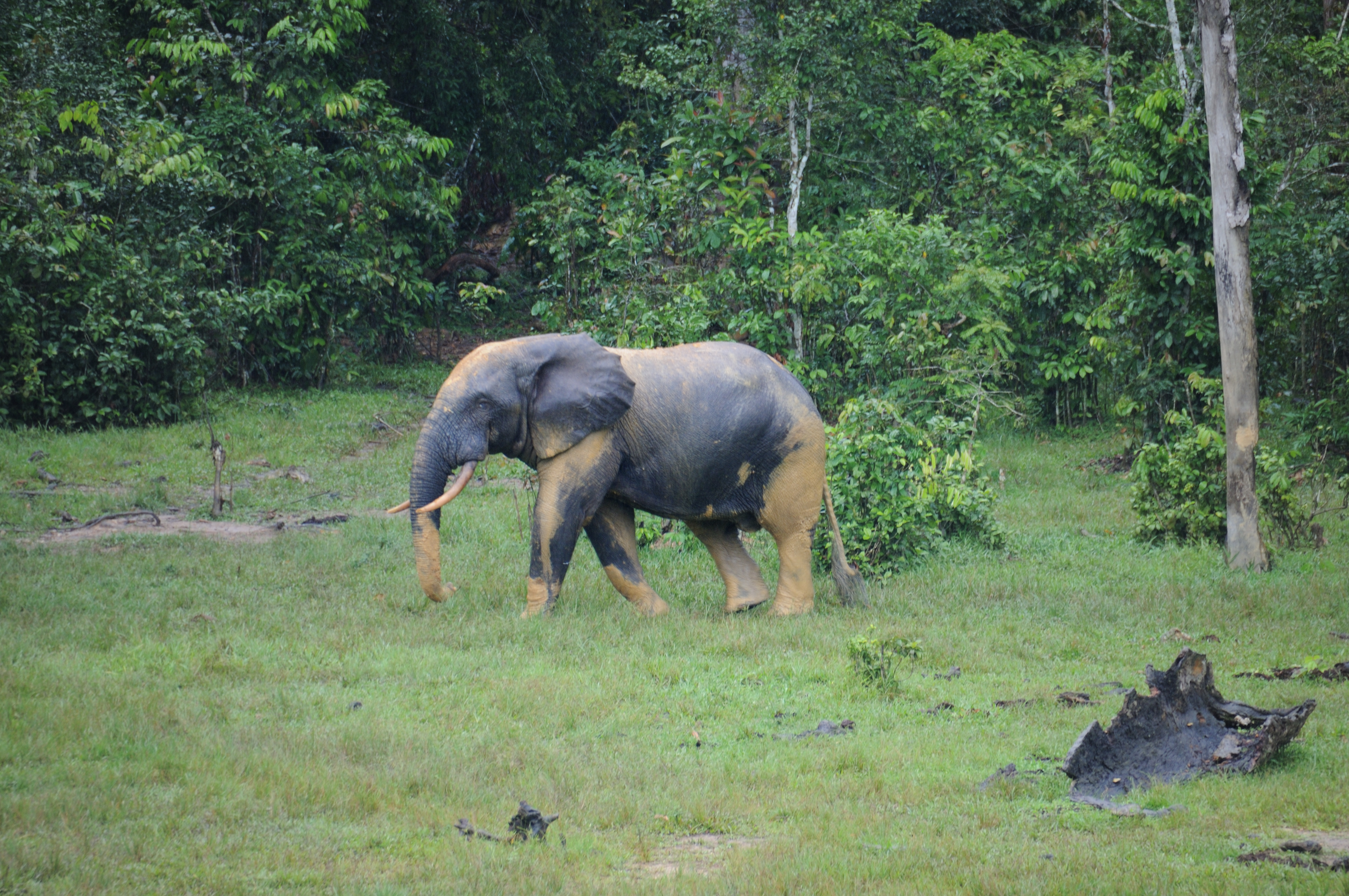
African forest elephants covered in mineral-rich mud at Dzanga Bai

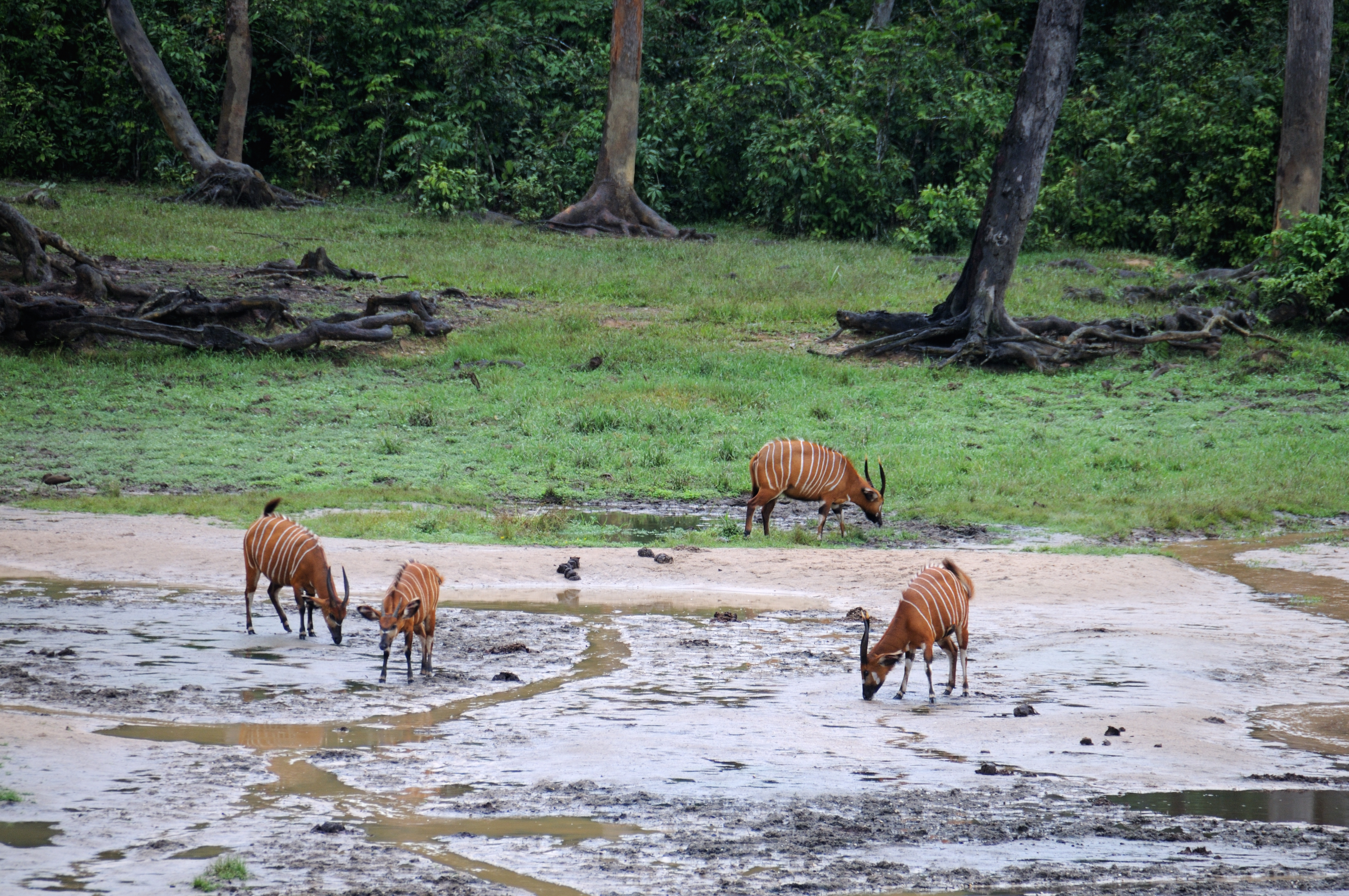
Sitatungas (Tragelaphus spekii), a semi-aquatic antelope adapted to swampy habitats, photographed at Dzanga Bai

African forest elephants (Loxodonta cyclotis) are the most characteristic species of Dzanga Bai and are present throughout the year. The mineral-rich soils, groundwater and vegetation attract elephants throughout the year, where they feed, drink and consume soil containing sodium and other minerals. Because forest elephants spend much of their lives beneath the rainforest canopy. At certain times, several dozen elephants can be present simultaneously. The bai is also used by several other large mammals, including African forest buffalo (Syncerus caffer nanus), bongos (Tragelaphus eurycerus), sitatungas (Tragelaphus spekii), red river hogs (Potamochoerus porcus) and western lowland gorillas (Gorilla gorilla gorilla). Many bird species also frequent the clearing.

== Scientific research ==
African forest elephants feeding and moving across Dzanga Bai

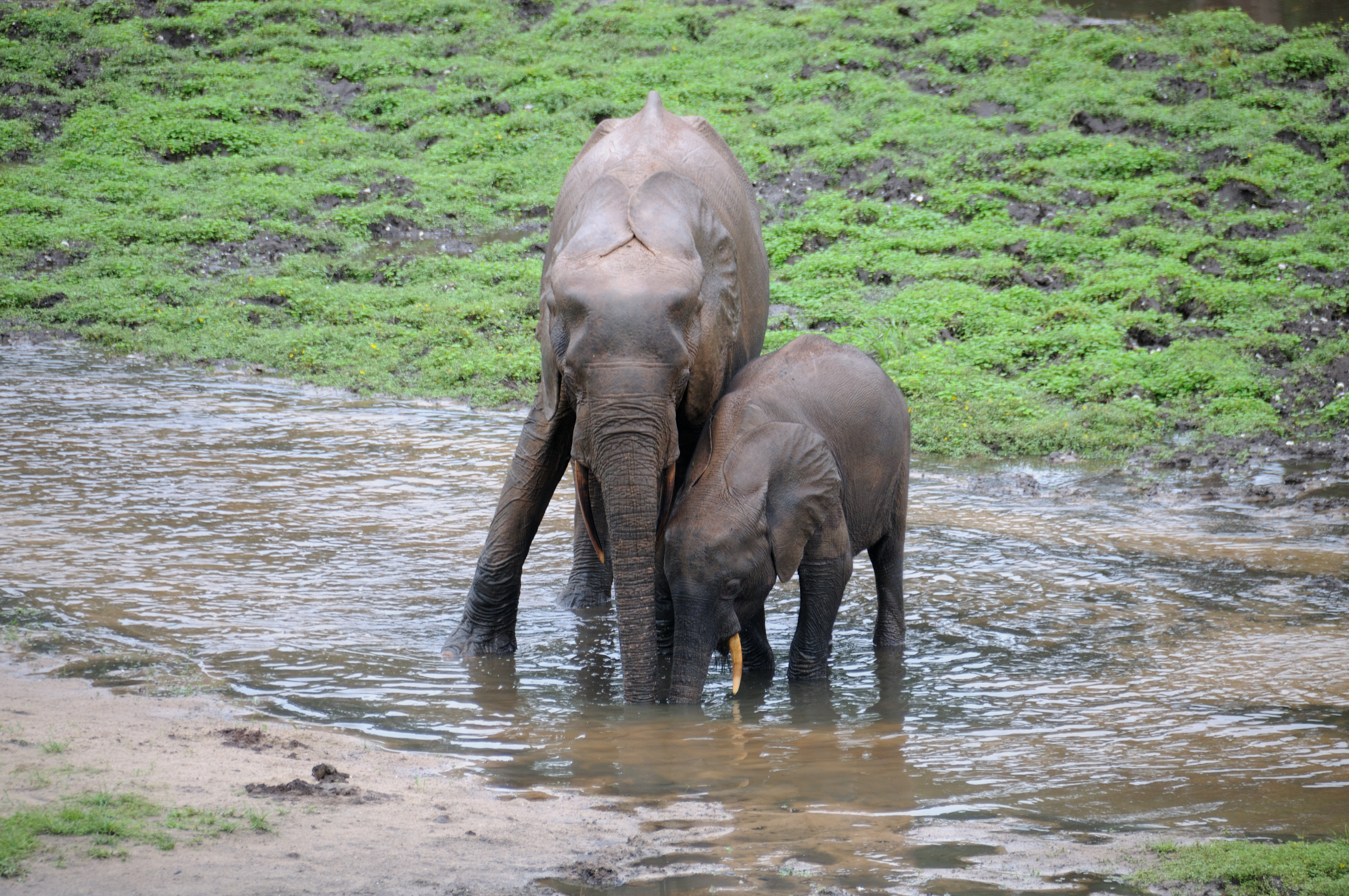
An African forest elephant and calf at Dzanga Bai

At Dzanga Bai, researchers are able to recognise individual elephants from the shape of their ears, tusks and other physical characteristics, allowing them to follow the same animals over many years. Turkalo and her colleagues have individually identified 3,128 forest elephants during a 20-year study at Dzanga Bai. The long-term monitoring programme has enabled researchers to reconstruct individual life histories and to study social organisation, communication, reproduction, habitat use and population dynamics. The data collected at Dzanga Bai have contributed to ecological studies of African forest elephants and have informed conservation planning across the Congo Basin.

Dzanga Bai forms part of the Dzanga-Sangha Special Reserve, which, together with the adjacent Lobéké National Park in Cameroon and Nouabalé-Ndoki National Park in the Republic of the Congo, forms the Sangha Trinational UNESCO World Heritage Site. The bai is managed jointly by the Central African authorities and the Wildlife Conservation Society (WCS), combining scientific research, anti-poaching patrols, community involvement and carefully managed ecotourism. African forest elephants are classified as Critically Endangered by the International Union for Conservation of Nature (IUCN). Monitoring at the bai has provided data used in their ecological research and conservation planning across the Congo Basin.

In May 2013, during a period of political instability in the Central African Republic, armed poachers entered Dzanga Bai and killed at least 26 African forest elephants in a single attack, which received international attention. Following the attack, anti-poaching patrols and ranger protection were strengthened with international support.
