= Nola, Central African Republic =

Nola
- City
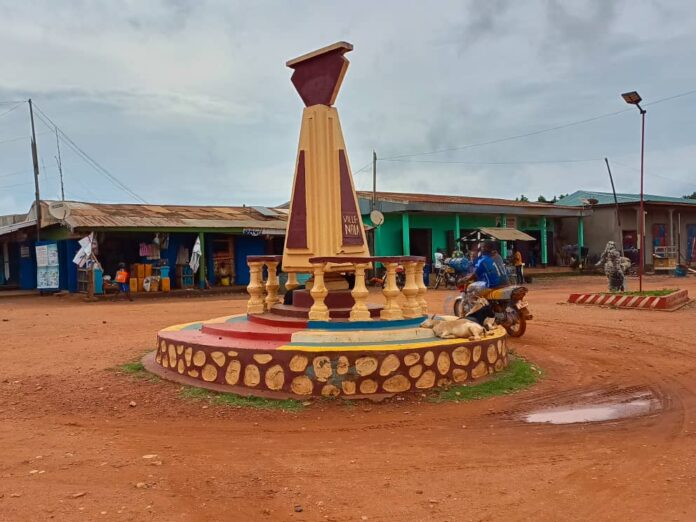
- Nola roundabout in 2023

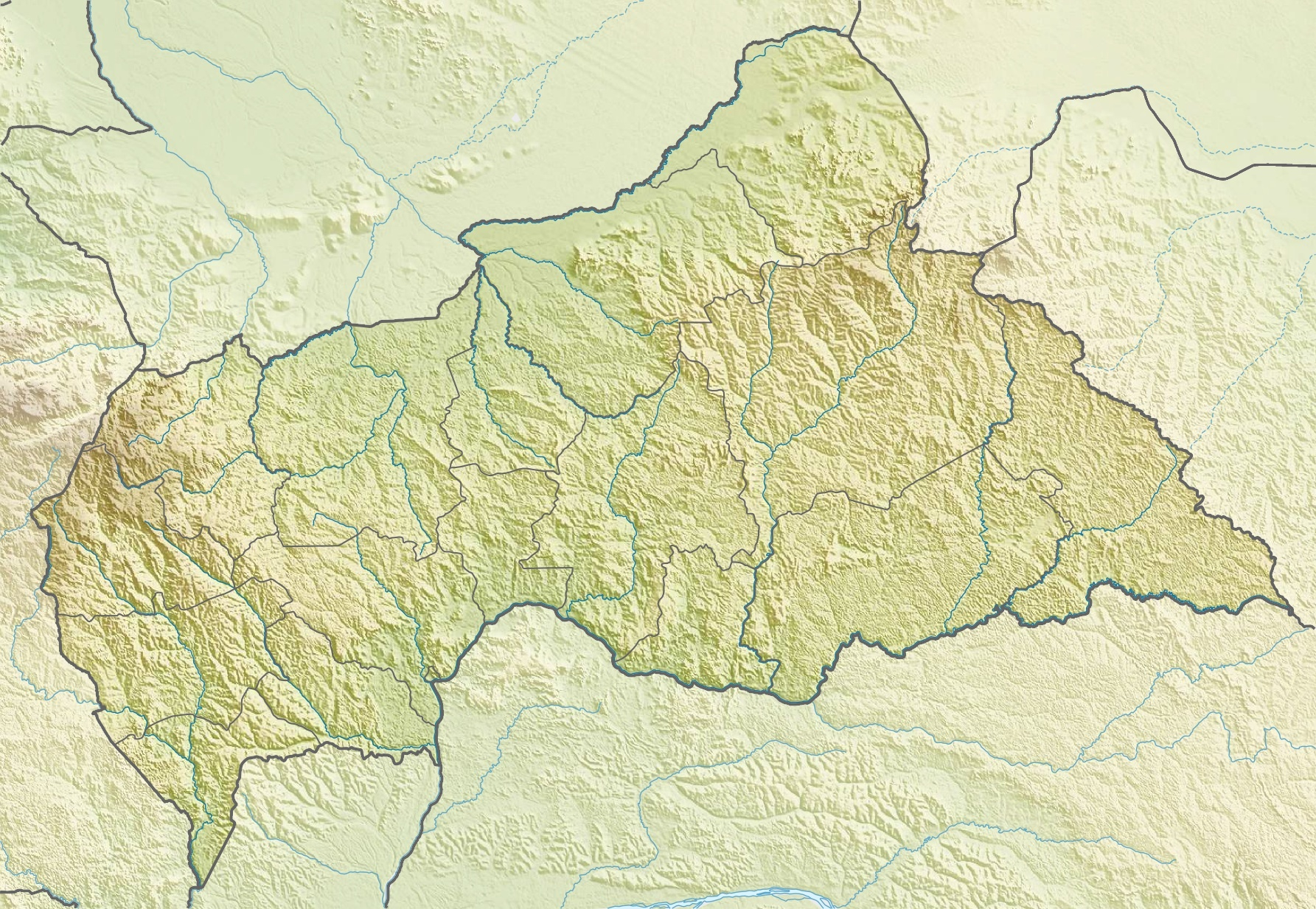
- Location in the Central African Republic
- Coordinates: 3°32′N 16°04′E
- Country: Central African Republic
- Prefecture: Sangha-Mbaéré

Government
  - Sub-Prefect: Janvier Seledonon
- Elevation: 442 m (1,450 ft)

Population (2012)
  - Total: 41,462
- Time zone: UTC+01:00 (WAT)

Nola is the capital of Sangha-Mbaéré, an economic prefecture of the Central African Republic. It is located at the confluence of the Kadéï and the Mambere river. The Sangha River is formed here due to the aforementioned rivers.

== History ==
In 1911, the area around Bouar was ceded by France to Germany under the terms of the Morocco-Congo Treaty, becoming part of the German colony of Neukamerun until it was reconquered by the French during World War I. During the war, local Gbaya chief Daddio provided many canoes to French Lieutenant Colonel Nicolas Hutin to help the French retake Nola from the Germans. Another local chief, Ngoukou I, also helped fight against the Germans.

Sleeping sickness had long been an issue in the areas around Nola. During the colonial period, French authorities embarked on a risky and now-disproven prophylactic campaign called 'lomidinisation'. Nola and Yokadouma in the French Congo were the centre of this misguided immunisation campaign.

On 28 March 2013 Nola was captured by Séléka forces. On 12 February 2014 the town was captured by Anti-balaka militias. 17 Muslims were killed in Nola in February 2014 by Anti-balakas while survivors fled to Cameroon. In September 2016 Nola was declared to be free from rebel groups.
