= Bayanga =

- sub-prefectures
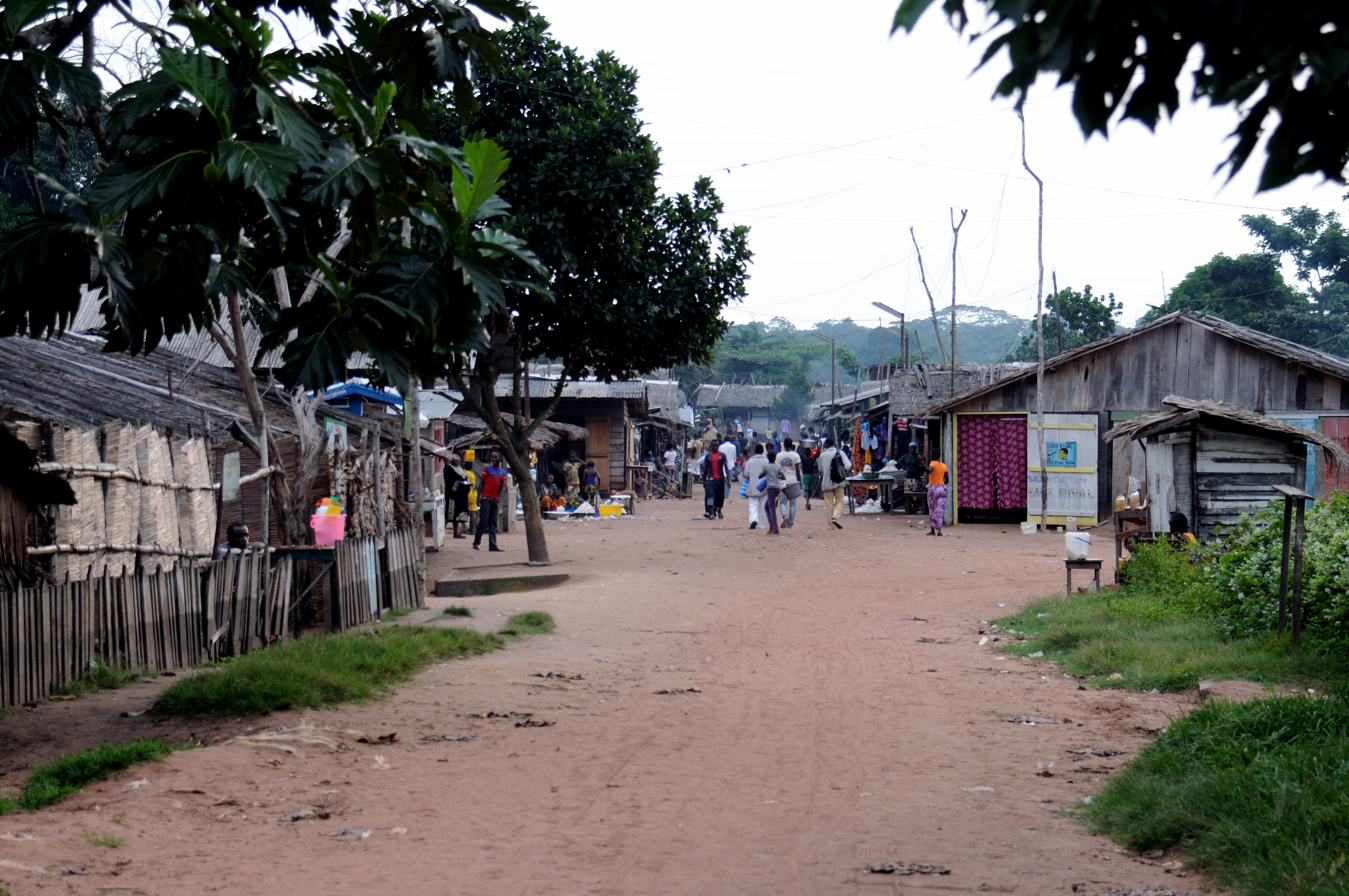
- Main street in Bayanga

- Location in Central African Republic
- Coordinates: 2°55′N 16°15′E
- Country: Central African Republic
- Prefecture: Sangha-Mbaéré

Government
  - Sub-Prefect: Stanislas Boulembe

Population (2021)
  - Total: 8,421

Bayanga is a town and sub-prefecture in Sangha-Mbaéré, south-western Central African Republic. Located on the left bank of the Sangha River, it is the main gateway to the Dzanga-Sangha Special Reserve, Dzanga-Ndoki National Park and the Sangha Trinational, a UNESCO World Heritage Site since 2012.

Bayanga is one of the country's few established nature tourism destinations. It serves as the logistical centre for conservation and scientific research in the Dzanga-Sangha Protected Areas and is the starting point for visits to Dzanga Bai, renowned for its large gatherings of African forest elephants, as well as for western lowland gorilla tracking and cultural visits to Aka communities.

Bayanga lies approximately 102 km south of Nola and about 520 km west of Bangui, within the tropical rainforest of the Congo Basin. According to a 2021 estimate, the sub-prefecture had a population of 8,421 inhabitants.

== Geography ==
Bayanga is located in south-western Central African Republic, within Sangha-Mbaéré, on the left bank of the Sangha River, close to the borders with Cameroon and the Republic of the Congo. The town lies approximately 102 km south of Nola and about 520 km west of Bangui.

The surrounding landscape is dominated by the tropical rainforest of the Congo Basin, one of the world's largest continuous forest ecosystems. The region has an equatorial climate, with high temperatures and abundant rainfall throughout the year.

Bayanga is the main settlement within the Dzanga-Sangha Special Reserve and serves as the principal access point to the Dzanga-Ndoki National Park. It is also the logistical base for conservation programmes, scientific research and ecotourism activities carried out in the protected area.

== History ==
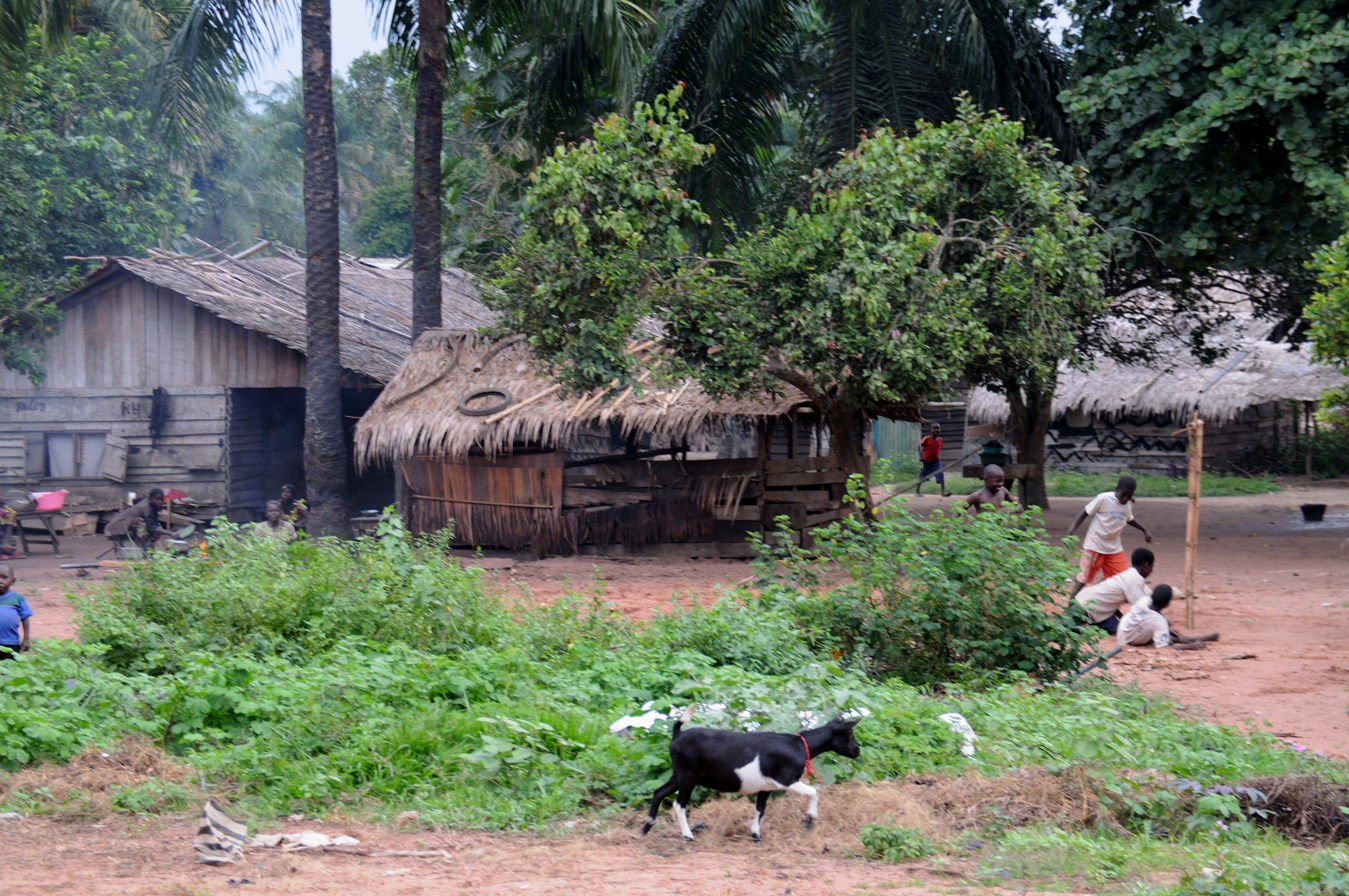
Traditional houses in Bayanga.

Bayanga originated as a small Sangha fishing village on the banks of the Sangha River, in a region traditionally inhabited by the Aka people, an Indigenous hunter-gatherer people of the Central African rainforest.

During the 1970s, the establishment of a sawmill transformed Bayanga into the main logging centre in south-western Central African Republic. The rapid expansion of the timber industry attracted workers from other parts of the country, as well as traders, missionaries and foreign businesses, leading to a period of rapid population growth.

In 1988, the Government of the Central African Republic and the World Wide Fund for Nature (WWF) launched the Dzanga-Sangha conservation project. This led to the creation of the Dzanga-Ndoki National Park and the Dzanga-Sangha Special Reserve in 1990, establishing Bayanga as the administrative and logistical centre for conservation activities in the region.

Since the mid-1990s, Bayanga has also developed as a centre for ecotourism. Visitors come to the region to observe African forest elephants at Dzanga Bai, track western lowland gorillas and learn about the culture of the Aka people. Ecotourism has become an important source of employment and income for the local population, complementing the traditional logging industry.

By 2004, the sawmill employed around 400 people, while conservation programmes and the protected areas provided employment for approximately 200 people.

=== Civil war ===
Bayanga was affected by the Central African Republic Civil War. On 10 March 2014, following the withdrawal of Séléka forces, the Bayanga sub-prefecture was captured by Anti-balaka militias.

The fighting and the resulting insecurity forced many residents to flee, particularly migrant workers employed in the logging industry. Government forces regained control of the town in late May 2014.

Despite the conflict, conservation programmes and ecotourism activities gradually resumed in the following years, and Bayanga recovered its role as the main gateway to the Dzanga-Sangha Special Reserve.

== Economy ==
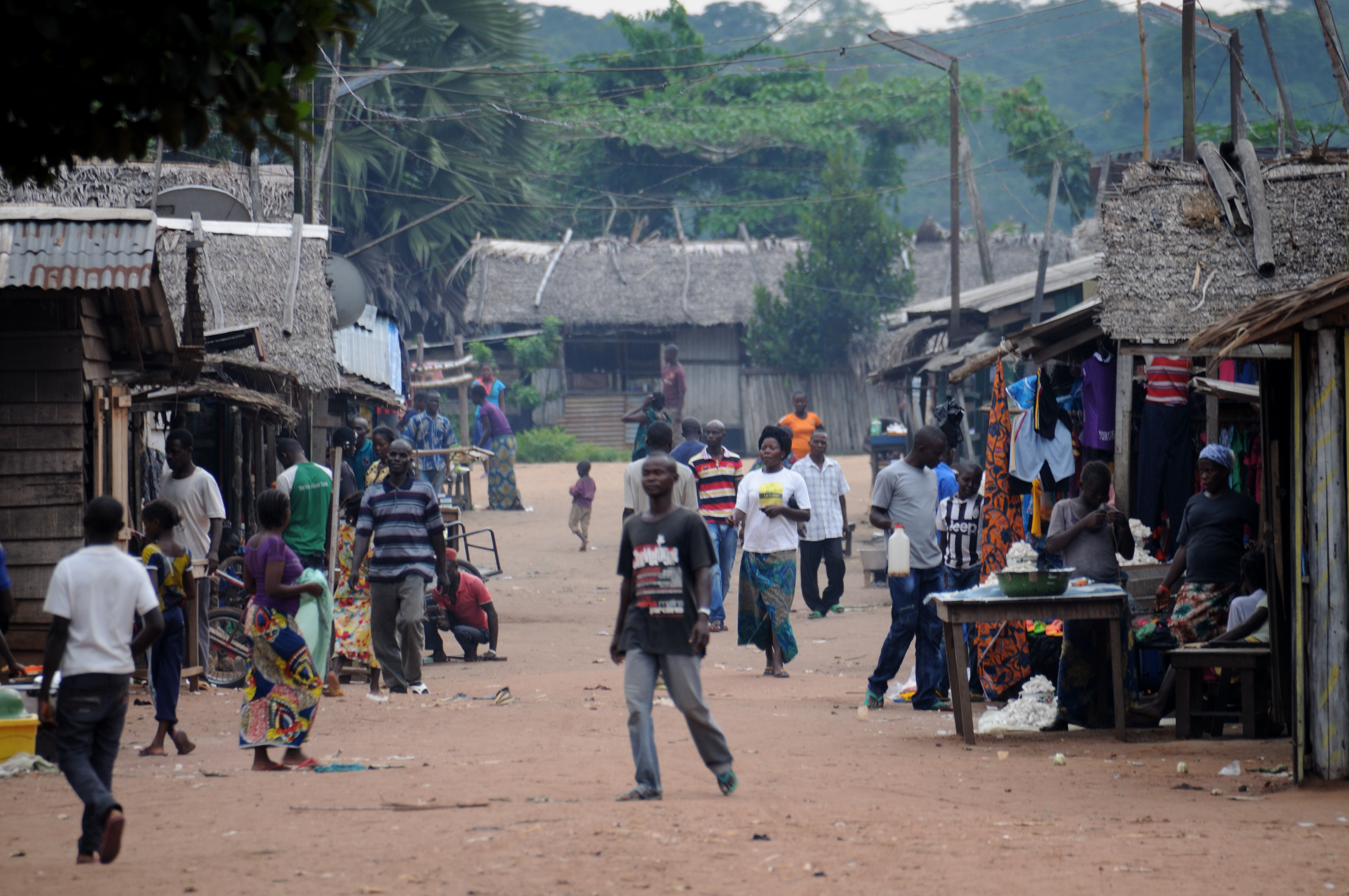
Market street in the centre of Bayanga.

Bayanga's economy has traditionally been based on the timber industry, which became established in the 1970s and remained the main source of employment for several decades.

Today, conservation and ecotourism play an increasingly important role. The town serves as the operational base for the management of the Dzanga-Sangha Special Reserve and Dzanga-Ndoki National Park, supporting conservation projects, scientific research and tourism-related services.

Tourism is centred on visits to Dzanga Bai, renowned for its gatherings of African forest elephants, as well as western lowland gorilla tracking and cultural experiences with Aka communities.

== See also ==
- Dzanga Bai
- Dzanga-Sangha Special Reserve
- Dzanga-Ndoki National Park
- Sangha Trinational
- Aka people
- African forest elephant
