= Sangha River =

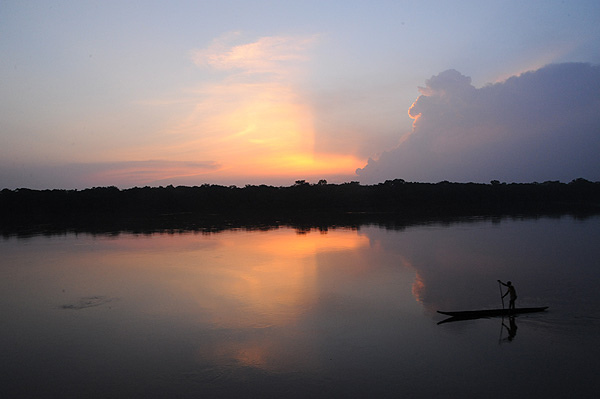
- The Sangha River in the Central African Republic

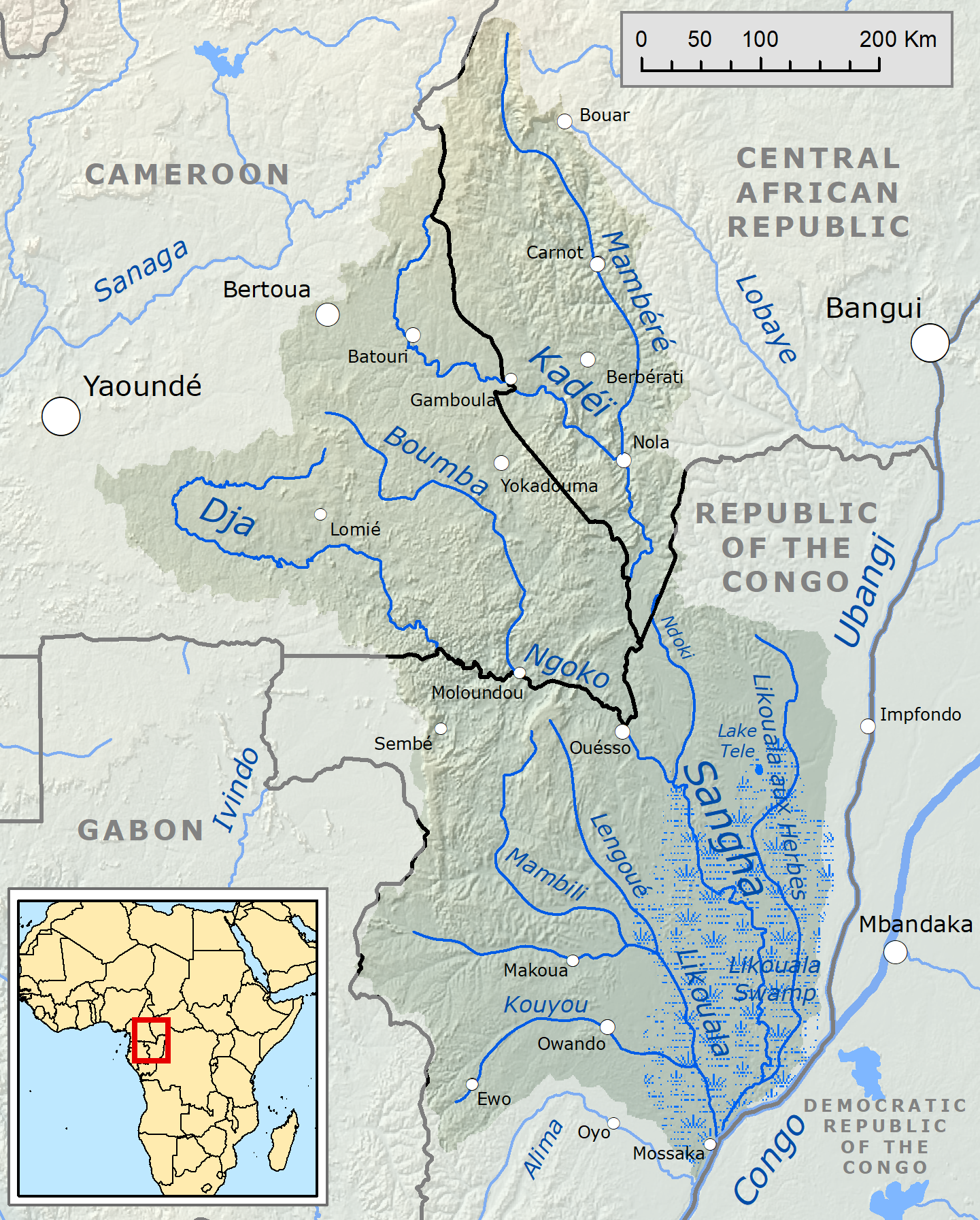
- Map of the Sangha River basin

Location
- Countries: Central African Republic, Cameroon, Republic of the Congo

Physical characteristics
- Source: Confluence of the Mambéré River and Kadéï River
  - location: Nola, Central African Republic
- Mouth: Congo River
  - location: Near Mossaka, Republic of the Congo
- Length: 790 km (490 mi)
- Basin size: 213,400 km2
- Discharge
  - location: Ouésso
  - average: 1,662 m3/s

Basin features
- Tributaries
  - left: Ngoko River

Sangha River (Kikongo: Nzâdi Sangha, Swahili: Mto Sanga, French: Rivière Sangha) is one of the principal right-bank tributaries of the Congo River in Central Africa. Formed by the confluence of the Mambéré River and the Kadéï River at Nola in the western Central African Republic, it flows for about 790 km (490 mi) through or along the borders of the Central African Republic, Cameroon and the Republic of the Congo before joining the Congo River near Mossaka.

The river drains a basin of approximately 213,400 km^{2} within the north-western Congo Basin, one of the world's largest continuous tropical rainforest regions. Its flow has been monitored at Ouésso, where the mean annual discharge was measured at 1,662 m^{3}/s between 1947 and 1983.

Much of the Sangha basin remains sparsely populated and is recognised for its exceptional biodiversity. The river flows through the Sangha Trinational, a transboundary conservation area that includes Dzanga-Ndoki National Park, Lobéké National Park and Nouabalé-Ndoki National Park. The area was inscribed as a UNESCO World Heritage Site in 2012 and provides habitat for species including the African forest elephant, western lowland gorilla and central chimpanzee.

== Geography ==
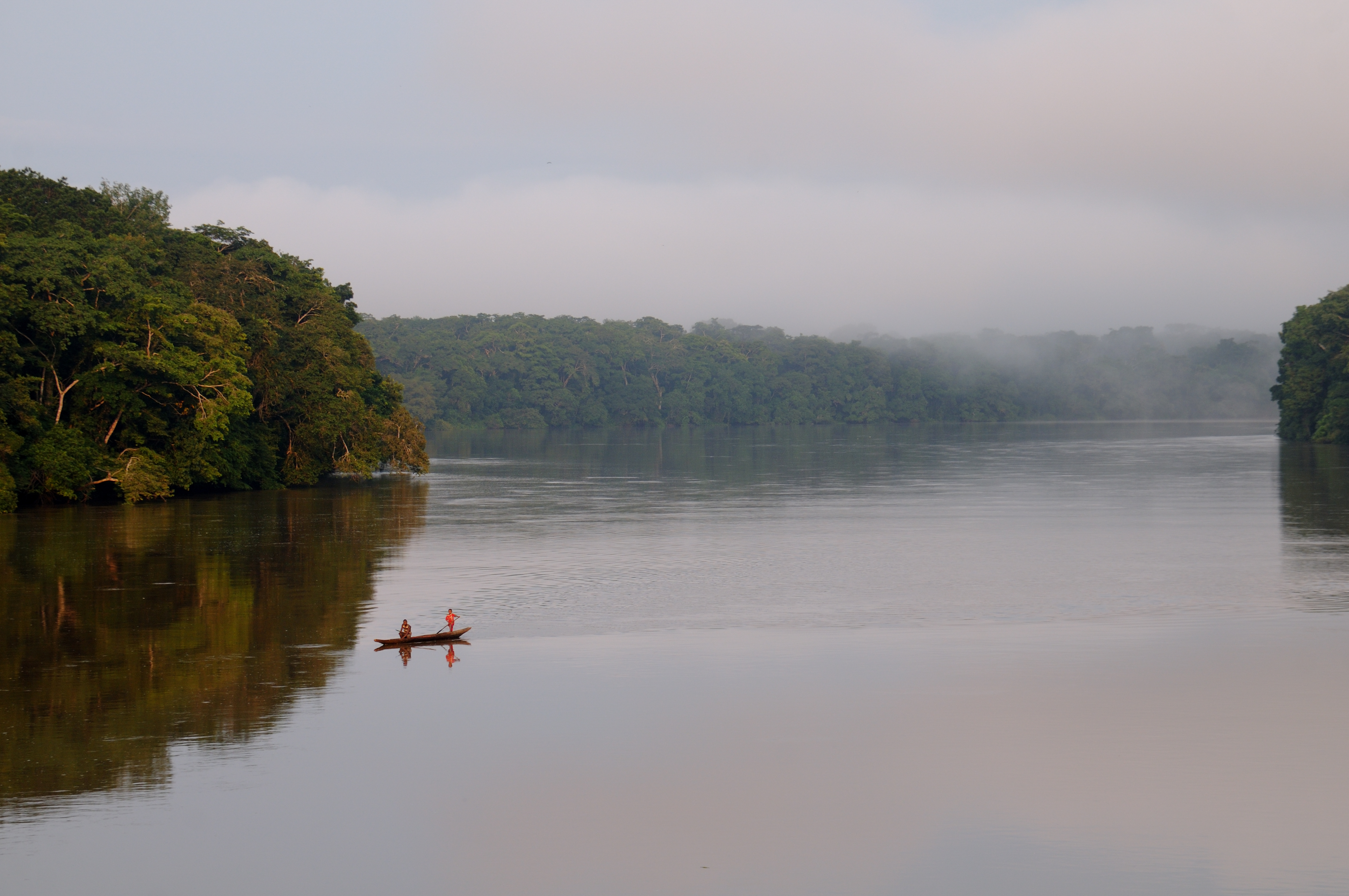
Morning mist over the Sangha River near Bayanga, Central African Republic.

The Sangha River is formed by the confluence of the Mambéré River and the Kadéï River at Nola in the western Central African Republic. From there it flows generally southwards, forming part of the border between the Central African Republic and Cameroon before entering the Republic of the Congo. It joins the Congo River near Mossaka.

The river drains part of the north-western Congo Basin, flowing through one of the largest remaining tracts of tropical rainforest in Africa. Along much of its course it forms a natural boundary between protected forest landscapes and provides access to remote settlements, including Bayanga in the Central African Republic and Ouésso in the Republic of the Congo.

Its principal tributary is the Ngoko River, which joins the Sangha near Sembé, Republic of the Congo.

== Hydrology ==
The flow of the Sangha River has been monitored at the hydrometric station of Ouésso, in the Republic of the Congo, approximately 400 km upstream from its confluence with the Congo River. Between 1947 and 1983, the station recorded a mean annual discharge of 1,662 m^{3}/s for a drainage area of 158,350 km^{2}, representing more than 70% of the river basin.

The Sangha has a relatively stable flow regime compared with many tropical African rivers, reflecting the high and evenly distributed rainfall across much of the Congo Basin rainforest. Seasonal fluctuations are nevertheless evident, with higher discharges during the main rainy season and lower flows towards the end of the dry season.

== Ecology ==
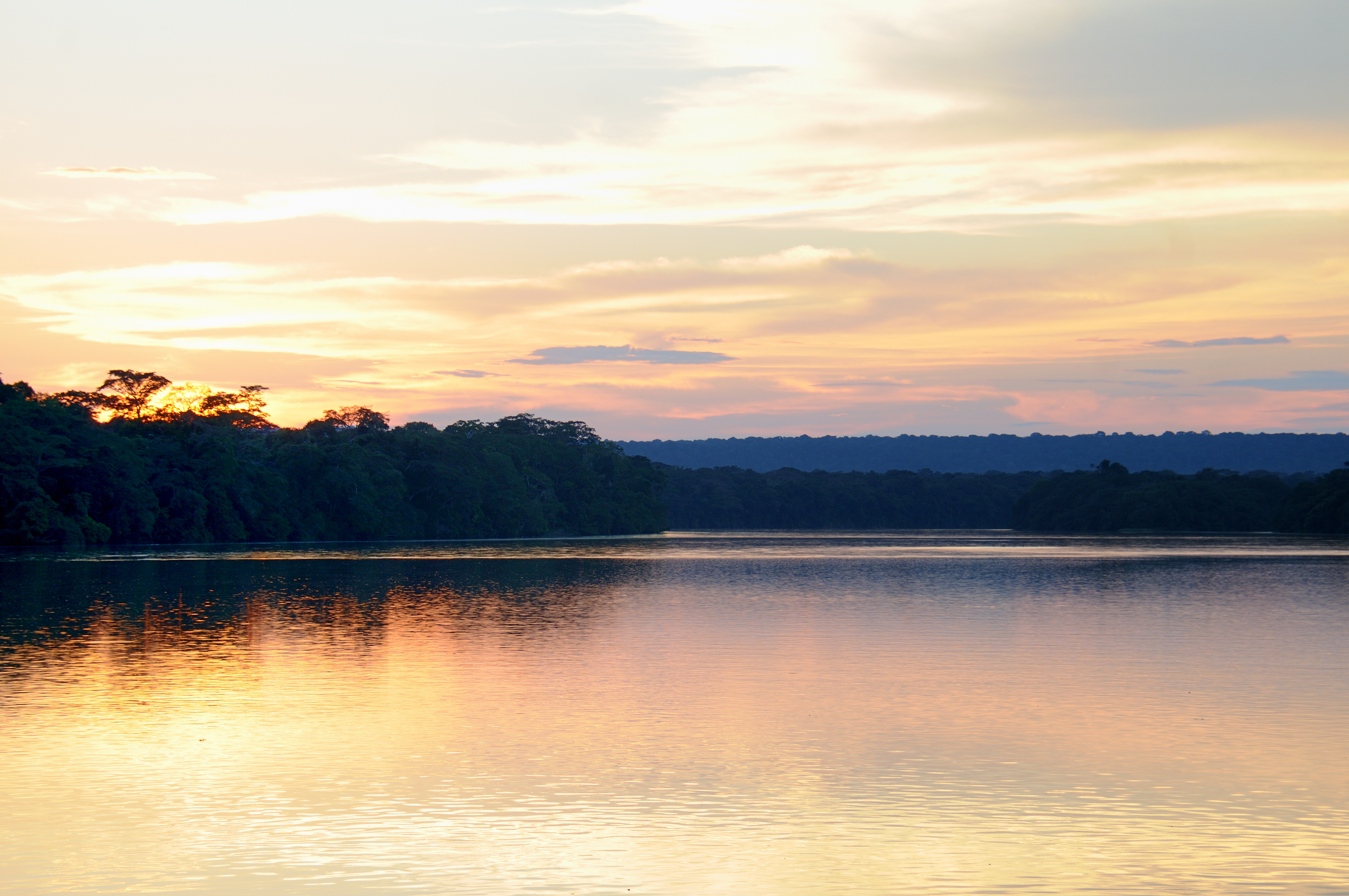
The Sangha River near Bayanga, surrounded by Congo Basin rainforest.

The Sangha River flows through one of the best-preserved sections of the Congo Basin rainforest. Much of its basin remains sparsely populated and retains extensive tracts of tropical moist forest that support exceptionally high levels of biodiversity.

Large areas of the river basin are protected through an interconnected network of conservation areas. The central section of the river forms part of the Sangha Trinational, a transboundary conservation complex shared by the Central African Republic, Cameroon and the Republic of the Congo. The site includes Dzanga-Ndoki National Park, Lobéké National Park and Nouabalé-Ndoki National Park, and was designated a UNESCO World Heritage Site in 2012.

The river and its surrounding forests provide habitat for numerous threatened species, including the African forest elephant, the western lowland gorilla, the central chimpanzee, as well as several species of forest antelope, primates and aquatic fauna. Seasonal flooding of the river also supports extensive wetlands recognised under the Ramsar Convention, with protected sites in Cameroon, the Central African Republic and the Republic of the Congo.

== Human activity ==
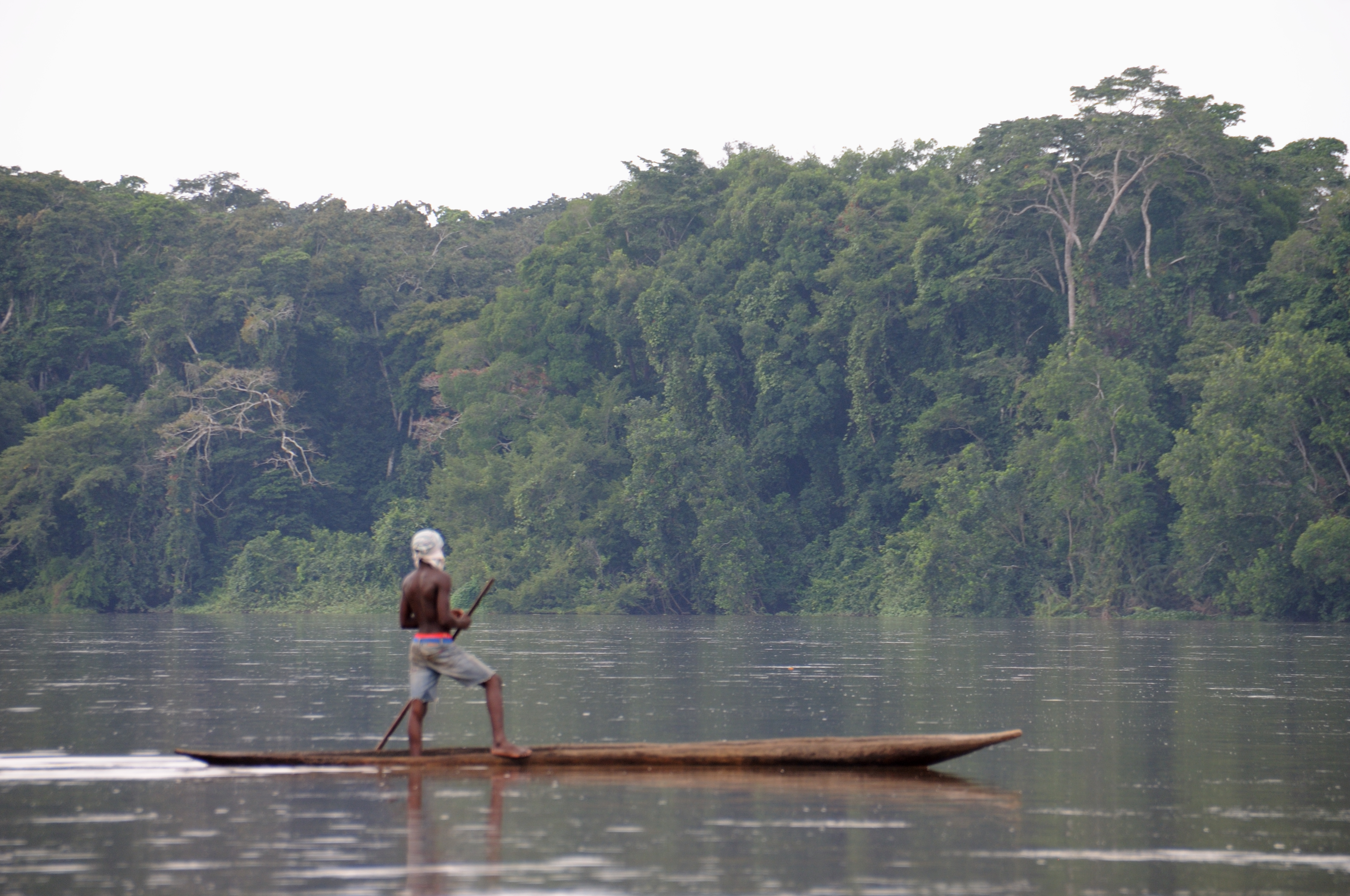
A traditional canoe on the Sangha River near Bayanga, used for local transport and fishing.

The Sangha River has long served as an important transport route through the forests of Central Africa. Although navigation is limited by seasonal water levels and the absence of major infrastructure, the river remains an essential means of transport for local communities, connecting settlements that are otherwise accessible only by unpaved roads or forest tracks.

Commercial logging has been one of the principal economic activities within the basin since the colonial period, with timber transported along the river and its tributaries. Fishing also provides an important source of food and income for riverside communities.

In the upper basin, particularly around Bayanga, the river supports ecotourism associated with the nearby protected areas of the Sangha Trinational. Visitors use the river to access sites such as Dzanga Bai, while tourism has become an important source of employment for local communities alongside conservation activities.

== History ==
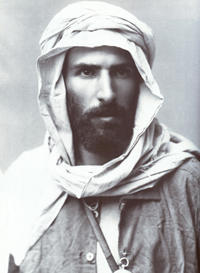
French explorer Pierre Savorgnan de Brazza, who explored the Sangha basin during the late nineteenth century.

For centuries, the Sangha River served as an important transportation corridor for the Indigenous peoples of the Congo Basin, facilitating travel, trade and communication between communities living along its banks and within the surrounding rainforest.

European exploration of the Sangha basin intensified during the late nineteenth century as France expanded its presence in Central Africa. Among the most prominent explorers was Pierre Savorgnan de Brazza, whose expeditions contributed to the exploration and mapping of the northern Congo Basin and helped establish French colonial administration in the region.

During the colonial period, the river became an important route for the extraction and transport of natural resources, especially rubber and tropical hardwoods. Logging has remained one of the principal economic activities in the basin, with timber transported along the Sangha and its tributaries to processing centres and ports on the Congo River.

From the late twentieth century onwards, increasing emphasis was placed on the conservation of the Sangha basin. Cooperation between Cameroon, the Central African Republic and the Republic of the Congo led to the creation of a transboundary network of protected areas. In 2012, the Sangha Trinational was inscribed as a UNESCO World Heritage Site in recognition of its exceptional biodiversity and relatively intact rainforest ecosystems.

== See also ==
- Congo River
- Sangha Trinational
- Congo Basin
