= Dzanga-Sangha Special Reserve =

Protected area in the Central African Republic

- IUCN category VI (protected area with sustainable use of natural resources)
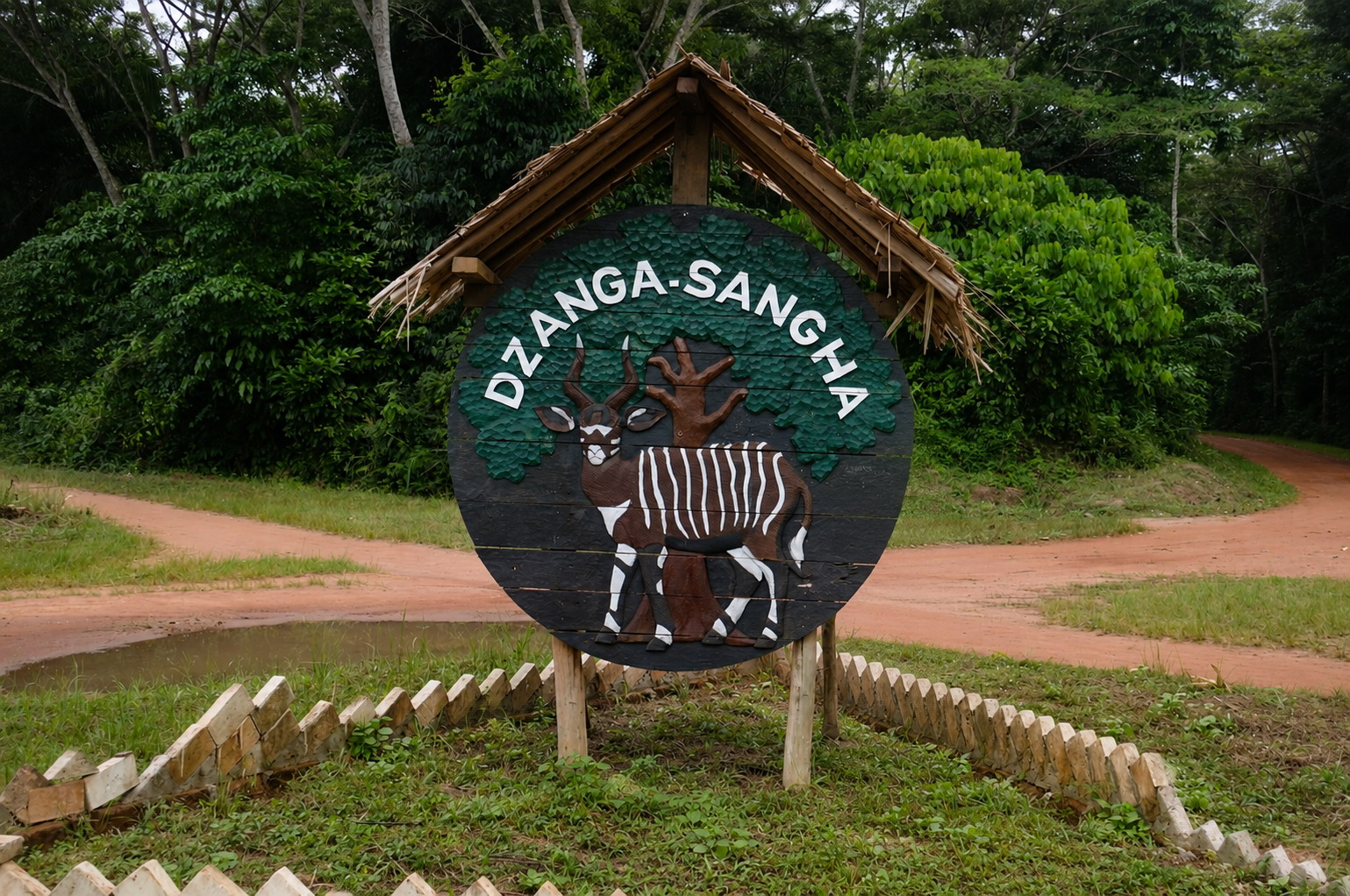
- Entrance to the Dzanga-Sangha Special Reserve near Bayanga.

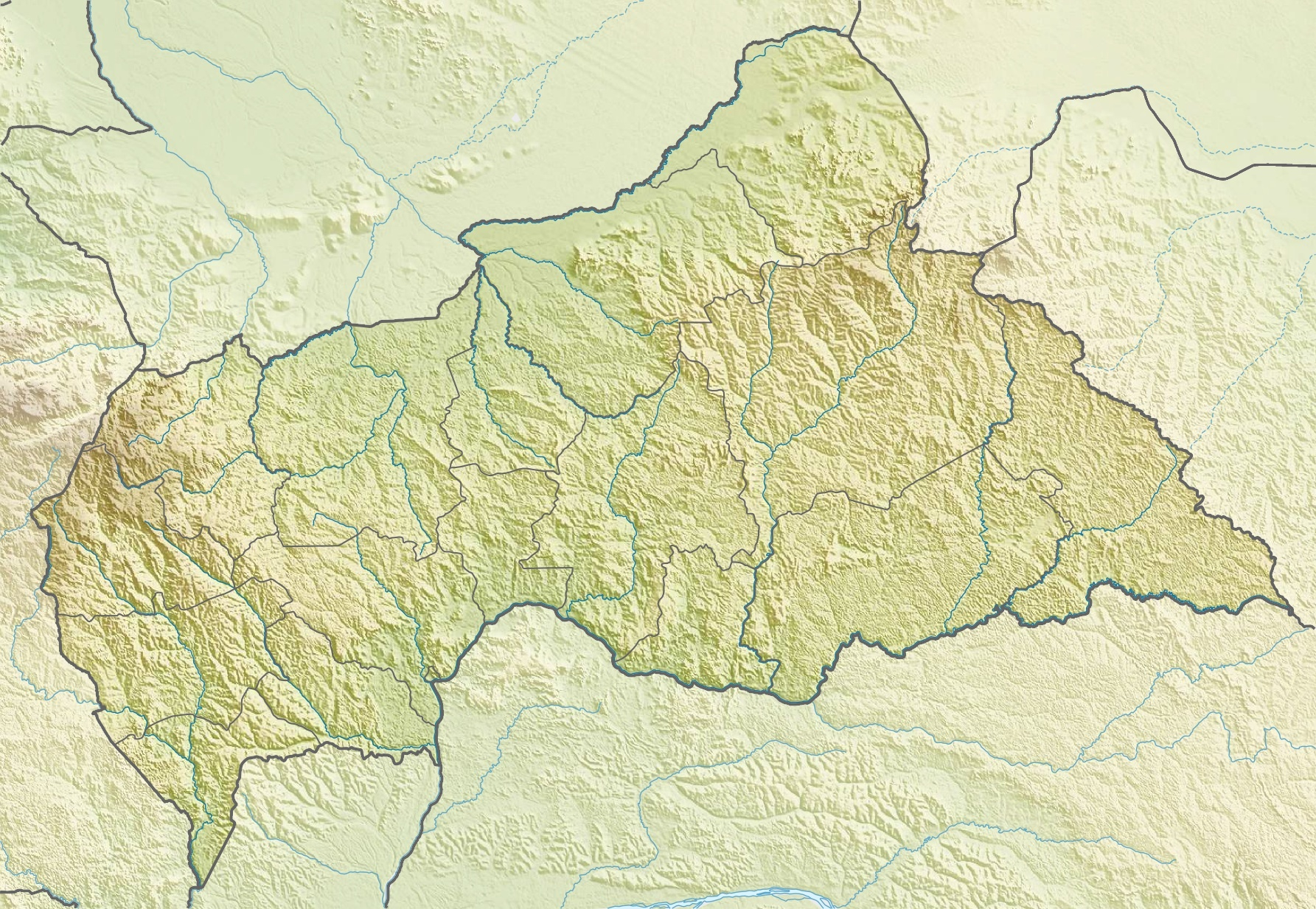
- Location within Central African Republic
- Location: Central African Republic
- Nearest city: Bayanga
- Coordinates: 3°6′N 16°20′E
- Area: 6,865.54 km^{2} (2,650.80 sq mi)
- Established: 1990

The Dzanga-Sangha Special Reserve is a protected area in southwestern Central African Republic, covering 6,865.54 km^{2} (2,650.80 sq mi) of tropical rainforest within the Congo Basin. Established in 1990, it surrounds Dzanga-Ndoki National Park, together forming the Dzanga-Sangha Complex of Protected Areas.

The reserve is one of the three protected areas that form the Sangha Trinational, a transboundary conservation landscape shared by the Central African Republic, Cameroon and the Republic of the Congo. Since 2012, the Sangha Trinational has been inscribed as a UNESCO World Heritage Site for its extensive intact forests and exceptional biodiversity.

Dzanga-Sangha is internationally known for its populations of African forest elephants and western lowland gorillas. It includes Dzanga Bai, one of the best-known forest clearings in Central Africa for observing forest elephants and other wildlife, as well as the Bai Hokou research and gorilla habituation site. The reserve is also home to indigenous Aka communities, who have traditionally depended on the surrounding rainforest.

== History ==
The Dzanga-Sangha Special Reserve was established in 1990 together with the adjacent Dzanga-Ndoki National Park to protect a large area of tropical rainforest in the southwestern Central African Republic. The two protected areas form the Dzanga-Sangha Complex of Protected Areas, combining a multiple-use reserve with a strictly protected national park.

Since its creation, the reserve has been managed through cooperation between the government of the Central African Republic and international conservation organisations, notably the WWF. Conservation programmes have focused on protecting forest elephants and western lowland gorillas while supporting scientific research and involving local communities, particularly the indigenous Aka.

Regional cooperation expanded in 1999 with the signing of the Yaoundé Declaration, followed by the Agreement on the Establishment of the Sangha Trinational on 7 December 2000 by Cameroon, the Central African Republic and the Republic of the Congo.

In 2012, the Sangha Trinational was inscribed on the UNESCO World Heritage List in recognition of its outstanding biodiversity and the protection of one of the largest intact rainforest ecosystems in Central Africa.

== Geography and climate ==
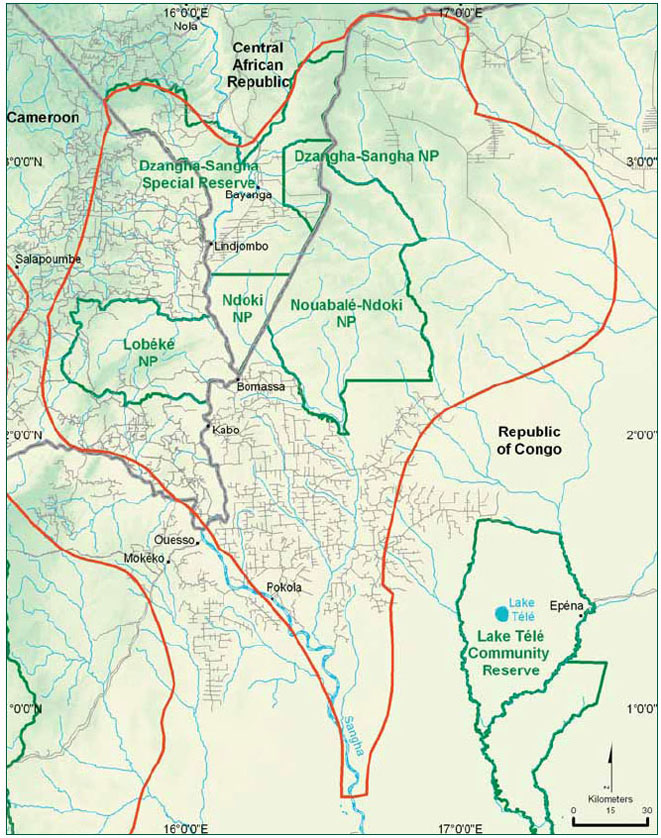
Map of the Sangha Trinational conservation landscape, showing the location of the Dzanga-Sangha Special Reserve.

The Dzanga-Sangha Special Reserve is located in the southwestern part of the Central African Republic, bordering Cameroon and the Republic of the Congo. Together with the adjacent Dzanga-Ndoki National Park, it forms the Dzanga-Sangha Complex of Protected Areas, one of the three protected areas that make up the Sangha Trinational.

The reserve lies within the Congo Basin and is covered mainly by lowland tropical rainforest. The Sangha River forms part of its western boundary and is the main river of the region. Bayanga, on the river, is the principal settlement and the main point of access to both the reserve and the national park.

Several natural forest clearings, known locally as bais, are found within the reserve. The best known is Dzanga Bai, where large numbers of African forest elephants gather throughout the year. Bai Hokou is the centre of the reserve's western lowland gorilla research and habituation programme.

The climate is equatorial, with average annual rainfall of about 1,500 mm (59 in). There are two rainy seasons, from May to June and from October to November, separated by relatively drier periods. Average temperatures generally range between 24 °C (75 °F) and 29 °C (84 °F) throughout the year.

== Flora and fauna ==
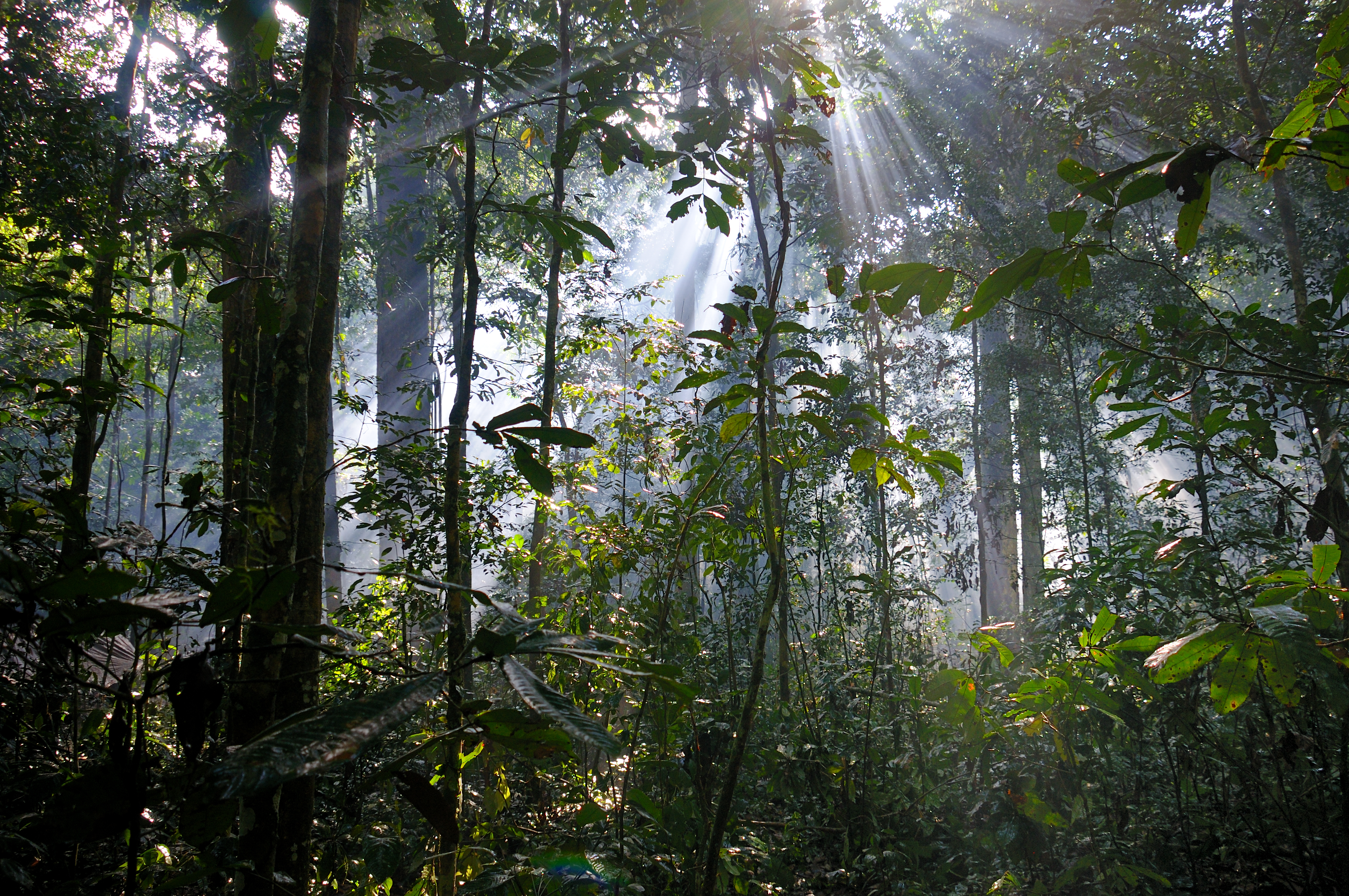
Primary rainforest in the Dzanga-Sangha Special Reserve.

The Dzanga-Sangha Special Reserve protects one of the largest remaining tracts of lowland rainforest in the Congo Basin. Its forests support a rich diversity of wildlife, including important populations of African forest elephant and western lowland gorilla.

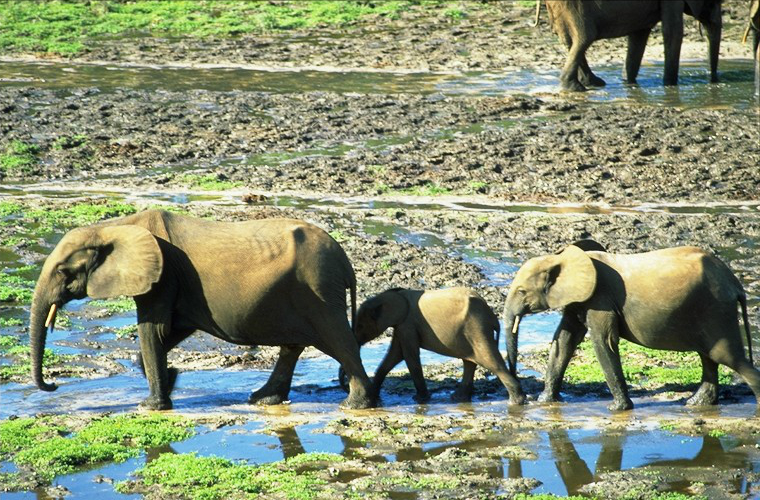
Forest elephants at Dzanga Bai.

Other large mammals include the African forest buffalo, common chimpanzee, bongo, bushpig, grey-cheeked mangabey, several species of duiker, and numerous other forest primates. Predators include the leopard and the African golden cat, while three species of pangolin have also been recorded in the reserve.

The reserve has been an important centre for research on forest elephants and western lowland gorillas for several decades. Long-term studies at Dzanga Bai and Bai Hokou have contributed to the understanding of elephant behaviour, gorilla ecology and tropical forest conservation.

The vegetation is dominated by mixed lowland tropical rainforest with hundreds of plant species. Characteristic trees include Entandrophragma angolense, Lophira alata, Manilkara mabokeensis, Monodora myristica, Ricinodendron heudelotii, the African tulip tree, rubber trees and strangler figs.

=== Mammals ===
Larger mammals recorded in the reserve include:

Proboscidea

- African forest elephant (Loxodonta cyclotis)

Artiodactyls

- Hippopotamus (Hippopotamus amphibius)
- Red river hog (Potamochoerus porcus)
- Giant forest hog (Hylochoerus meinertzhageni)
- Water chevrotain (Hyemoschus aquaticus)
- African forest buffalo (Syncerus caffer nanus)
- Bushbuck (Tragelaphus scriptus)
- Bongo (Boocercus euryceros)
- Sitatunga (Tragelaphus spekei)
- Blue duiker (Cephalophus monticola)
- Black-fronted duiker (Cephalophus nigrifrons)
- White-bellied duiker (Cephalophus leucogaster)
- Peters's duiker (Cephalophus callipygus)
- Yellow-backed duiker (Cephalophus silvicultor)
- Bay duiker (Cephalophus dorsalis)
- Bates's pygmy antelope (Neotragus batesi)

Aardvarks

- Aardvark (Orycteropus afer)

Hyraxes

- Western tree hyrax (Dendrohyrax dorsalis)

Carnivora

- Leopard (Panthera pardus)
- African golden cat (Profelis aurata)
- African palm civet (Nandinia binotata)
- African civet (Civettictis civetta)
- Servaline genet (Genetta servalina)
- Large-spotted genet (Genetta tigrina)
- Black-footed mongoose (Bdeogale nigripes)
- Marsh mongoose (Atilax paludinosus)
- Long-nosed mongoose (Herpestes nasoi)
- Spotted-necked otter (Hydrictis maculicollis)
- Congo clawless otter (Aonyx congica)
- Honey badger (Mellivora capensis)

Pangolins

- Long-tailed pangolin (Manis tetradactyla)
- Tree pangolin (Manis tricuspis)
- Giant pangolin (Manis gigantea)

Elephant shrews

- Four-toed elephant shrew (Petrodromus tetradactylus )

Primates

- Chimpanzee (Pan troglodytes)
- Western lowland gorilla (Gorilla gorilla gorilla)
- Central African red colobus (Colobus foai oustaleti)
- Mantled guereza (Colobus guereza)
- Olive baboon (Papio anubis)
- Agile mangabey (Cercocebus agilis)
- Grey-cheeked mangabey (Lophocebus albigena)
- De Brazza's monkey (Cercopithecus neglectus)
- Crested mona monkey (Cercopithecus pogonias)
- Greater spot-nosed monkey (Cercopithecus nictitans)
- Moustached guenon (Cercopithecus cephus)
- Allen's swamp monkey (Allenopithecus nigroviridis)
- Potto (Perodicticus potto)
- Southern needle-clawed bushbaby (Euoticus elegantulus)
- Allen's galago (Galago alleni)
- Senegal galago (Galago senegalensis)
- Demidoff's galago (Galagoides demidovii)
- Golden Angwantibo (Arctocebus aureus)

== Human population ==
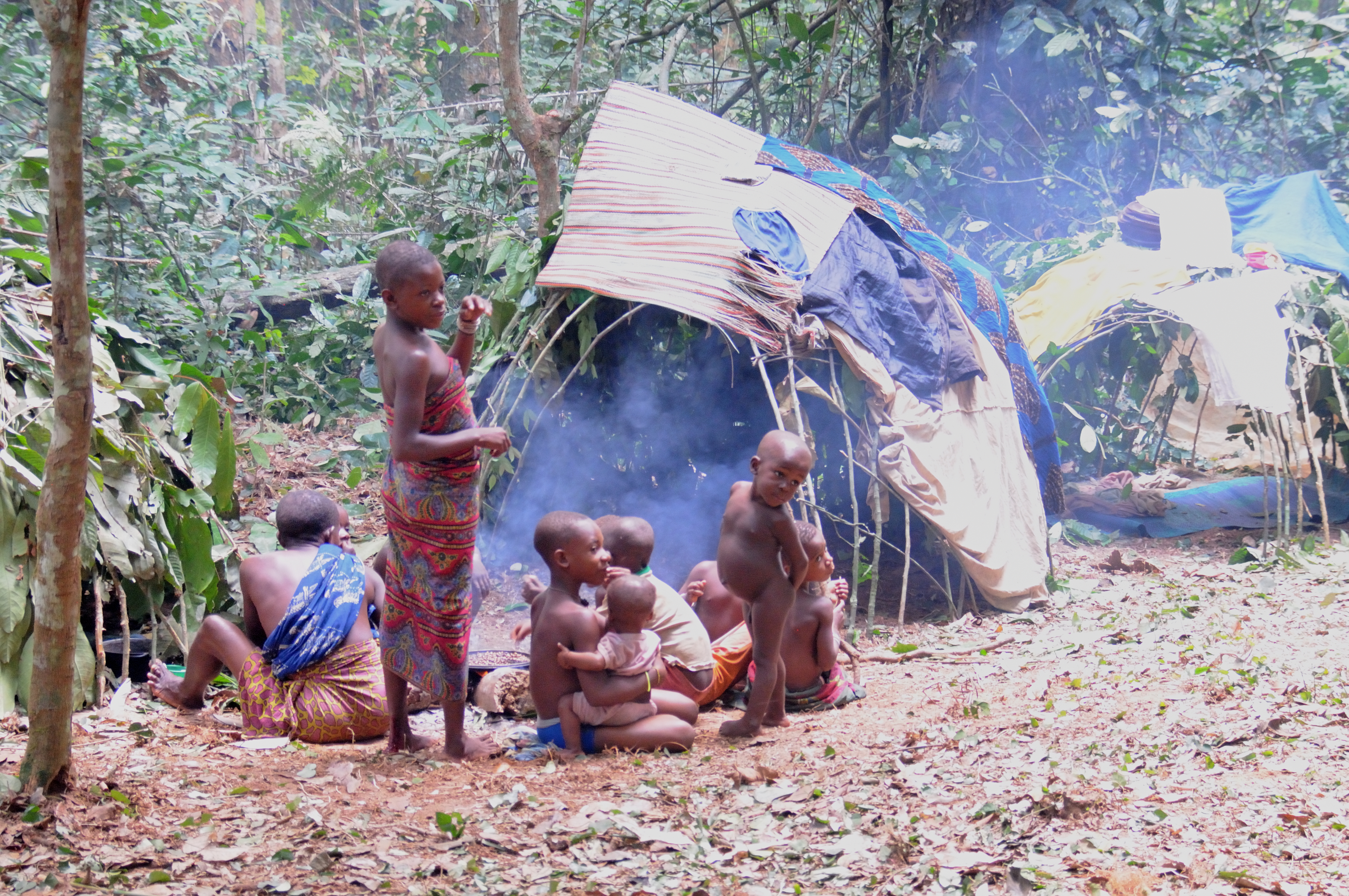
A BaAka family camp in the Dzanga-Sangha protected area.

The main settlement in and around the reserve is Bayanga, on the Sangha River. Several smaller villages are located along the main road through the reserve and in the surrounding forest.

The reserve is home to the indigenous Aka, one of the traditional hunter-gatherer peoples of the Congo Basin. The Aka have lived in these forests for generations and possess extensive knowledge of the local wildlife, plants and seasonal resources. Hunting, fishing and gathering remain an important part of their way of life, although many families also practise small-scale agriculture or live partly in settled villages.

The Aka play an important role in the management of the reserve. Many work as wildlife trackers, field assistants and guides for research and conservation projects, particularly those involving western lowland gorillas. Their knowledge of the rainforest has also contributed to the development of ecotourism in Dzanga-Sangha.

== Research and tourism ==
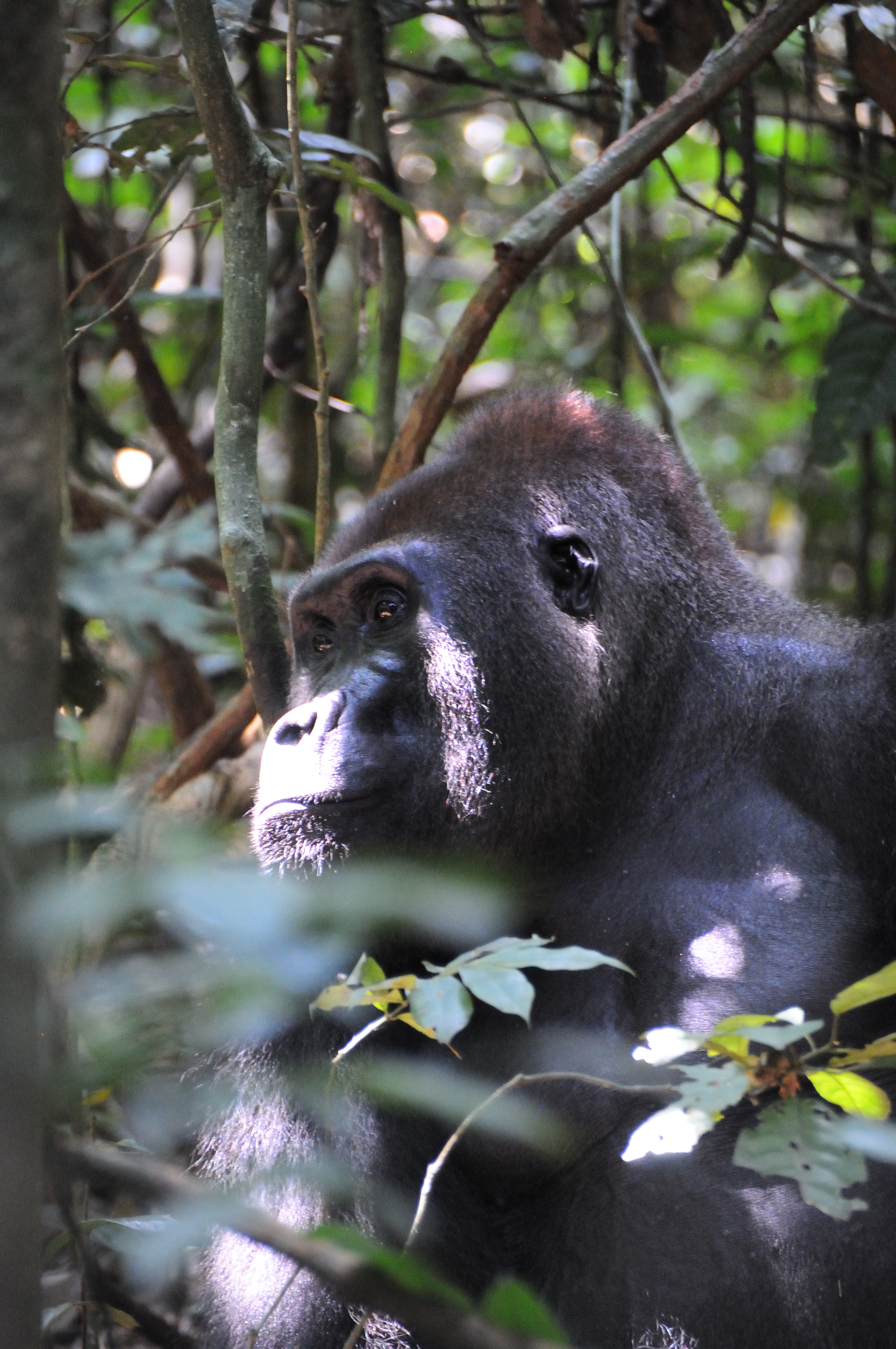
Western lowland silverback at Bai Hokou.

Dzanga-Sangha has been an important site for research on western lowland gorillas and African forest elephants in Central Africa for more than three decades. Research at Dzanga Bai has contributed to the understanding of forest elephant behaviour, while long-term studies at Bai Hokou have focused on gorilla ecology, behaviour and habituation.

Visitors can track habituated western lowland gorillas at Bai Hokou under the supervision of guides and Aka trackers, whose knowledge of the rainforest plays an important role in locating and monitoring the animals.

Dzanga Bai is one of the reserve's main visitor attractions. The forest clearing is well known for the large numbers of African forest elephants that gather there to feed on mineral-rich soils, and has become one of the best-known wildlife viewing sites in the Congo Basin.

The reserve has also hosted several long-term research projects, including the Elephant Listening Project, which uses acoustic monitoring to study forest elephant communication at Dzanga Bai.
