= Arrest of a Suspect in Sarajevo =

1914 iconic press photograph

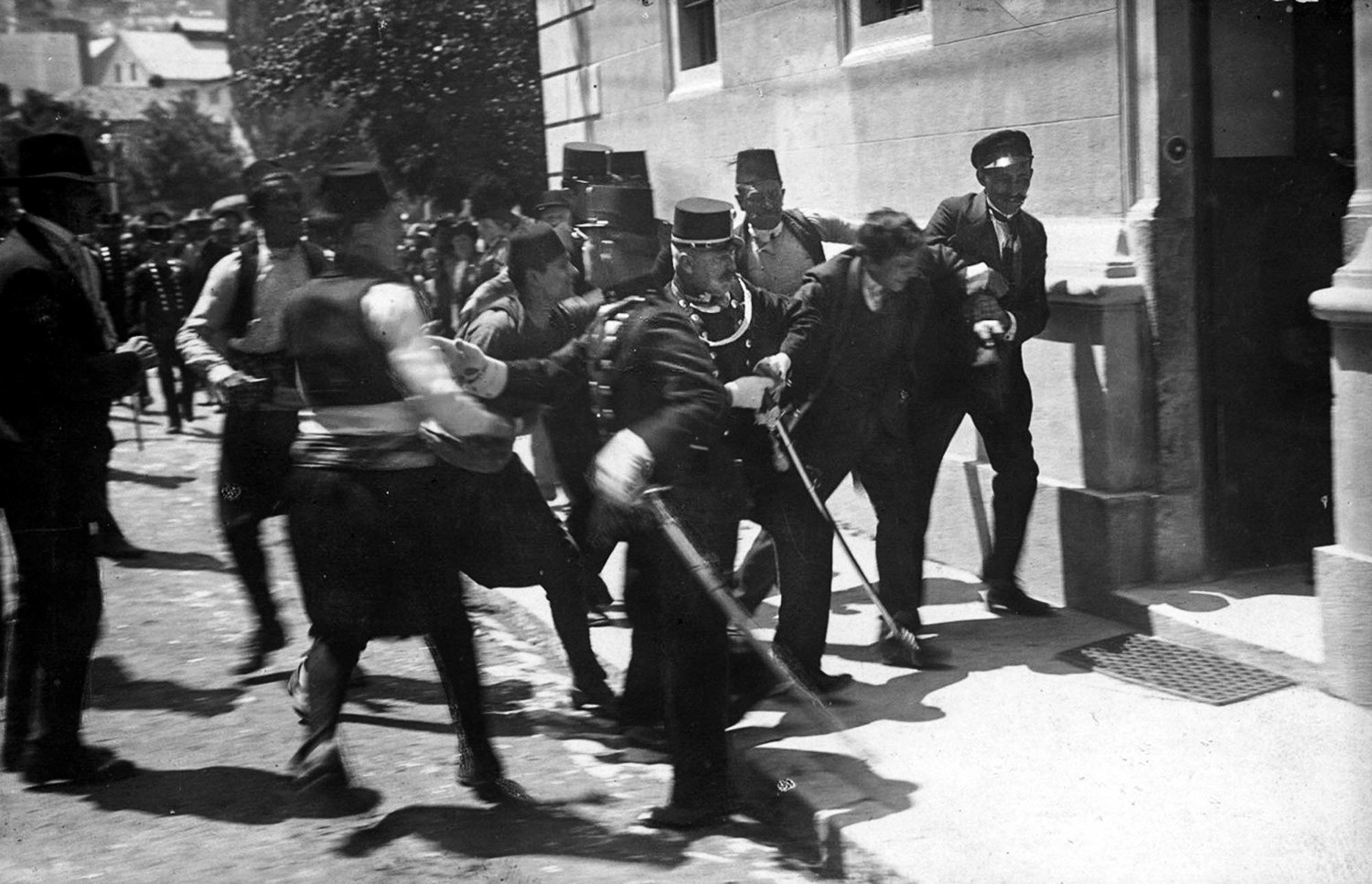
Arrest of a Suspect in Sarajevo, 1914

Arrest of a Suspect in Sarajevo is a widely circulated press photograph taken in the immediate aftermath of the assassination of Archduke Franz Ferdinand in Sarajevo on 28 June 1914, and published on 5 July 1914. For much of the twentieth century, the image was published and captioned as depicting the arrest of Gavrilo Princip, the Bosnian Serb nationalist who carried out the assassination and whose actions helped to trigger the First World War.

The photograph, which shows a young man being led away by Austro-Hungarian gendarmes, appeared on the front page of the Viennese magazine Wiener Bilder on 5 July 1914. It was subsequently reproduced in newspapers, schoolbooks, museum displays, and historical publications across Europe, becoming one of the most recognisable representations of the Sarajevo assassination in public memory.

Beginning in the mid-twentieth century, historians and researchers including Vladimir Dedijer, Tim Butcher, and Christopher Clark have questioned the identity of the man in the image. Scholarly consensus now holds that it does not depict Princip, but rather Ferdinand Behr, a bystander and friend of Princip who was mistakenly arrested during the confusion following the attack. Despite this, versions of the image have continued to appear under incorrect captions well into the 21st century.

== Background ==
On 28 June 1914, Archduke Franz Ferdinand, the heir to the Austro-Hungarian Empire, and his wife, Sophie, were assassinated while visiting Sarajevo, the provincial capital of Bosnia-Herzegovina. The assassination occurred at close range as they were shot from a crowded sidewalk. At that time, Bosnia-Herzegovina had been under the occupation of Austria-Hungary since 1878 and was formally annexed in 1908. The shooter was identified as Gavrilo Princip, a teenage Bosnian Serb and a member of Mlada Bosna, an organisation dedicated to the liberation of Bosnia from Austria-Hungarian rule and the unification of all Southern Slavs, including Serbs, Croats, and Muslims. Following the assassination, Gavrilo Princip was promptly arrested, along with numerous other suspects associated with the organisation.

The assassination had a profound impact on inter-ethnic relations, leading to pogrom-like anti-Serb riots, in some instances encouraged by Austro-Hungarian authorities. These violent events resulted in Bosnian Muslims and Croats engaging in violence against Serbs in Sarajevo and other parts of Bosnia and Herzegovina, leading to the destruction of schools, houses, and restaurants, as well as looting of shops.

Governor Oskar Potiorek of Bosnia, who had been responsible for the security of the Archduke and his wife, responded by ordering the arrest of all individuals suspected of being involved in the plot. Within the first forty-eight hours after the assassination, over two hundred prominent Serbs were apprehended and taken to prison in Sarajevo alone. By the end of July, around 5,000 Serbs had been jailed, and approximately 150 of them faced capital punishment by hanging. (Note: The assassination of the Archduke by a Bosnian Serb provided the pretext for Austria-Hungary's invasion of Serbia, leading to the outbreak of World War I.) With the exception of Muhamed Mehmedbašić, a Bosnian Muslim, who managed to escape to Montenegro, all other conspirators were arrested. The Austrian police investigators did not pursue Mehmedbašić for political reasons, as they sought to emphasise the plot's exclusively Serbian nature. Among those involved, three individuals, namely Princip, Cabrinović, and Grabez, received twenty years' imprisonment, avoiding the death penalty due to their age. Additionally, three others received jail terms, while five were executed by hanging.

The actual act itself is not documented, but there are "numerous press illustrations of little reliability but great imagination." One photograph, commonly referred to as "the arrest of a suspect in Sarajevo," has been repeatedly reproduced in various books and articles over the following weeks, months, and years, claiming to depict the arrest of murderer Gavrilo Princip.

== Photograph ==
=== Description ===
This photograph holds significance in the context of the murder of Archduke Franz Ferdinand and his wife. It portrays a disheveled young man wearing a dark suit, being forcibly taken towards the entrance of a building, presumably a police station. In the foreground, armed Austro-Hungarian gendarmes are shown restraining a group of Bosnian Muslims, recognisable by their traditional attire, which includes fezzes, short waistcoats, and Turkish trousers, while bystanders across the street observe the scene.

According to Professor of Art History Rebecca Houze, the diversity of dress displayed in the photograph adds to a sense of chaos and agitation in the moment, and "reminds us of the roots of the assassination in ethnic tension and nationalistic conflict".

=== Identity of the main subject ===
The image has been widely published in numerous school and history books, continuing to be included in present-day publications; it is often accompanied by headlines such as "The Man Who Began The Great War" and descriptions that label it as "the unique photograph showing the arrest of Princip, the Serbian student, immediately after he had assassinated Archduke Franz Ferdinand of Austria and his wife in Sarajevo on June 26, 1914." Educators have even recommended its use in classrooms as "The arrest of Gavrilo Princip . . . an example of photographs that have played a role in shaping our understanding of 20th-century Europe".

The image has garnered notable recognition, being listed as one of the World's Best Photographs in 1940 and included in the compilation "Photos that Changed the World" in 2006, with the caption "Arrest of Archduke Ferdinand's assassin." Consequently, it is widely assumed that the primary subject of the photograph is Gavrilo Princip, the assassin, being apprehended immediately after the fatal shooting.

On 29 March 1955, an article published in the Yugoslav journal Republika raised doubts about the identity of the man being arrested in the photograph, suggesting that Princip could not be the person depicted in the image. Subsequently, in 1966, Yugoslav historian Vladimir Dedijer (1914–1990) conducted an investigation for his reference book The Road to Sarajevo, which focused on the assassination of the Archduke by Princip. Dedijer's research also led to the conclusion that the individual shown in the photograph was not Gavrilo Princip.

Another young man, Ferdinand Behr, tried to help Princip. He too was arrested, and while he was being taken to the police, a photographer took his picture . . . his picture later appeared in many newspapers and books, some of them years after the assassination.

— Vladimir Dedijer, in The Road to Sarajevo (1966),

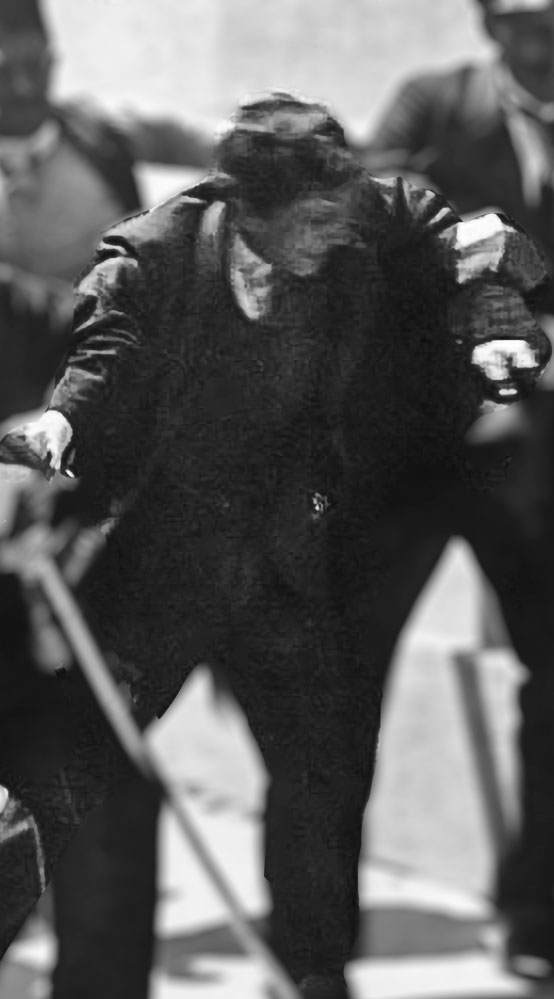
According to historian Christopher Andrew, the photograph shows the arrest of Ferdinand Behr, an innocent bystander.

Modern scholars concur that the photograph does not depict the arrest of Gavrilo Princip, but rather one of his friends who had no involvement in the assassination. According to the research conducted by Austrian photographic historian Dr. Anton Holzer, Ferdinand Behr (also known as Ferdo Ber), was caught up in the wave of arrests that followed the shooting. German historian Dr. Christoph Hamann, in his article published in the academic journal of historical photography, Fotogeschichte, wrote that Ferdinand Behr was a school friend of Princip from Sarajevo. When Behr witnessed Princip being targeted by an enraged crowd after the crime, he attempted to protect his friend, unaware that Princip was the actual assassin. As a result, Behr himself was arrested and taken to the police station on suspicion of being involved in the assassination.

The most famous photograph of the aftermath of the Sarajevo assassination is commonly believed to show the manhandling of Gavrilo Princip. In fact it shows the arrest of an Innocent bystander, Ferdinand Behr, during the confusion which followed the killing of the royal couple.

— Christopher Andrew, Professor of Modern and Contemporary History, former Chair of the Faculty of History at Cambridge University, June 2018

According to Sunday Times journalist David James Smith, the young man was photographed on the way to the police station. Smith asserts that there is no authentic photograph of Princip's arrest and confirms that the picture actually shows the apprehension of Ferdinand Behr.

British journalist Tim Butcher spent three years researching Princip's life, from 2011 to 2014. Upon completing his research, Butcher confirmed that the individual apprehended in the image was Ferdinand Behr. Butcher referred to the photograph as "the famous picture that so many historians, journalists and archivists . . . wrongly believed to show the actual assassin being led away. A statement written by Behr in 1930, more than a decade after the photograph was taken, expressed his surprise at being mistakenly identified as Princip, Behr highlighted the difference in physical appearance between himself and Princip, stating that Princip was much slighter and shorter in stature..

I saw the photograph that supposedly showed Princip brought to prison by guards. To my great surprise, I saw myself being led away by the police. The photographer had probably caught the moment when I was taken to prison . . . Incidentally, anyone who knew Princip can easily see that, since he was small, whereas I was tall and thin back then, as I am now.

— Ferdinand Behr (Ferdo Ber) statement in Pregled, September 1930

According to Christopher Clark, Regius Professor of History at the University of Cambridge, given the technological development of photography in 1914, if somebody had managed to get a snapshot like this of the arrest of Princip, "it would be nothing short of a miracle". Clark explained that, a couple of days after the assassination and the capture of Gavrilo Princip, the Police tipped off the photographer about an upcoming arrest. To make a large profit from its syndication, the photographer subsequently decided to sell the image captioned as "The arrest of Gavrilo Princip".

Since the statement of Ferdinand Behr in 1930, it has been known that the person arrested in the photo was not the assassin Princip, but his school friend Behr. For the Institut für Österreichkunde (Institute for Austrian Studies), fifty years after the event, after Vladimir Dedijer published his book, the identity of the subject was confirmed as "an acquaintance of Princip called Ferdo Behr".

Other sources identified the subject as Nedeljko Čabrinović, an error that most probably originated with the Österreichs Illustrierte Zeitung or with postcards publisher Philipp Rubel, who in 1914, both erroneously identified the subject as "bomb thrower Čabrinović". The photo agency Getty Images sells a few versions of the photograph of the arrest, one of them with the following caption: "The arrested man previously thought to be Gavrilo Princip . . . is now thought to be one of his six co-conspirators Nedeljko Cabrinovic". After purchasing the image from Getty Images, Life Magazine published it in LIFE Secret Societies with the caption: "Cabrinovic is arrested, a photo long erroneously thought to depict Princip". Another version for sale by Getty is captioned : "Picture taken on June 28 1914 of Serb terrorist Gavrilo Princip (2ndR) upon his arrest after the assassination of Archduke Franz Ferdinand".

=== Author of the photograph ===
The Viennese center for historical photography, Photoinstitut Bonartes, identified the author as Austrian photographer Walter Tausch, the owner a studio called Photographische Kunstanstalt Sarajevo (Sarajevo Photographic Art Institute) on Kulovica Street in Sarajevo. Tausch moved to Sarajevo on behalf of the Austro-Hungarian government in 1910 and immediately opened his studio. (Note: Walter Tausch was one of the few Austrians who stayed in Sarajevo after WWI.) Tausch was the professional photographer who had captured the arrival of the Archduke and the Duchess in Ilidža, on their arrival into Bosnia at the train station, the greeting of the Duchess Hohenberg by the head of the state at Hotel Bosna in Ilidža, the departure of the couple from the city hall of Sarajevo after the first bomb attack, a few minutes before the fateful revolver attack on 28 June 1914, the journey through the streets in an automobile, including the scene of the first (bomb) attack by Nedeljko Čabrinović, and right after the assassination attempt, the escorting of the murderer Gavrilo Princip and his comrades to prison. Walter Tausch is widely credited as the professional photographer who took pictures at the scene of the assassination. Fotogeschichte, names Tausch as president of the "Association of Professional Photographers" from Bosnia and Herzegovina and that his professional reputation explains why he was able to secure an accreditation as an official photographer for the duration of the Archduke's visit to Sarajevo, and why he is most likely the author of the image of the arrest. According to Christoph Hamann the photographer of the canonical photo of the arrest of the alleged assassin was known by name since the Österreichs Illustrierte Zeitung credited Walter Tausch in its 5 July 1914 issue.

In some sources, the names Charles Trampus or Philipp Rubel are mentioned as photographers of the picture. In 1971 the postcard was presented in issue 3 of the German monthly magazine Foto und Film-Prisma with the following legend: "Philipp Rubel: Capture of Gavrilo Princip after the assassination attempt on Archduke Franz Ferdinand, Sarajevo, June 28, 1914". In 1983 American photo historian Helmut Gernsheim published the picture with the same legend in his book "History of Photography"'. According to Holzer, Charles Trampus was the owner of Paris-based photo agency "Press Agency Trampus" and not a photographer while Philipp Rubel owned a postcard publishing company that only sold photography. Holzer credits the author as an anonymous photographer from Sarajevo who sold the picture to Charles Trampus. Rubel acquired the rights of reproduction from Trampus, for Austria-Hungary and the German Empire, and published the photo as a postcard with the mention "Property and Publisher Philipp Rubel, Vienna" printed on the back. This information is available in the photography database of the Albertina Museum in Vienna.

Bonartes Photoinstitut found records of a legal case brought by Philipp Rubel against Österreichische Zeitungsdruckerei-AG, a publishing house in Vienna, that printed and distributed postcards without permission. The identity of the photographer Walter Tausch and the acquisition of the rights by the publisher Rubel as well as the complaint procedure against Österreichische Zeitungsdruckerei-AG have been in public records since 15 January 1915, when the court hearing took place in Vienna. In the legal proceedings, the printer was acquitted because the image was not a portrait but a "situational picture" and no corresponding reservation was noted on the prints. The data was published within the report and reported in the Neue Wiener Tagblatt, a popular Viennese daily newspaper, of 16 January 1915. According to Timm Starl author of Lexikon zur Fotografie in Österreich 1839 bis 1945 (Lexicon on photography in Austria from 1839 to 1945), the Austrian photography database, a short version of the court proceedings is available in the database "Bibliography on Photography in Austria" on the Albertina Museum website and accessible since 21 December 1998.

Other sources like the Croatian History Museum of Zagreb claim that the author was an amateur photographer named Milos Oberajger who had found himself between the policemen and the assassin on the day of the assassination. According to the museum a written explanation in Hungarian was found on the back of the photograph. Getty images sells a version of the image with the following credit: "The arrest of Nedeljko Cabrinovic . . . captured by amateur photographer Milos Oberajger" giving the source of the image as Topical Press Agency, a British photo agency established in 1903 and dissolved in 1957. A 2006 book called "Terrorism Essential Primary Sources" credits the same person as photographer, giving the source as the Croatian History Museum in Zagreb.

Other photographers like Carl Seebald, who was running a photo agency in Vienna, also sold the photo to the press, allegedly showing the assassin, under their own name adding to the confusion.

=== Publication and repercussions ===
On 5 July 1914, a week after the assassination, the Austrian weekly newspaper Wiener Bilder published the photograph on its front page, allegedly showing the Sarajevo assassin with the caption Die Ermordung des Thronfolgers und seiner Gemahlin in Sarajevo. Die Festnahme des Mörders Princip (The assassination of the heir to the throne and his wife in Sarajevo. The arrest of the murderer Princip) without crediting the photographer. The same day, a Viennese daily, Österreichs Illustrierte Zeitung, ran it with the caption "The bomb thrower Čabrinović“. A few days later, on 9 July 1914, Die Hamburger Woche No. 28, the illustrated magazine of the Hamburger Nachrichten, published it as “The arrest of the assassin in Sarajevo" and credited Trampus as the photographer. Also on 9 July 1914 the largest magazine in the country Das Interessante Blatt also ran the picture with the caption: Die Festnahme des 20 jährigen Gymnasiasten Gavro Princip, des Mörders des Thronfolgerpaares (The arrest of the 20-year-old high school student Gavro Princip, the murderer of the heir to the throne).

In 2005 the Encyclopedia of Twentieth-Century Photography published the image as "the critical moment that would trigger the war, captured in a photograph on the cover of the 9 July 1914 issue of Die Hanzburger Woche showing the arrest of Serbian nationalist Gavrilo Princip after he had shot the Archduke Ferdinand, heir to the Austro-Hungarian throne". The scene quickly became famous after postcards were made of it, reprinted again in newspapers around the world, and to this day also on book covers, university-level textbooks and in museums with the same caption claiming that the arrested person was the murderer Princip.

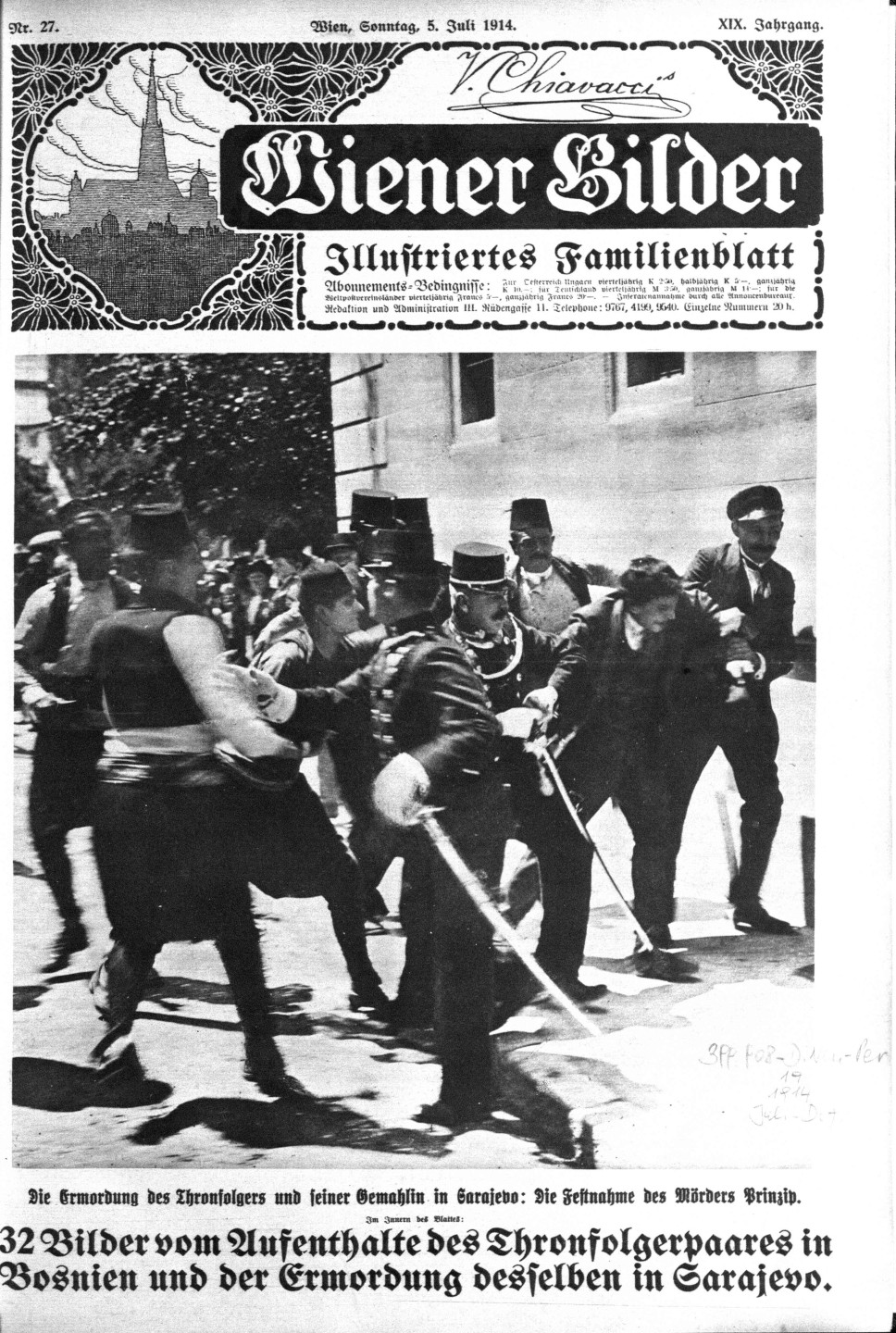
Austrian weekly Wiener Bilder, a magazine supplement featuring the photograph captioned as the arrest of Gavrilo Princip, 5 July 1914.

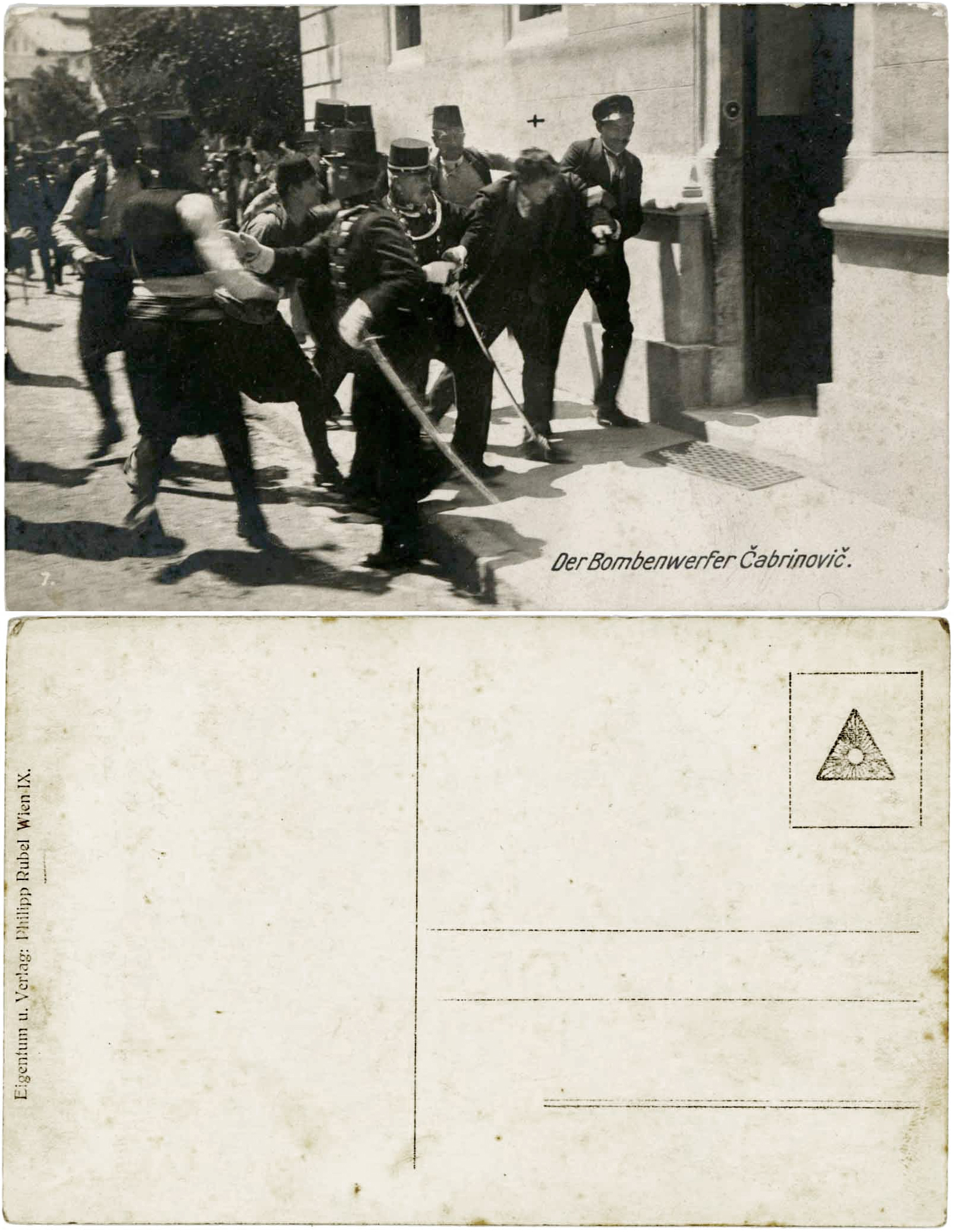
Postcard published by Philipp Rubel, printed with a caption identifying the suspect as "bomb thrower Čabrinović".

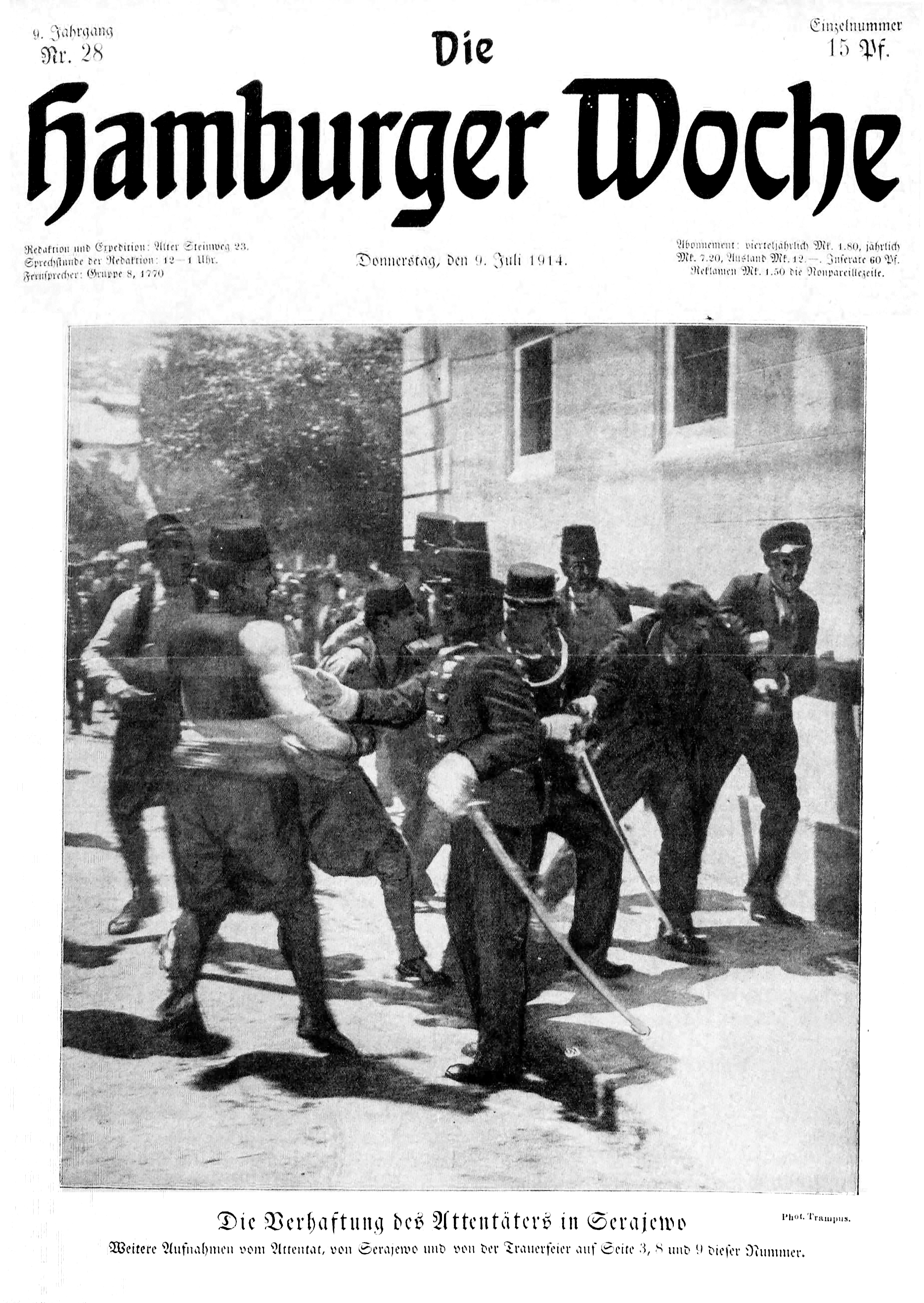
Die Hamburger Woche with photo credit Trampus, 9 July 1914.

On 16 June 2012, Austrian photography historian Anton Holzer published his research about the photograph of the arrest, in the Austrian daily Die Press, under the headline "The murderer who wasn't one". Holzer found out that doubts about the subject being Princip had existed from the start, but once the image went into circulation, the story could no longer be stopped and to this day, the person arrested in the photo continues to be depicted as the assassin of Franz Ferdinand. According to Butcher the image fit so well the narrative of the desperate assassin that countless historians, reporters, broadcasters and film-makers have continue to claim that the subject of the photograph was Princip. Christopher Clark calls it an "egregious mistake", since there is no photograph of the moment of the attack itself, the arrest photo ultimately had the status of a media substitute. The image became an icon of the 20th century after being republished as the arrest of the man who fired the shot that started the First World War.

Hans B. von Sothen, author of Photos make politics, Fakes and Manipulation, a book on the subject of photo manipulation and photo forgery, concludes that even though the photo does not depict the assassin and there is no photo of the arrest of the actual assassin, this photo remains one of the most fascinating in world history. Christoph Hamann sees it as a visual symbol that kept the assassination and the narrative of Serbia's political responsibility in the long-term memory.
