= Michael Obert =

German book author and journalist (born 1966)

Michael Obert (born 1966) is a German book author and journalist who has been compared with the likes of Bruce Chatwin, Jon Krakauer and Ryszard Kapuściński. His debut movie Song from the Forest was honored with the Award for Best Feature-Length Documentary at the International Documentary Film Festival Amsterdam 2013. In 2016 Song from the Forest was considered for the 88th Academy Awards.

Obert is currently based in Berlin.

== Journalism ==
As a journalist Michael Obert reports mainly from Africa and the Middle East and writes for a wide range of prestigious periodicals in Germany, Switzerland and Austria, such as Sueddeutsche Zeitung Magazin, GEO, Zeit Magazin, Die Zeit, Frankfurter Allgemeine Zeitung. Obert´s work is also published by international media like Sunday Times Magazine, Courrier International, GQ France, The Journal (New York), Dagens Næringsliv (Oslo) and Himal Southasian (Kathmandu).

== Literature ==
In his travelogue Regenzauber (On the River of Gods), published by German National Geographic Editions, he describes traveling for seven months on Africa’s third longest river, the Niger, from its source in the rainforest of Guinea, 2,600 miles through the Sahel and Southern Sahara, into the mouth of the Niger at the Bay of Benin.

In Die Raender der Welt (The Edges of the World), a selection of Obert’s finest literary travel writing, he explores 25 lost locations often overlooked by travelers so far, including war zones like Afghanistan, Sudan, Nigeria, but also forgotten paradises such as the Cook Islands, Papua New Guinea, and Bhutan.

In Chatwins Guru und ich (Chatwin´s Guru and Me) Obert, a self-described modern nomad, follows in the footsteps of the nearly hundred-year-old writing vagabond, Patrick Leigh Fermor. To find this mentor, Obert travels from Berlin via Vienna to Bratislava, through Hungary, Serbia, Rumania, Bulgaria, Macedonia and Albania before reaching the southern Peloponnese. Along the way, he gets to know what is, for him, an unfamiliar part of the world. His encounters become part of a portrait of Eastern Europe that is as personal as it is poetic.

Michael Obert´s literature is not yet published in English language.

== Film ==
Song from the Forest, Michael Obert´s debut movie, tells the story of American Louis Sarno who has lived among the Bayaka pygmies (also Aka people) in the central African rainforest for 25 years and travels with his son, 13-year-old pygmy boy Samedi, to New York City.

The film premiered at the International Documentary Film Festival Amsterdam 2013 where it was honored with the Award for Best Feature-Length Documentary. The film also won the 2014 Grand Prix at Planete+Doc International Film Festival in Warsaw and was nominated for the Golden Eye Award for Best International Documentary Film at the Zurich Film Festival 2014. In 2016 Song from the Forest was considered for the 88th Academy Awards.

== Bibliography (selection) ==
- Chatwins Guru und ich. Meine Suche nach Patrick Leigh Fermor (2009 Malik Verlag), ISBN 978-3-89029-371-4
- Die Ränder der Welt. Patagonien, Timbuktu, Bhutan& Co. (2008 Malik Verlag) ISBN 978-3-89029-353-0
- Regenzauber. Auf dem Fluss der Götter (2003 Droemer Verlag) ISBN 978-3-426-27315-9

== Filmography ==
- 2013: Song from the Forest, written and directed by Michael Obert - Documentary film, world premiere: International Documentary Film Festival Amsterdam 2013.

== Awards (selection) ==
- 2018: European Press Prize, Distinguished Reporting Award for The Human Catcher
- 2017: Pulitzer Center on Crisis Reporting, International Journalism Grant
- 2017: Amnesty International Media Award for Human Rights for The Curse of the White Skin (Der Fluch der weißen Haut)
- 2016: Considered for the 88th Academy Awards with Song from the Forest
- 2016: Shortlist Journalist of the Year, European Diversity Awards London 2016
- 2015: German Documentary Film Award for Song from the Forest
- 2015: Nominated for European Press Prize, Distinguished Writing Award, with Boko Haram. The rise, beliefs and power of Africa’s most feared terrorist group
- 2014: Grand Prix, Planete+Doc International Film Festival Warsaw for Song from the Forest
- 2014: Nominated for Henri Nannen Award
- 2014: Hansel Mieth Prize
- 2013: IDFA Award for Best Feature-Length Documentary for Song from the Forest, International Documentary Film Festival Amsterdam 2013
- 2013: Otto Brenner Award for Critical Journalism
- 2013: Lighthouse Award for Outstanding Journalistic Work
- 2013: Shortlisted for European Press Prize, News Reporting Award
- 2013: Hansel Mieth Prize
- 2012: German Reporter Prize
- 2012: Hansel Mieth Prize
- 2011: Hansel Mieth Prize
- 2009: Sangam House Writers´ Residency, Pondicherry, India
- 2009: Hansel Mieth Prize
- 2008: Ledig House Writers´ Residency, New York
- 2008: Herbert Breiter Scholarship, Greece
- 2005: Globetrotter Literature Award
