= Louis Sarno =

American-Central African musicologist and author (1954–2017)

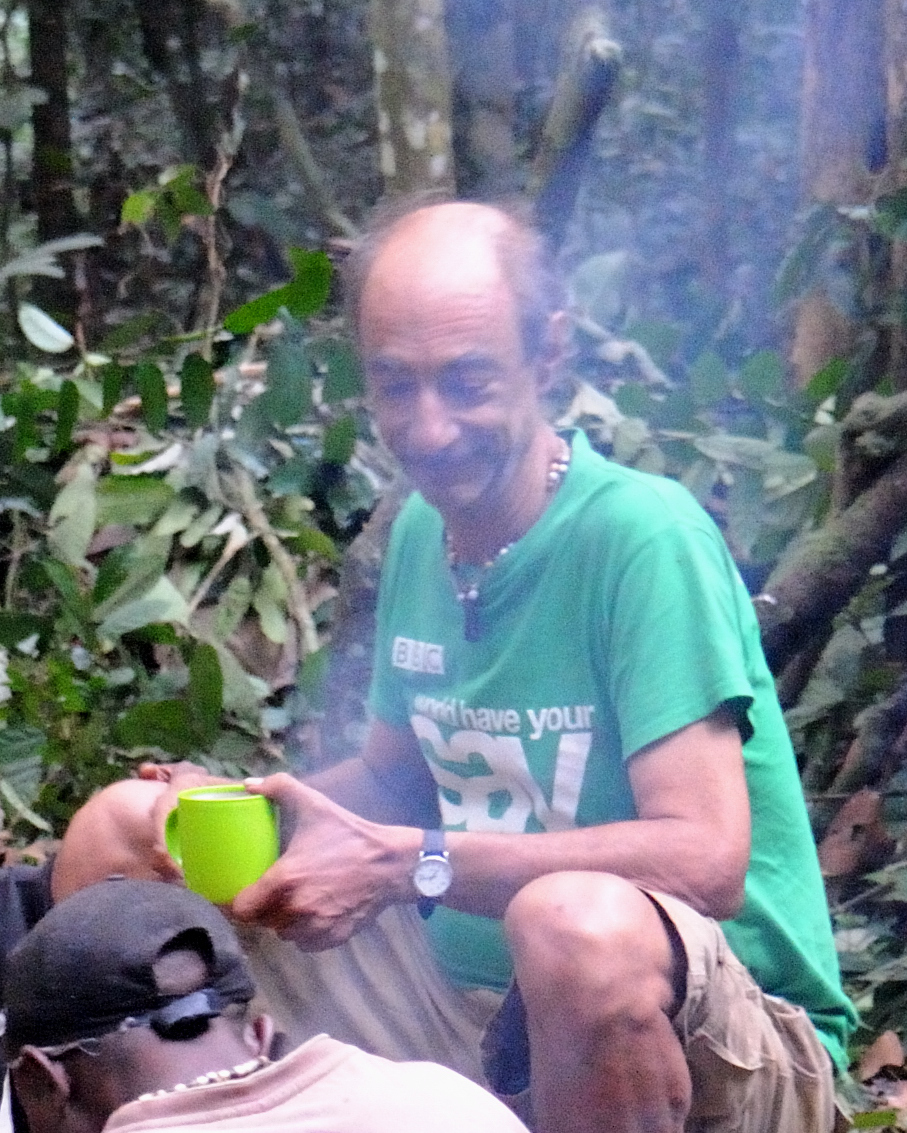
- Born: July 3, 1954; Newark, New Jersey, United States
- Died: April 1, 2017 (aged 62); Cliffside Park, New Jersey

Louis Sarno (July 3, 1954 – April 1, 2017) was an American-Central African adventurer, recorder of folk music and author. In the mid-1980s until about 2016 he made field recordings of the music of a Bayaka (BaAka) pygmy forest people while living among them in the Central African Republic. Sarno lived in the CAR for more than 30 years, and held dual citizenship there and in the United States.

== Life ==
Louis Sarno was born and raised in Newark, New Jersey to a second-generation Italian-American family. He attended Northwestern University, where he became friends with filmmaker Jim Jarmusch. Sarno transferred to Rutgers, where he graduated with a degree in English. He did postgraduate work in literature at the University of Iowa for three years, but did not complete his degree. He and his then-wife, Wanda, moved to Amsterdam.

While living in Amsterdam, Sarno was introduced to Bayaka music in the 1980s, through a radio broadcast. Although without formal training in anthropology or ethnomusicology, he became interested in recording music of inhabitants of the rainforest. After an unsuccessful attempt to enter the rainforest through Sudan in 1983, due to the Second Sudanese War, he entered the Central African Republic through its capital, Bangui. He began living with a Bayaka community near the Dzanga Ndoki National Park and the town of Bayanga, Sangha-Mbaéré, Central African Republic. He was a permanent resident of the community from around 1988. Sarno later helped with founding a new village farther from Bayanga, called Yandoumbe. He separated from his wife in the early years of his time in the CAR.

While living in Yandoumbe, he eventually came to serve in the roles of "village doctor, schoolteacher, advocate, interpreter, archivist, writer and fixer". He was able to improve water supplies and latrine facilities, and became known within the community for dispensing imported medicines. He earned money through irregular jobs. He became initiated into the ejengi and bojobe traditions.

Louis Sarno had three long-term relationships with Bayaka women, "with long, unattached spells in between", and adopted two sons, one of whom was named Samedi. Sarno had no biological children. While living with the Bayaka, Sarno contracted a number of tropical diseases, including hepatitis B and D, leprosy, loa loa, malaria and typhus. By 2015, he had cirrhosis. He was granted CAR citizenship in 2005.

Sarno returned to the United States for three months in 2013 following the outbreak of the Central African Republic civil war, after the military Séléka targeted him over rumors that he knew of deposits of the fictional red mercury in the region. He later wrote an essay on his experiences around the escape, titled "Flight (From Paradise)".

In late 2016, Sarno returned to New Jersey, seeking medical care. Sarno died on April 1, 2017, in Cliffside Park, New Jersey, due to complications of liver ailments.

== Publications and media ==
=== Recordings ===
By 2015, Sarno had recorded more than 1,400 hours of Bayaka music and soundscapes. The recordings are now held by the Pitt Rivers Museum at Oxford University, who have digitized his collection, and Wild Sanctuary, an archive of indigenous music, stories and natural soundscapes. The polyphonic singing of the Bayaka was added to UNESCO's Representative List of the Intangible Cultural Heritage of Humanity in 2008.

He and his collaborator Bernie Krause combined recordings of Bayaka music with sounds of their surrounding environment into a two-CD/book package entitled Bayaka: The Extraordinary Music of the Babenzélé Pygmies (Ellipsis Arts).

In the late 1990s two albums, Music of the Bayaka, Volume I and II, produced by Bernie Krause were released under Wild Sanctuary, an archive that holds additional music and natural soundscape recordings by Sarno.

=== Other media ===
He documented some of his experiences in his memoir, Song from the Forest: My Life Among the Pygmies (1993), which Geoff Wisner included in his survey work A Basket of Leaves: 99 Books That Capture the Spirit of Africa. In later years, Sarno expressed dissatisfaction with the book, feeling it did not accurately describe Bayaka life as he later came to know it. By 2015, he had written two other memoir-length pieces, neither of which had been published.

The documentary film Song from the Forest, by German director Michael Obert, tells Sarno's life story. The film premiered at the International Documentary Film Festival Amsterdam 2013 where it was honored with the Award for Best Feature-Length Documentary. A movie based on Sarno's life called Oka! was released in 2011 (in the Aka language, oka means "listen").
