= Walter Tausch =

Austrian photographer and photojournalist

- Born: Austria-Hungary
- Occupation: Photojournalist
- Years active: c. 1910–1919
- Known for: Photographs of the Assassination of Archduke Franz Ferdinand of Austria and its aftermath
- Notable work: Photograph of the arrest of a suspect in Sarajevo (1914)

Walter Tausch was an Austrian photojournalist active in the early 20th century, noted for documenting the Assassination of Archduke Franz Ferdinand of Austria in Sarajevo on 28 June 1914. His photographs, including images taken shortly before the shooting and of the arrest of a suspect initially believed to be Gavrilo Princip, were widely circulated. Tausch operated a photographic studio in Sarajevo from 1910, served as president of the Association of Professional Photographers in Bosnia and Herzegovina, and remained in the city after the First World War. His work is preserved in the History Museum of Bosnia and Herzegovina.

== Career ==
In 1910, several years after Bosnia and Herzegovina came under Austro-Hungarian rule, Tausch relocated to Sarajevo. He established the Photographische Kunstanstalt Sarajevo, neben Apollotheater (Sarajevo Photographic Art Institute, next to the Apollo Theatre) on Kulovica Street. Shortly afterwards, he was elected president of the Association of Professional Photographers in Bosnia and Herzegovina, contributing to the development of the local photographic industry.

=== Assassination of Archduke Franz Ferdinand ===
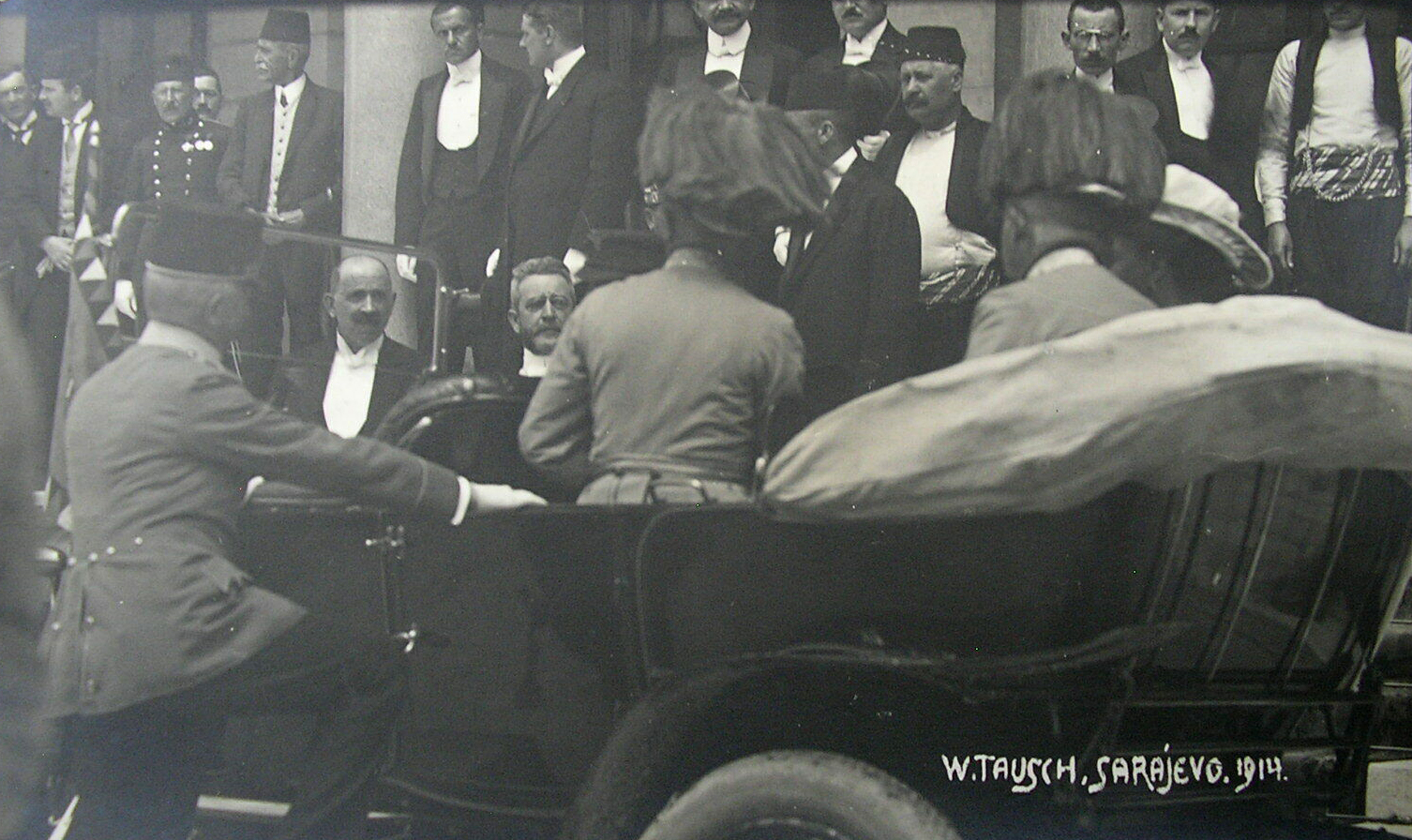
The Royal car in Sarajevo on 28 June 1914; one of the images captured by Walter Tausch during the visit of Archduke Franz Ferdinand of Austria and Sophie, Duchess of Hohenberg.

Tausch was commissioned as an official photographer during the Archduke’s visit to Sarajevo on 28 June 1914. He photographed the couple’s arrival in Ilidža, occupied Bosnia, their reception at the train station, and the greeting of the Duchess by the head of state at Hotel Bosna. He also recorded their departure from Sarajevo City Hall after the first bomb attack, the motorcade’s route through the city, and the scene of the bombing by Nedeljko Čabrinović. Minutes later, he captured images of the arrest and escort to prison of Gavrilo Princip and his accomplices.

Tausch is widely credited as the professional photographer who documented the assassination. His accreditation as official photographer enabled him to produce the well-known image of the arrest of a suspect in Sarajevo, first published a week later in Wiener Bilder and credited to him on the 5 July 1914 cover of Österreichs Illustrierte Zeitung. He was one of the few Austrians to remain in Sarajevo after WWI, and in 1919 he photographed the city’s old bazaar, adding to the visual record of Sarajevo’s early 20th-century history.

== Sources ==
- Wade, J. (2020). Cameras at War: Photo Gear that Captured 100 Years of Conflict - From Crimea to Korea. Pen & Sword Military. ISBN 978-1-5267-6013-5.
- "Wechselvolle Geschichten" [Changing stories]. Photoinstitut Bonartes (in German).
- Christoph Hamann. "Das Attentat von Sarajevo 1914: Visuelle Strategien der Zeitgenössischen Bildpresse Österreichs" [The Assassination Attempt in Sarajevo 1914: Visual Strategies of the Contemporary Austrian Picture Press]. Fotogeschichte (in German).
- "Visual Archive Southeastern Europe". VASE. 1964-09-06.
- Agstner, R. (2013). 1914: Das andere Lesebuch zum 1. Weltkrieg. Unbekannte Dokumente der österreichisch-ungarischen Diplomatie. Forschungen zur Geschichte des Österreichischen Auswärtigen Dienstes (in German). Lit. ISBN 978-3-643-50530-9.
- "Historijski Muzej BiH". Historijski Muzej BiH. 1944-05-25.
