= A Basket of Leaves =

Essay collection by Geoff Wisner

A Basket of Leaves: 99 Books That Capture the Spirit of Africa
- Cover of first edition (paperback)
- Author: Geoffrey B. Wisner
- Language: English
- Subject: Literary criticism
- Published: 2007 (Jacana Media)
- Publication place: South Africa
- Media type: Print (paperback)
- Pages: 289
- ISBN: 978-1-77009-206-8 (first edition)
- OCLC: 161792466
- LC Class: PL8010 .W57 2007

A Basket of Leaves is a collection of 54 essays by Geoff Wisner, each of which examines one or more books about a different African country. The collection was published by Jacana Media in 2007.

The authors of the selected books are (variously) African, American, West Indian, and European. Some of the authors are black, and others are white. Some of the books are fiction, and others are non-fiction; 28 of them were authored or co-authored by women. The selected works were originally published in Arabic, English, French, German, Polish, Portuguese, and other languages.

== Reviewed works ==
Work	Year published	Author	Author nationality	Country
The Sheltering Sky	1949	Paul Bowles	United States	Algeria
The Savage Night (Note: Originally published in French as La Nuit sauvage.)	1995	Mohammed Dib	Algeria	Algeria
Algerian White (Note: Originally published in French as Le Blanc de l’Algérie.)	1996	Assia Djebar	Algeria	Algeria
Mayombe	1979	Pepetela	Angola	Angola
Another Day of Life (Note: Originally published in Polish as Jeszcze dzień życia.)	1976	Ryszard Kapuscinski	Poland	Angola
The Viceroy of Ouidah	1980	Bruce Chatwin	United Kingdom	Benin
When Rain Clouds Gather	1968	Bessie Head	South Africa / Botswana	Botswana
Whites	1986	Norman Rush	United States	Botswana
Of Water and the Spirit	1994	Malidoma Patrice Somé	Burkina Faso	Burkina Faso
The True Sources of the Nile	2003	Sarah Stone	United States	Burundi
Mission to Kala (Note: Originally published in French as Mission terminée.)	1957	Mongo Beti	Cameroon	Cameroon
The Fortunate Isles	1989	Basil Davidson	United Kingdom	Cape Verde
Song from the Forest	2015	Louis Sarno	United States / CAR	Central African Republic
Komoon! Capturing the Chad Elephant	1953	Heinrich Oberjohann	Germany	Chad
Last of the Pirates	1994	Samantha Weinberg	United Kingdom	Comoros
