= Barry Hewlett =

American anthropologist

Barry S. Hewlett is Professor of Anthropology at Washington State University, earned his A.B. and M.A. degrees at California State University, Chico and his Ph.D. from the University of California at Santa Barbara. He is best known for his study of the Aka (Pygmy tribe) people of Central Africa. He has worked with his wife, Dr. Bonnie Hewlett, who concentrates her study on the Aka women and health issues. His publications include six books, 24 chapters in books and 27 scholarly journal articles.

His research interests currently include the cultural influence of the Aka and Ngandu on infant development, the cultural contexts of various tropical diseases, the impact of new African tropical forest parks and reserves on the local people, and cultural transmission and biocultural evolution. His interests in infectious diseases include local cultural models of disease, incorporating anthropological approaches to disease control efforts, and emerging diseases including Ebola.

Hewlett published a book chapter about Ebola in 2003 (Culture and Ebola in Northern Uganda), followed by two scholarly articles about Ebola in 2005 (Providing care and facing death: nurses and Ebola in Central Africa; Medical anthropology and Ebola in Congo: Cultural models and humanistic care), co-authored a book in 2008 on the subject (Culture and Politics: The Anthropology of an Emerging Disease), and another book chapter on Ebola in 2010 (Haemorrhagic Fevers: Narrative, Politics, and Pathways).

== Books ==
- Hunter-Gatherers of the Congo Basin: Cultures, Histories and Biology of African Pygmies. Transaction Books, 2014 (editor).
- Ebola, Culture and Politics: The Anthropology of an Emerging Disease. Wadsworth Centage, 2008 (co-author).
- Hunter-Gatherer Childhoods: Evolutionary, Developmental and Cultural Perspectives. Transaction/Aldine, 2005 (co-author).
- Diverse Contexts of Human Infancy. Prentice Hall, 1996, (author).
- Father-Child Relations: Cultural and Biocultural Contexts. Aldine, 1992 (editor).
- Intimate Fathers: The Nature and Context of Aka Pygmy Paternal Infant Care. University of Michigan Press, 1991 (author).

== Articles ==
- Providing care and facing death:nurses and Ebola in Central Africa. Transcultural Nursing, 2005, 16, 289-297 (co-author).
- Weaning and parent-offspring conflict in Fofi foragers and farmers. Current Anthropology, 2005, 46-50 (co-author).
- Culture and Ebola in Northern Uganda. Emerging Infectious Diseases, 2003, 9, 1242-1248 (co-author).
- Semes and genes in Africa, Current Anthropology, 2002, 43, 313-321 (co-author).
- The contexts of female hunting in Central Africa, American Anthropologist, 2001, 103(2), 1024-1040 (c-author).
