= Das interessante Blatt =

Austrian newspaper (1882–1939)

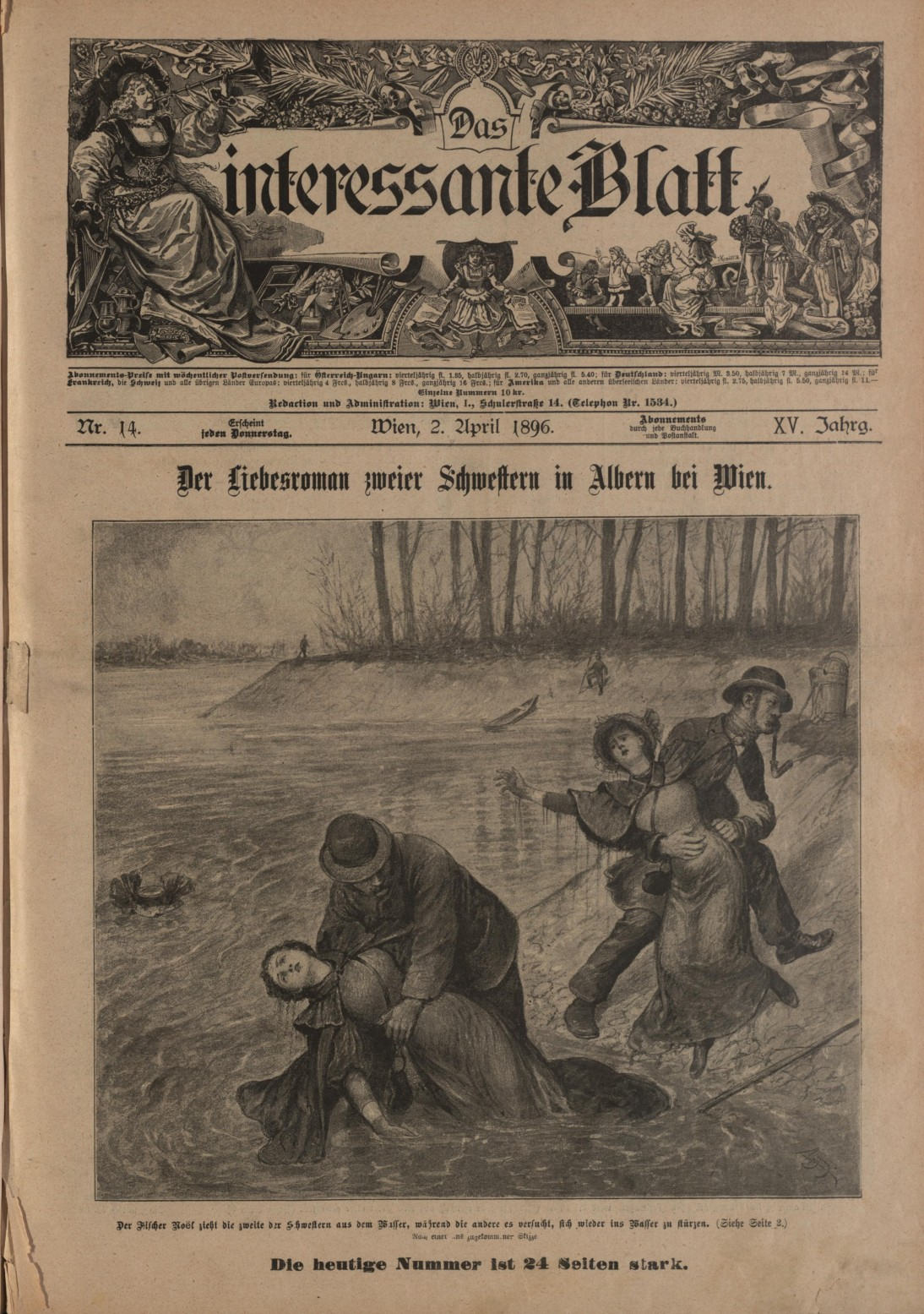
Title page of the first issue

Das Interessante Blatt was an Austrian magazine which appeared weekly from 1882 to 1939. A supplement of the newspaper appeared under the title Wiener Bilder, their successor newspaper was the Wiener Illustrierte.

== Bibliography ==
- Helmut W. Lang (editor): Österreichische Retrospektive Bibliographie (ORBI). Reihe 2: Österreichische Zeitungen 1492–1945. Volume 2: Helmut W. Lang, Ladislaus Lang, Wilma Buchinger: Bibliographie der österreichischen Zeitungen 1621–1945. A–M. Bearbeitet an der Österreichischen Nationalbibliothek. K. G. Saur, Munich 2003, ISBN 3-598-23384-1, p. 378
