= Aka people =

Nomadic Mbenga pygmy people

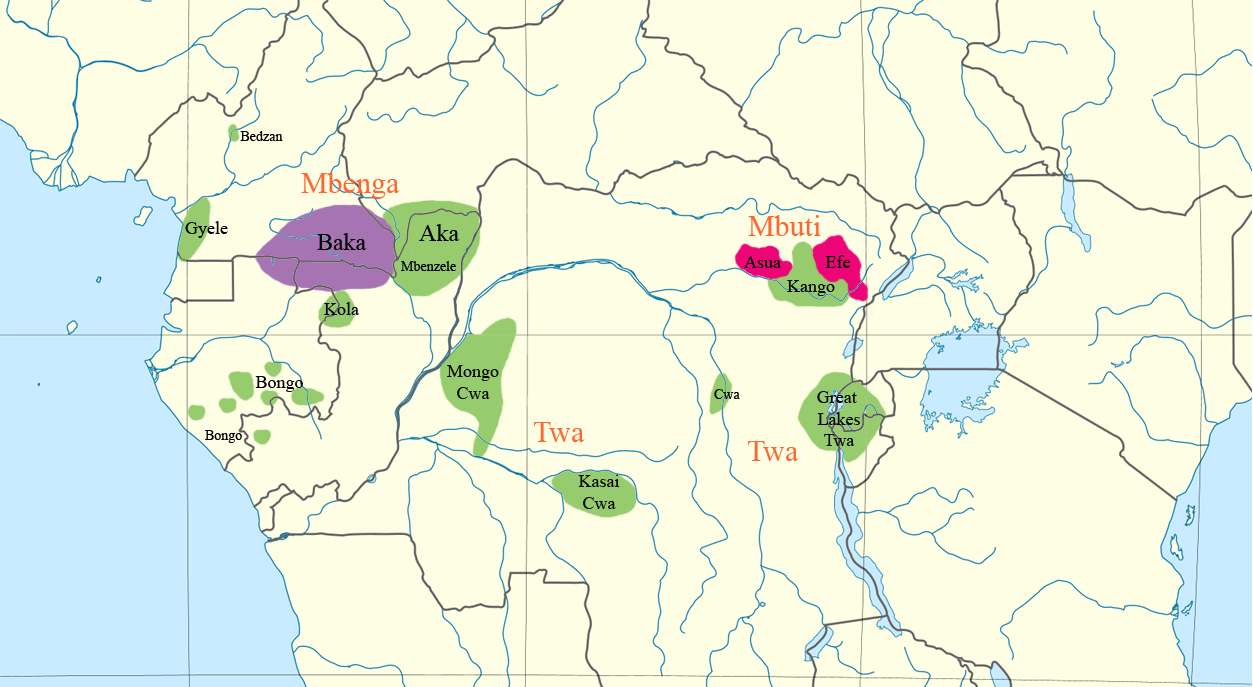
The distribution of Congo Pygmies and their languages according to Bahuchet (2006). The southern Twa are not shown.

The Aka or Biaka (also Bayaka, Babenzele) are a nomadic Mbenga pygmy people. They live in south-western Central African Republic and in northern Republic of the Congo. They are related to the Baka people of Cameroon, Gabon, northern Congo, and southwestern Central African Republic.

Unlike the Mbuti pygmies of the eastern Congo (who speak only the language of the tribes with whom they are affiliated), the Aka speak their own language along with whichever of the approximately 15 Bantu peoples they are affiliated.

In 2003, the oral traditions of the Aka were proclaimed one of the Masterpieces of the Oral and Intangible Heritage of Humanity by UNESCO. They were featured in the July 1995 National Geographic article "Ndoki: the Last Place on Earth", and a 3-part TV series.

== Society ==
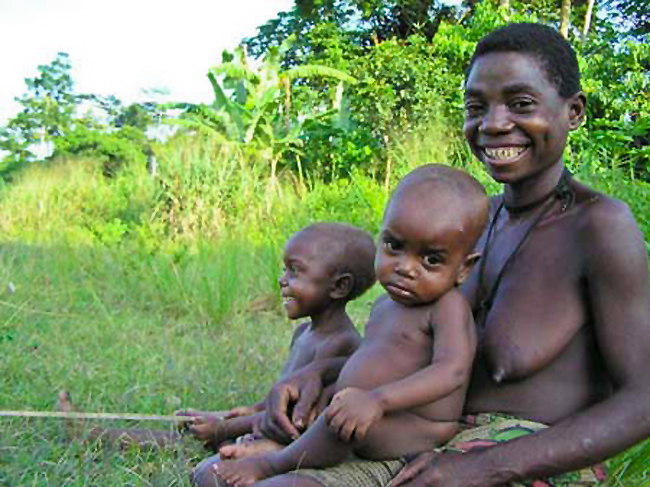
A family from a Ba Aka pygmy village in the Democratic Republic of the Congo in 2006.

The Aka are traditionally hunter-gatherers whose society is characterised by cooperation, extensive food sharing and relatively little formal hierarchy..

=== Social organisation ===
Camps usually consist of several related families who share food, childcare and many daily activities. Decisions affecting the group are generally reached through discussion and consensus rather than by the authority of a single leader.

Food sharing is a central feature of Aka society. Meat, fish, honey and other forest resources are commonly distributed among families within the camp, reinforcing social ties and helping to reduce material inequalities. Individuals may gain respect because of their hunting skills, knowledge of the forest or ritual experience, but these qualities do not normally confer permanent authority over other members of the community.

A traditional hunter-gatherer society, the Aka have a varied diet that includes at least 63 plant species, 28 species of game and 20 species of insects, in addition to nuts, fruit, honey, mushrooms and roots. Some Aka also cultivate small seasonal crops, although most agricultural products are obtained through exchange with neighbouring Bantu-speaking farming communities, collectively known as the Ngandu.

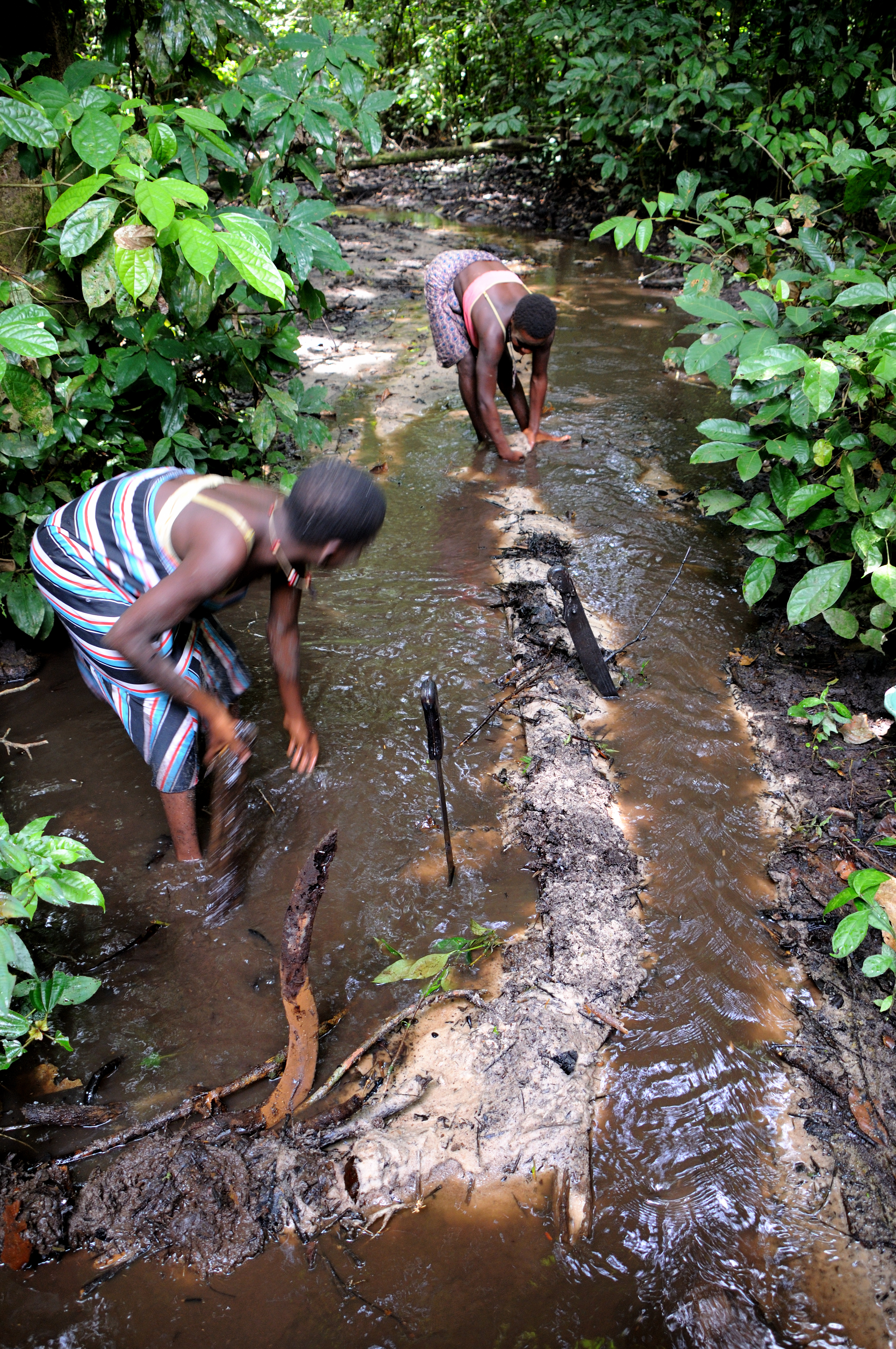
BaAka fishing in a forest stream in the Central African Republic.

Through this exchange, the Aka obtain manioc, plantains, yams, taro, maize, cucumbers, squash, okra, papaya, mangoes, pineapples, palm oil and rice in return for bushmeat, honey and other forest products. These long-standing relationships have shaped the economy of Aka communities throughout much of their history.

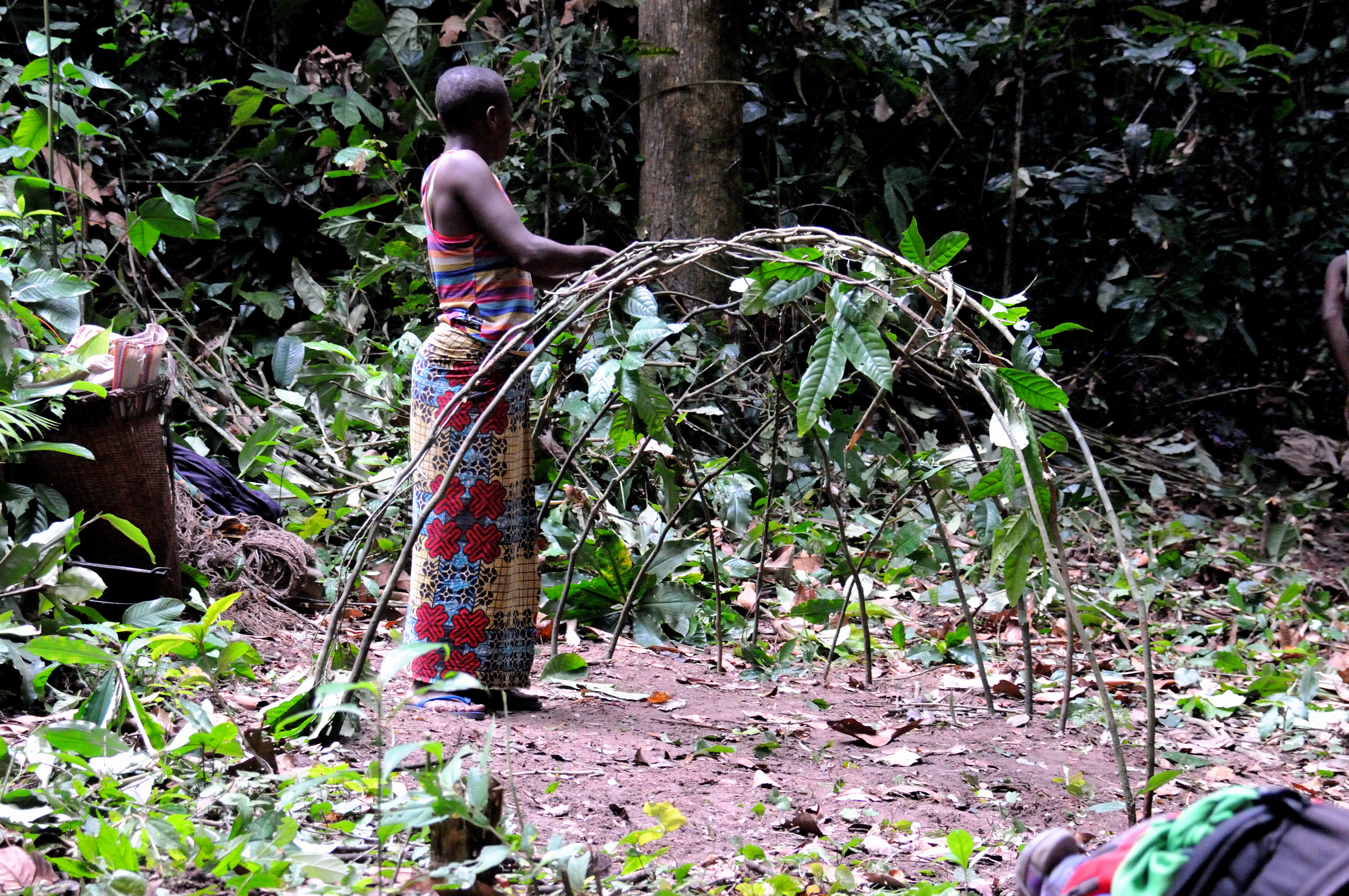
BaAka constructing a traditional forest hut in the Central African Republic.

Because hunting, butchering and the preparation of bushmeat involve frequent contact with wild animals, the Aka have been reported to show relatively high levels of exposure to Ebola virus, although this does not necessarily correspond to high rates of disease.

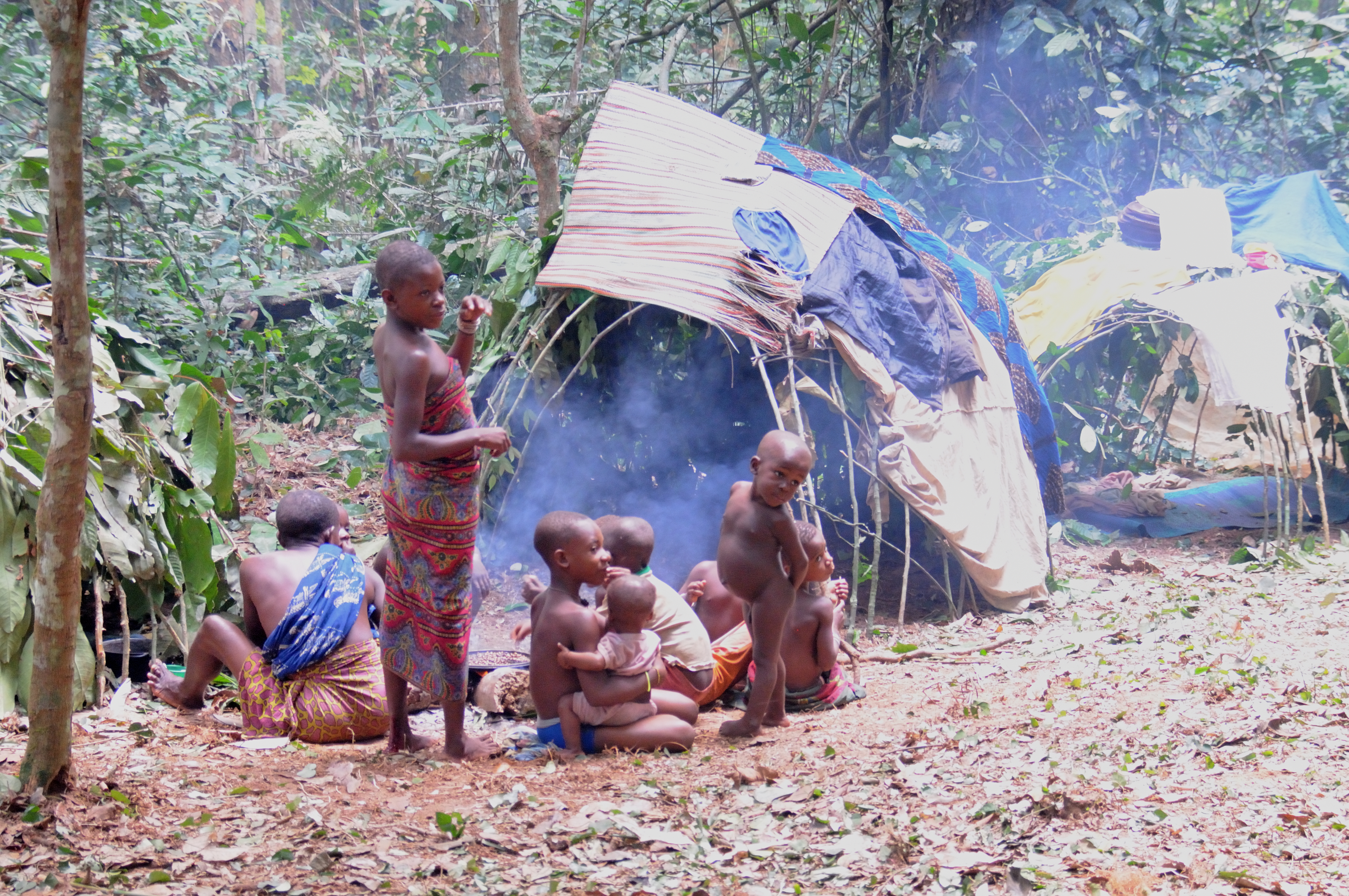
BaAka family at their forest camp in Dzanga-Sangha National Park, Central African Republic.

=== Sex roles ===
Gender roles among the Aka are more flexible than in many other hunter-gatherer societies. Although certain activities are more commonly carried out by men or women, labour is not rigidly divided and both sexes regularly participate in childcare, food gathering and hunting.

Women hunt as well as men and, in some contexts, may even be more successful hunters. They have been observed hunting during late pregnancy and returning to hunting shortly after childbirth, sometimes carrying newborn infants while taking part in hunting expeditions.

Although most decisions are shared, some specialised roles documented by anthropologist Barry Hewlett, including kombeti (camp leader), tuma (elephant hunter) and nganga (healer), have generally been held by men.

=== Parenting ===
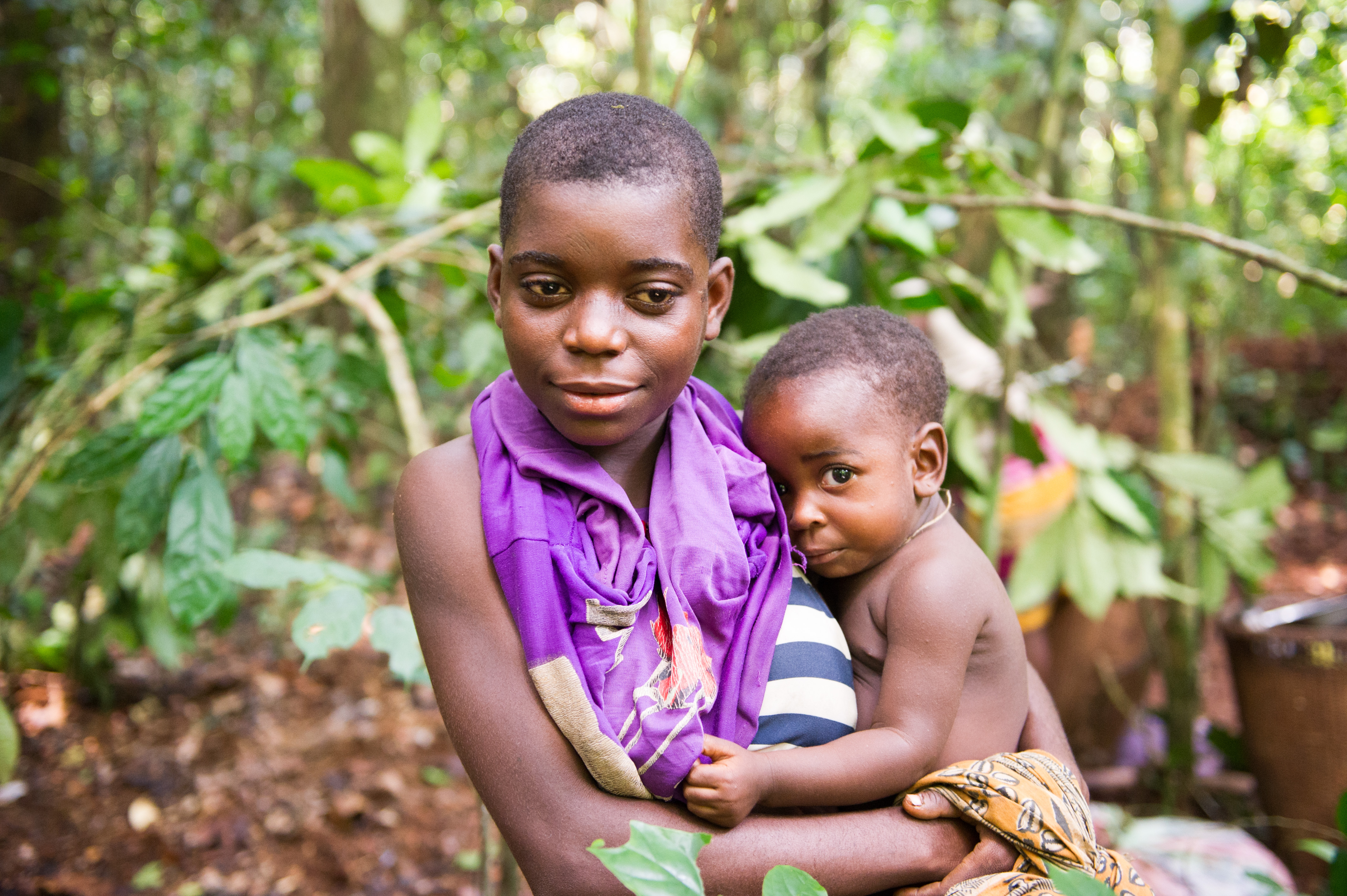
Woman with baby in southern Central African Republic in 2014

Childcare is one of the best-studied aspects of Aka society. Infants are almost constantly in physical contact with a parent or another caregiver, and it is unusual for young children to be left unattended. Rather than using cots or cradles, babies are normally carried throughout the day by different members of the camp.

Aka fathers spend more time in close physical contact with their infants than has been documented in any other known society. Barry Hewlett found that fathers keep their infants within arm's reach for almost half of the day and make frequent physical contact during everyday activities.

Men commonly take their infants to social gatherings, carrying them on their chest while spending time with other adults. They also participate directly in feeding and caring for young children. This high level of paternal involvement has been linked to the cooperative nature of Aka society and to the close relationships between husbands and wives, who commonly share childcare, food preparation, hunting and many other daily activities.

== History ==
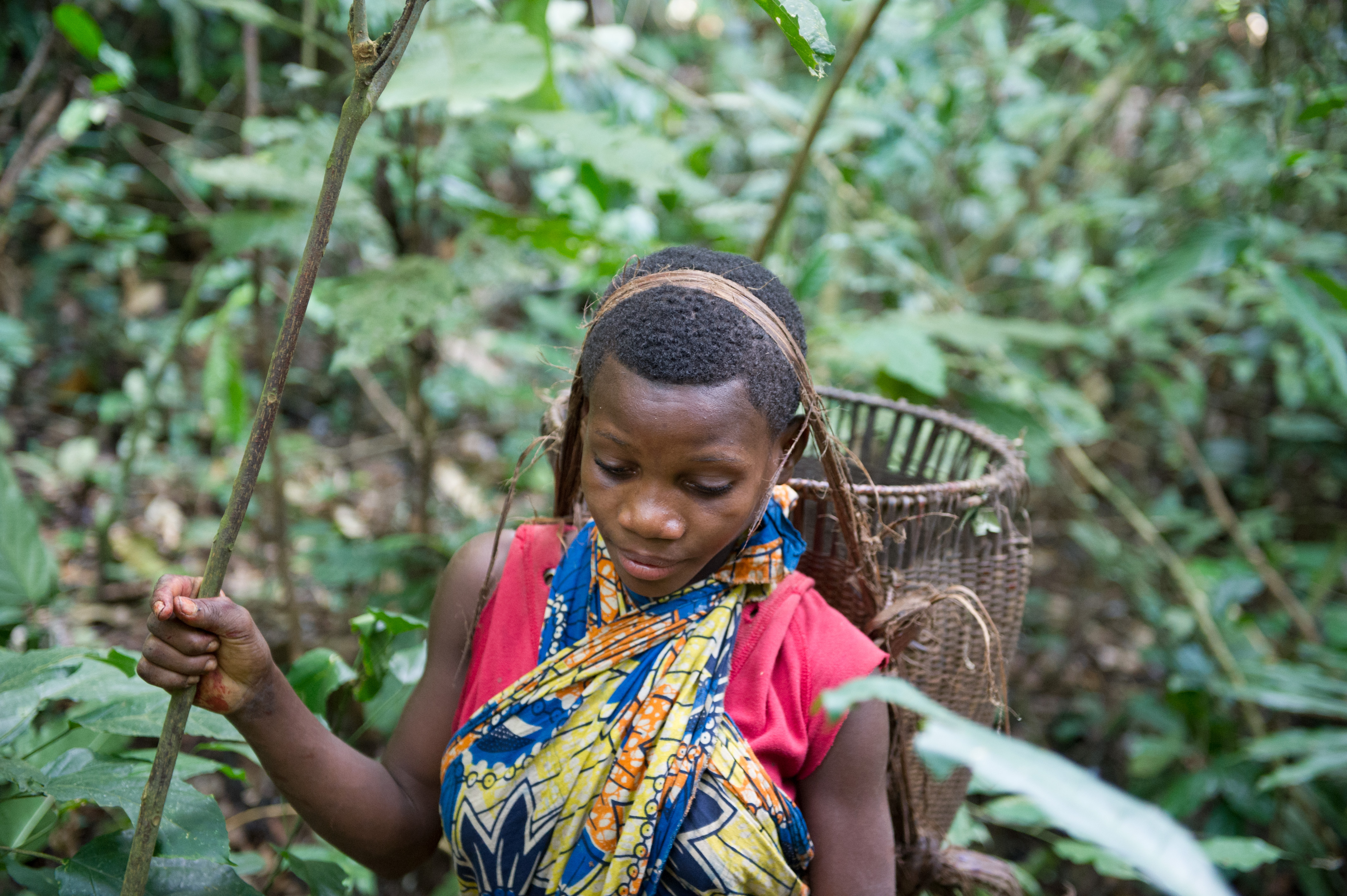
Woman hunting in southern Central African Republic in 2014

The early history of the Aka is poorly documented. Genetic, linguistic and anthropological research suggests that Mbenga hunter-gatherer populations have inhabited the forests of the Congo Basin for thousands of years. Throughout this period, the Aka maintained a distinct cultural identity while developing long-standing exchange relationships with neighbouring Bantu-speaking farming communities.

These relationships were based on exchange. The Aka supplied forest products such as bushmeat, honey and other wild resources, while neighbouring villages provided cultivated foods, iron tools and manufactured goods. Although both groups depended on one another economically, anthropologists have noted that farming communities generally occupied the dominant social position.

During the nineteenth century, increasing demand for ivory drew the Aka into regional trading networks. Many became skilled elephant hunters, supplying tusks that reached European markets through neighbouring intermediaries. Under French colonial rule, logging expanded, roads were opened through the forest and nearby communities were drawn into rubber production, bringing the Aka into closer contact with the outside world.

From the early twentieth century, communal net hunting gradually became more widespread than hunting with spears. Because net hunting relied on the coordinated work of several people, women took a more active role in hunting expeditions than in many other hunter-gatherer societies.

In the 1930s, French colonial authorities encouraged the Aka to settle in roadside villages. Many, however, continued to move between temporary forest camps, maintaining a largely mobile way of life. Permanent settlement became more common only during the second half of the twentieth century, as logging, conservation programmes, schools and healthcare services brought increasing numbers of Aka into closer contact with settled communities.

Today many Aka combine hunting, fishing and gathering with wage labour, ecotourism and conservation work. Many also work as wildlife trackers, guides and field assistants in protected areas across the Sangha region, while maintaining many aspects of their traditional knowledge of the rainforest.

== Language ==
The Aka speak the Aka language, an Ubangian language spoken mainly in the south-western Central African Republic and the northern Republic of the Congo. Unlike several other Central African hunter-gatherer groups, the Aka have retained their own language while maintaining long-standing relationships with neighbouring Bantu-speaking farming communities.

Most Aka are multilingual and also speak one or more Bantu languages used by neighbouring farming populations. The particular second language varies according to the region and reflects centuries of economic, social and cultural interaction with neighbouring peoples. Long-standing contact has resulted in the exchange of vocabulary between Aka and neighbouring Bantu languages, particularly in areas related to agriculture, trade and material culture.

The Aka language is transmitted primarily through oral tradition and remains central to the community's cultural identity. Traditional songs, stories, ritual practices and knowledge of the rainforest are passed from one generation to the next through everyday life rather than through written records.

== Conservation ==
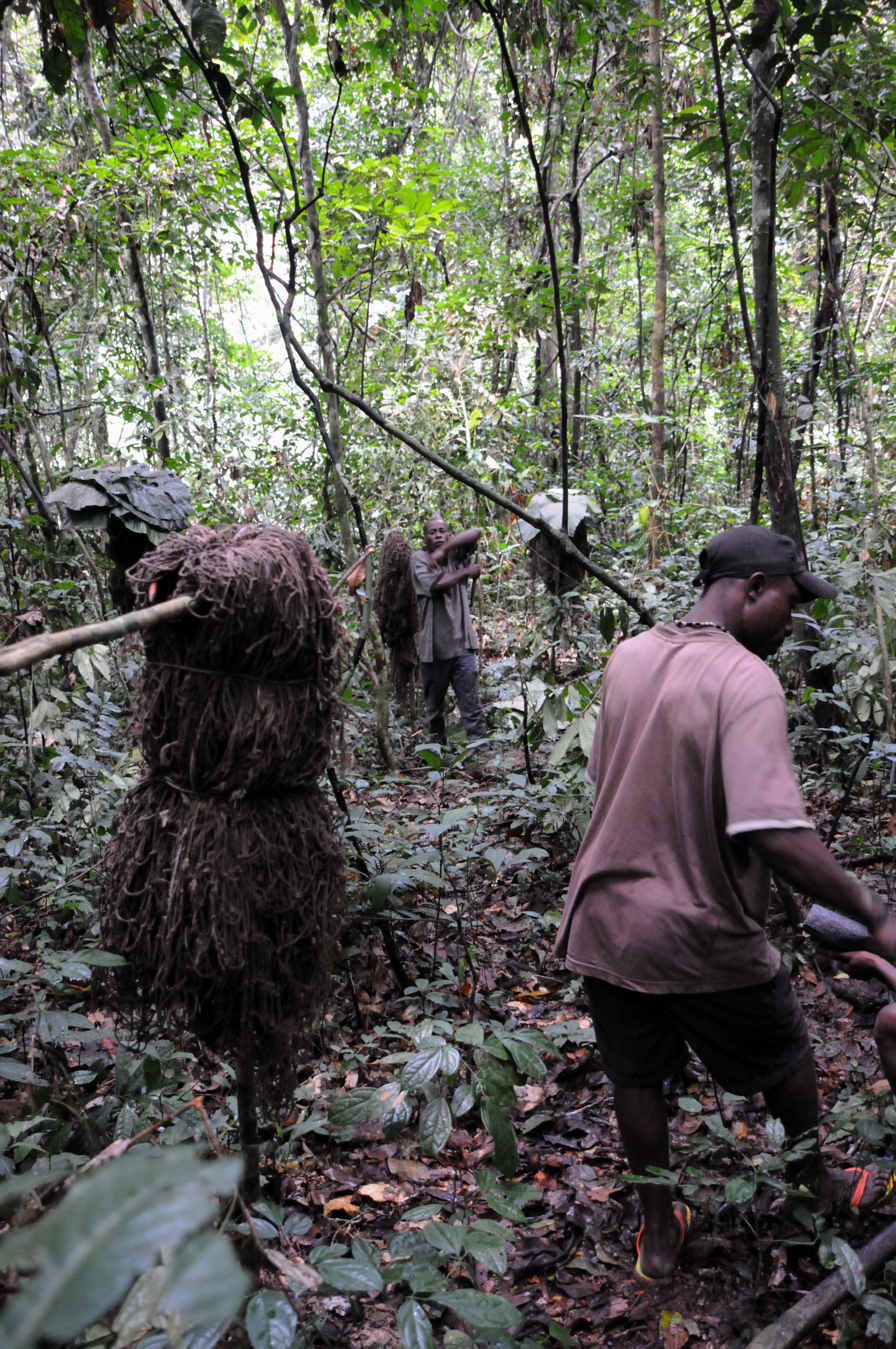
Aka hunter carrying a traditional hunting net. Many Aka now work as wildlife trackers and guides, drawing on generations of knowledge of the rainforest.

The Aka play an important role in conservation programmes across the Sangha region. Their detailed knowledge of the rainforest and its wildlife has made them valued collaborators in scientific research, wildlife monitoring and ecotourism, particularly in the Dzanga-Sangha Protected Areas of the Central African Republic and the neighbouring Nouabalé-Ndoki National Park in the Republic of the Congo.

Many Aka work as wildlife trackers, guides and field assistants. Their ability to follow tracks, interpret signs left by animals and move through dense rainforest is widely relied upon by researchers and tourism guides monitoring western lowland gorillas, African forest elephants and other forest species.

For many communities, conservation has also become an additional source of income through employment in research projects and ecotourism. At the same time, organisations working with Indigenous peoples note that the Aka continue to face challenges related to land rights, access to education and healthcare, and the protection of their traditional culture.

== Music ==
Polyphonic singing is one of the best-known features of Aka culture. It accompanies communal celebrations as well as ceremonies associated with forest spirits, and remains an important part of community life. The music is characterised by several interlocking vocal lines that are continuously adapted through improvisation, creating a rich and complex polyphonic texture. It has been studied by ethnomusicologists for decades and is regarded as one of the most sophisticated vocal traditions in Central Africa.

In 2003, the polyphonic singing of the Aka was proclaimed by UNESCO as a Masterpiece of the Oral and Intangible Heritage of Humanity. It was later incorporated into UNESCO's Representative List of the Intangible Cultural Heritage of Humanity.

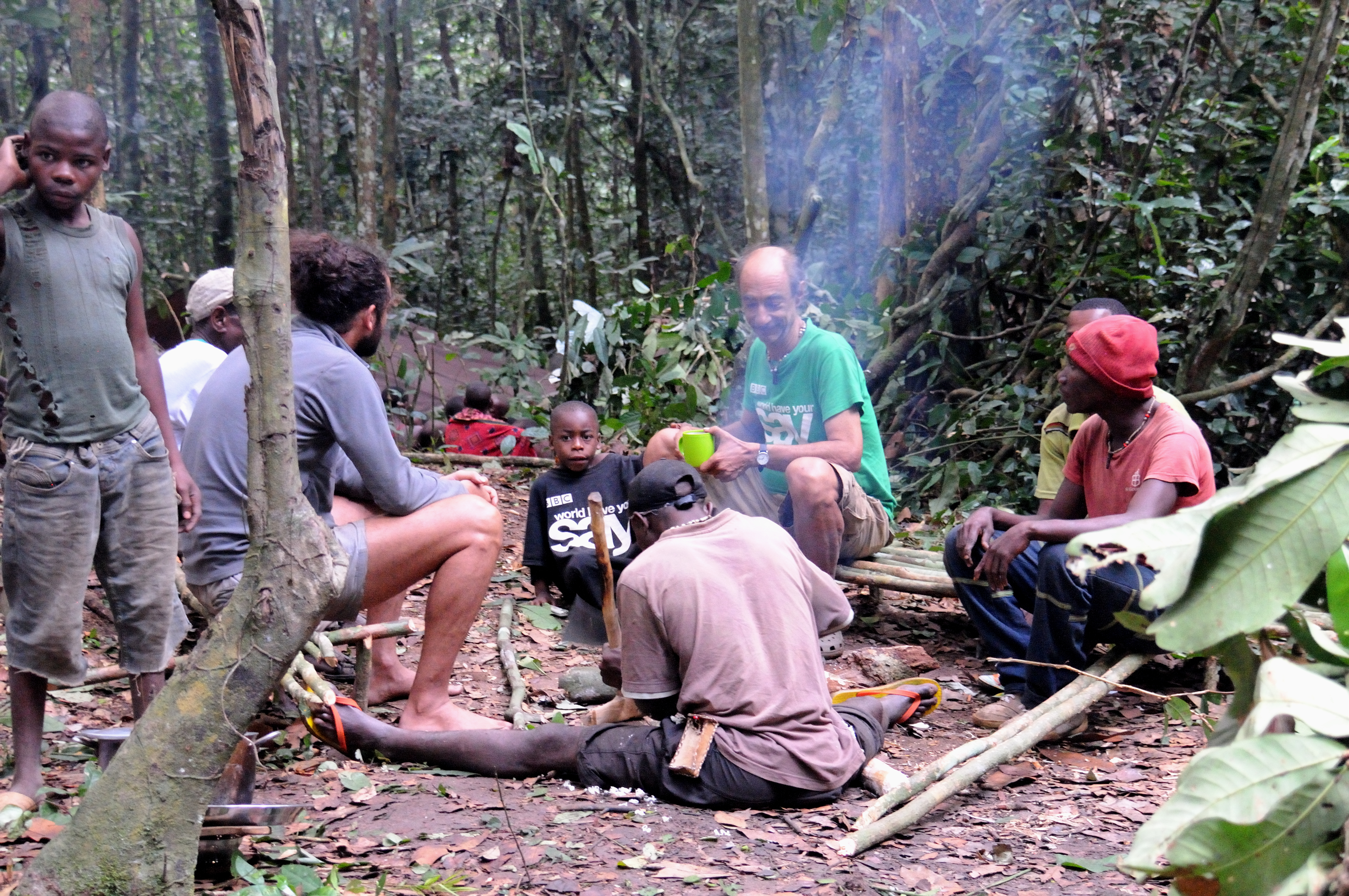
Louis Sarno with members of the Aka community with whom he lived for more than thirty years.

Several researchers have documented Aka music over the past decades. Simha Arom produced some of the first systematic studies of Aka polyphony, while Michelle Kisliuk examined its social and performative context. Mauro Campagnoli has documented Aka musical instruments and compared them with those of neighbouring pygmy groups, particularly the Baka. American ethnomusicologist and writer Louis Sarno spent more than thirty years living with an Aka community after first hearing their polyphonic singing in a radio broadcast. During that time he recorded more than 1,400 hours of music, oral traditions and rainforest soundscapes. The archive he created forms one of the largest collections of Aka field recordings.

Traditional Aka polyphonic singing, percussion and rainforest sounds recorded during a nighttime ceremony in the Dzanga-Sangha Special Reserve, Central African Republic, in 2014.

Aka musicians appear on African Rhythms (György Ligeti, Steve Reich and Pierre-Laurent Aimard, 2003), Echoes of the Forest: Music of the Central African Pygmies (Ellipsis Arts, 1995), BOYOBI: Ritual Music of the Rainforest Pygmies (Louis Sarno, 2000), and Bayaka: The Extraordinary Music of the BaBenzele Pygmies (Louis Sarno, 1996).

== Films ==
The 2013 film Song from the Forest tells the story of American Louis Sarno who lived among the Bayaka pygmies in the Central African rainforest for 25 years and travels with his son, 13-year-old Samedi, to New York City.

== Notable people ==
- Simon Samba, Central African politician

== See also ==
Other Pygmy groups:

- Efé
- Baka
- Twa peoples

Anthropologists studying the Aka:

- Barry Hewlett
- Michelle Kisliuk

== Books ==
- Seize the Dance! BaAka Musical Life and the Ethnography of Performance by Michelle Kisliuk (Oxford University Press, 2000).
- Song from the Forest -- My Life Among the Ba-Benjellé Pygmies by Louis Sarno (Houghton Mifflin 1993).
