= Lexikon zur Fotografie in Österreich 1839 bis 1945 =

The Lexikon zur Fotografie in Österreich 1839 bis 1945 first appeared in 2005 in the Vienna-based Albumverlag. It was published by the Austrian cultural scientist, curator and photo journalist Timm Starl with the ISBN 978-3-85164-150-9 and ISBN 3-85164-150-7. The encyclopedia contains data on persons, institutions and companies, photo schools, associations and federations, cooperatives and guilds formerly and/or still active in Austria as well as photo exhibitions, newspapers and magazines for the period from the invention of photography in 1839 until the end of the Second World War in 1945.
