= Tim Butcher =

English author, broadcaster and journalist (born 1967)

Tim Butcher FRSGS
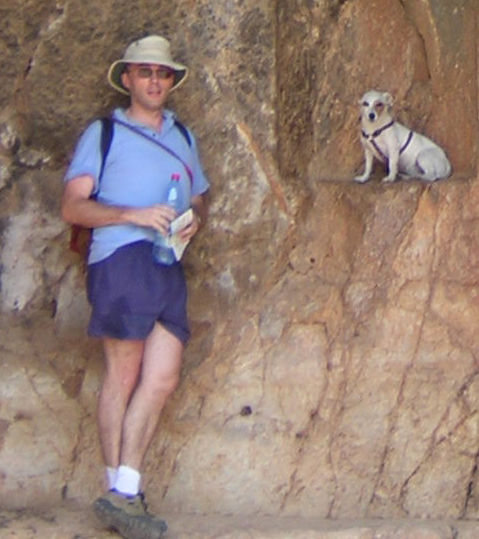
- Butcher and his Jack Russell "Betty", Israel, 2007
- Born: 15 November 1967 (age 58); England
- Education: Magdalen College, Oxford
- Occupation: Writer
- Writing career
- Genres: Travel writing, Journalism
- Notable work: Blood River: A Journey to Africa's Broken Heart
- Website: tim-butcher.com

Tim Butcher (born 15 November 1967) is an English author, broadcaster and journalist. He is the author of Blood River (2007), Chasing the Devil (2010) and The Trigger (2014), travel books blending contemporary adventure with history.

== Career ==
=== Journalism ===
As a journalist between 1990 and 2009, Butcher worked for The Daily Telegraph newspaper, holding a series of positions including leader writer, war correspondent, Africa Bureau Chief, and Middle East Correspondent. He remains a regular contributor to the BBC radio programme From Our Own Correspondent and has written for numerous British, US and international publications.

=== Author ===
As an author, he published in 2007 his first book Blood River: A Journey to Africa's Broken Heart, an account of his 2004 journey through Democratic Republic of the Congo (DR Congo) overland from Lake Tanganyika and down the Congo River, following the route of Henry Morton Stanley's 1874–77 trans-Africa expedition. The book, published by Chatto & Windus, reached Number 1 in the Sunday Times best-seller list and also appeared on The New York Times best-seller list.

Translated into six languages, Blood River was the only non-fiction title in the Richard & Judy Book Club 2008 and was shortlisted that year for a number of British writing awards, including the Samuel Johnson Prize, the Dolman Best Travel Book Award, and the Writers' Guild of Great Britain Best Book award. The book's Polish version, Rzeka Krwi (translated by Jakub Czernik and published in 2009 by Carta Blanca), was longlisted for the 2010 Ryszard Kapuściński Prize.

In 2009, Butcher wrote a chapter for Because I am a Girl (January 2010), a charitable compilation of stories focusing on the plight of young women and girls in the developing world. Published by Vintage, the book was the brainchild of Plan International, a leading children's rights aid group.

Butcher's second major work, Chasing the Devil: The Search for Africa's Fighting Spirit (2010), describes a 350-mile trek through Sierra Leone and Liberia following a trail blazed by Graham Greene and recounted in Greene's Journey Without Maps (1936). It was longlisted for the Orwell Prize for political writing.

In 2010, he received an honorary Doctorate from the University of Northampton in the United Kingdom, for service as a journalist and author.

He also contributed a chapter to Ox Travels: Meetings with Remarkable Travel Writers (Ox Tales) (released in May 2011), another compilation, this time on behalf of Oxfam, the international confederation working against poverty and injustice.

In 2012, Blood River became a text used in AS-Level English Language and Literature Combined, alongside Joseph Conrad's Heart of Darkness.

In 2013, Butcher was awarded the Mungo Park Medal by the Royal Scottish Geographical Society, in recognition of achievements as an explorer and educator.

His most recent book, The Trigger – Hunting the Assassin who Brought the World to War, was published in May 2014 by Chatto & Windus. It tells the story of Gavrilo Princip, the teenage assassin who triggered the First World War by assassinating Archduke Franz Ferdinand of Austria in Sarajevo, on 28 June 1914.

== Sources ==
- "Tim Butcher interview on Blood River". KevinPerry.com. 10 October 2008.
- Wisner, Geoff (31 October 2008). "Solo in the Congo: Review of Blood River". The Wall Street Journal.
- "Amanda Ross on Why Blood River Did Well in the Richard & Judy Book Club". The Times.
