= Song from the Forest =

2013 film by Michael Obert

- Film poster
- Directed by: Michael Obert
- Written by: Michael Obert
- Produced by: Alex Tondowski
- Starring: Louis Sarno, Samedi Mathurin Bokombe, Jim Jarmusch
- Cinematography: Siri Klug
- Edited by: Wiebke Grundler
- Production companies: Tondowski Films & Friends
- Distributed by: The Film Collaborative
- Release date: November 21, 2013 (IDFA)
- Running time: 98 minutes
- Country: Germany
- Languages: English, Yaka

Song from the Forest is a 2013 German documentary film written and directed by Michael Obert. The film premiered on 21 November 2013 at International Documentary Film Festival Amsterdam, where it was honored with the Best Feature Length Documentary Award.

== Summary ==
Louis Sarno is an American who decided to travel to the Central African jungle after hearing a song played on the radio. There he recorded music by the BaAka community and ended up staying to become part of the community. 25 years later Louis is taking his pygmy son Samedi to America as part of a promise, but he soon discovers that he is no longer truly a part of American society any longer and that globalization is having a serious effect on the rainforests.

== Awards ==
- 2015: German Documentary Film Award for Song From the Forest
- 2014 Grand Prix at Planete+Doc International Film Festival in Warsaw
- 2013 Best Feature Length Documentary Award, International Documentary Film Festival Amsterdam

== Reception ==
Critical reception for Song from the Forest has been positive. The Hollywood Reporter praised the film and wrote "Quietly resonant documentary on an unusual father/son relationship finds fresh notes among familiar ethnographic themes."
