= Geoff Wisner =

American author, book reviewer and editor

Geoff Wisner is an American author, book reviewer, and editor. His articles appear in publications such as The Christian Science Monitor, Words Without Borders, Transition Magazine, Boston Globe, Wall Street Journal, and Wild Earth. He is a graduate of Harvard University (1980). He currently lives in New York City. He is married to Jennifer Marie Brissett, a writer.

== Books ==
- Thoreau's Animals, published by Yale University Press (2017)
- Thoreau's Wildflowers, published by Yale University Press (2016)
- African Lives: An Anthology of Memoirs and Autobiographies, published by Lynne Rienner Publishers (2013)
- A Basket of Leaves: 99 Books That Capture the Spirit of Africa , published by Jacana Media (2007)

== Work reviews ==
- Poetry Written Out of Outrage: The Rising of the Ashes by Tahar Ben Jelloun, The Quarterly Conversation (2010)
- Magical Realist Africa: A River Called Time by Mia Couto, The Quarterly Conversation (2010)
- Dreams in a Time of War: A Childhood Memoir by Ngũgĩ wa Thiong'o, The Quarterly Conversation (2010)
- Beneath the Lion's Gaze by Maaza Mengiste, The Christian Science Monitor (2010)
- The Journal of Henry David Thoreau edited by Damion Searls, The Quarterly Conversation (2009)
- The Education of a British-Protected Child by Chinua Achebe, The Christian Science Monitor (2009)
- Becoming Americans edited by Ilan Stavans, The Christian Science Monitor (2009)
- The Pattern in the Carpet by Margaret Drabble, The Christian Science Monitor (2009)
- The Thing Around Your Neck by Chimamanda Ngozi Adichie, The Quarterly Conversation (2009)
- An Elegy for Easterly, by Petina Gappah, The Christian Science Monitor (2009)
- Gods and Soldiers: The Penguin Anthology of Contemporary African Writing by Rob Spillman (editor), The Quarterly Conversation (2009)
- "Solo in the Congo", Blood River: A Journey to Africa's Broken Heart by Tim Butcher, Wall Street Journal (2008)
- "Love, like violence, can be random", The Stone Virgins by Yvonne Vera, African Review of Books (2004)
- "Congo's history in the life of one man", The Fire of Origins by Emmanuel Dongala, African Review of Books (2001)
- "Abuses of Haiti", The Uses of Haiti by Paul Farmer, Transition 66 (1995)
- "Wolves in the Hills", High Noon in Southern Africa by Chester Crocker, Transition 60 (1993)
- "Dry Season", African Laughter: Four Visits to Zimbabwe by Doris Lessing, Transition 59 (1993)
- The Lives of Beryl Markham by Errol Trzebinski, Boston Sunday Globe (1993)

== Articles ==
- "Fleurs du Mal: A Visit to Haiti", Global Exchange (1997)
- "Haiti as a Tourist Destination", Global Exchange (1997)
- "Noted With Pleasure", excerpt from The Best of Bad Hemingway, The New York Times (1992)

== Interviews ==
- 99 Essential African Books: The Geoff Wisner Interview, A Quarterly Conversation interview with Scott Esposito (September 2009)
- Laura Reviews ... Laura Cococcia interviews Geoff Wisner (April 2009)
- Interview with Geoff Wisner conducted by Victor Dlamini on SAfm. (July 2007)
