= Blood River: A Journey to Africa's Broken Heart =

2007 book by Tim Butcher

- First edition
- Author: Tim Butcher
- Subject: Congo River; Democratic Republic of the Congo
- Publication date: 2007
- Pages: 363
- ISBN: 9780701179816
- Dewey Decimal: 916.7510434

Blood River: A Journey to Africa's Broken Heart (also published as Blood River: The Terrifying Journey Through the World's Most Dangerous Country) is a 2007 book by British journalist and writer Tim Butcher.

== Background and synopsis ==
Blood River was written after Butcher was posted as an Africa foreign correspondent for British newspaper The Daily Telegraph. The book follows Butcher's mission to recreate the expedition of explorer H. M. Stanley – travelling alone through the Congo. The book not only tells the story of Butcher's journey but the remarkable story of the Democratic Republic of the Congo.

== Reception ==
The book was largely received with critical acclaim. In Foreign Affairs Blood River was described by Nicolas van de Walle as "a gripping story and an absorbing look at a country that has been moving backward for half a century." van de Walle concluded praising the book as "a masterful description of a country moving backwards."

In Getaway, a South African magazine, the reviewer wrote that "Butcher had not only the courage, but the insight to tell a great story of a country struggling to emerge from a history of colonial rule." Butcher was praised for his "great knowledge of the country's history, his ability to convey scenes and characters in crisp prose, and his interpretation of the complex situation of the Congo today."

Rory MacLean, wrote in The Guardian that "Blood River is a gripping, passionate and deeply disturbing portrait of central Africa today."

The London Evening Standard listed Blood River as one of "The Best Summer Paperbacks", praising it as an "astonishing travel book."

=== Recognition ===
Blood River was shortlisted for the 2008 Baillie Gifford Prize.
