= Wiener Bilder =

Austrian magazine supplement to Das interessante Blatt (1882–1939)

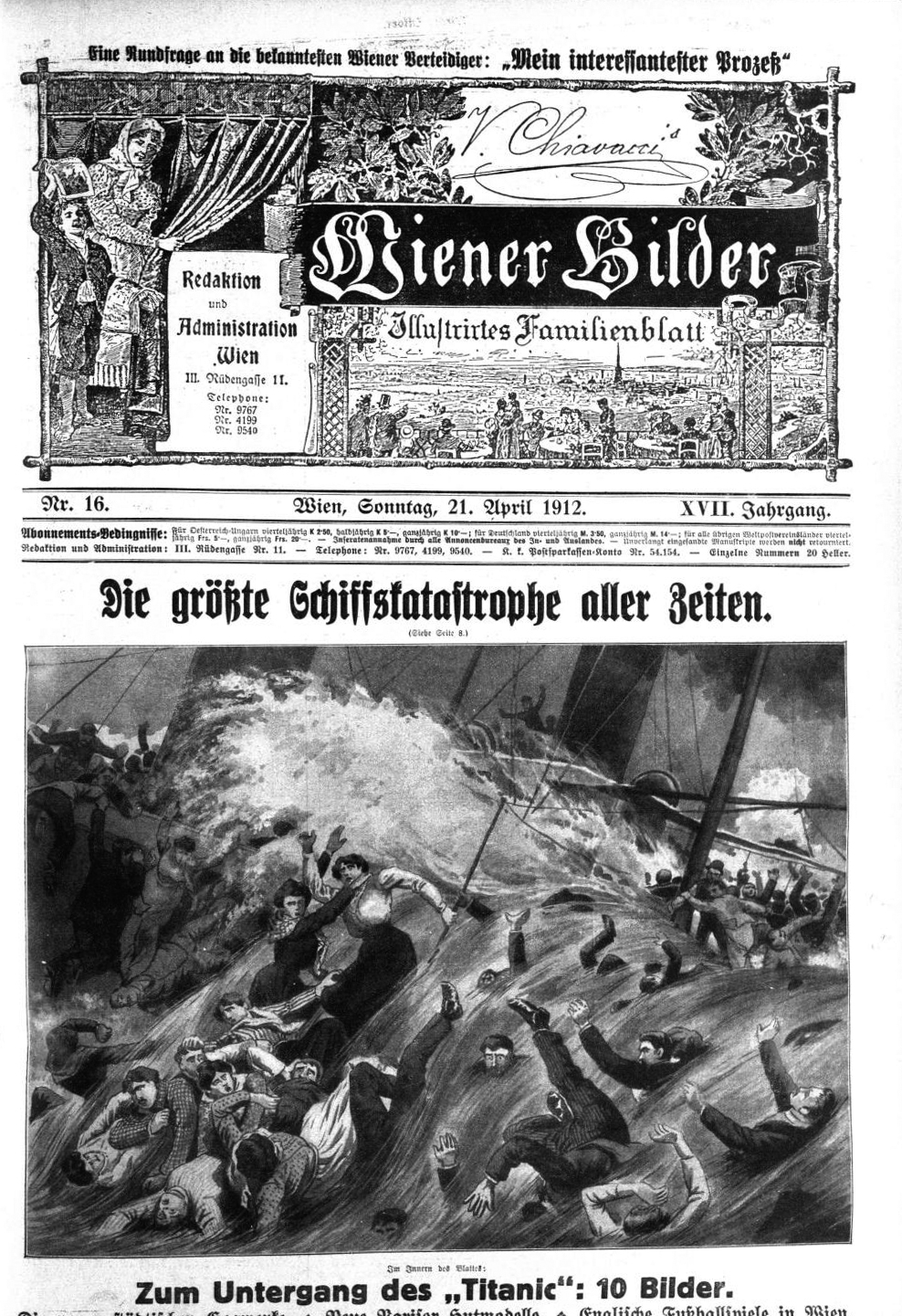
The sinking of RMS Titanic as illustrated on the 21 April 1912 issue of Wiener Bilder

Wiener Bilder; (lit. 'Viennese Pictures') was the illustrated supplement of the Austrian conservative weekly newspaper Das interessante Blatt which appeared weekly from 1882 to 1939.

== History ==
From 26 June 1898 to 9 July 1898, a special edition was published under the title Kaiser-Jubiläums-Schützen-Zeitungt.

== Bibliography ==
- Helmut W. Lang (ed.): Austrian Retrospective Bibliography (ORBI). Edited at the Austrian National Library. Series 2: Austrian newspapers 1492–1945, Volume 3: Bibliography of Austrian newspapers 1621–1945, A–M, p. 404.
- Helmut W. Lang (ed.): Austrian Retrospective Bibliography (ORBI). Edited at the Austrian National Library. Series 2: Austrian newspapers 1492–1945, Volume 3: Bibliography of Austrian newspapers 1621–1945, N–Z, p. 406.
