= Peter Holmgren =

- Education: Ph.D. Forestry, Swedish University of Agricultural Sciences
- Title: Former Director General of the Center for International Forestry Research (CIFOR)
- Term: 2012 - 2017

Peter Holmgren is a forestry specialist and the former director general of the Center for International Forestry Research.

== Career ==
In 1998, Holmgren joined the Food and Agriculture Organization of the United Nations (FAO) to lead the Global Forest Resources Assessment. From 2003 to 2007, he was head of forest resources development. After 2007, he led the Climate, Energy, and Tenure division. During this time, Holmgren played a leading role in the establishment of the UN-REDD program. He would later criticize this initiative.

During his tenure at the Center for International Forestry Research, he was instrumental in the creation of the Global Landscapes Forum (GLF), merging Forest Day and Agriculture and Rural Development Day. Under his leadership, the center updated its strategy to align it with the Sustainable Development Goals. His thoughts on forestry and sustainable development are reflected on over 50 entries to the "DG's Column." Holmgren stayed in this role until October 2017, when he was replaced by Robert Nasi.
