= Congo Basin Forest Partnership =

Tropical forest conservation initiative

The Congo Basin Forest Partnership (CBFP) is a non-profit initiative to promote the conservation and responsible management of the Congo Basin's tropical forests. The project aims to improve the techniques and information sharing of involved organizations. It is led by the United States and sponsored by more than 40 international governments and investors.

== History ==
The CBFP was launched in September 2002 at the Johannesburg World Summit on Sustainable Development by U.S. Secretary of State Colin Powell and African government leaders. It was built on the same framework as the Yaounde Declaration, whose stated aim is "to protect forests through the harmonization of forest policies, protected areas, regulations against poaching, and the adoption of practices for sustainable forest use".

The first meeting of the CBFP took place in Paris, France, in January 2003, and agreed on basic organizational principles, named a facilitator, recognized the Conference of Ministers of Forests of Central Africa as its central political, technical, policy, and decision-making guide, and recognized that Conference's "Plan de Convergence" as the framework for future actions of the CBFP.

In October 2003, the CBFP held a meeting that was open to the public in Yaounde, Cameroon, to discuss the policies and activities of the Conference of Ministers of Forests of Central Africa, which named a co-facilitator for the CBFP at the meeting.

On November 11 and 12, 2003, the Partnership met again in Yaounde to bring together the Central African Forest Commission (COMIFAC), development partners, NGO's, international organizations, and private sector representatives.

On February 12, 2004, U.S. President George W. Bush approved The Congo Basin Forest Partnership Act.

The CBFP met in Douala, Republic of Cameroon on March 1 and 2, 2011. This was followed by a conference on September 13–16, 2011, in Douala on the theme "How can Community Control over Woodlands be Obtained and Maintained?" Meanwhile, on September 14, 2011, the Partnership met in Yaounde to discuss the implementation status of a road map, to examine major challenges in scientific research, and to update the facilitation working plan.

On November 15, 2011, delegates from eight central African countries met to create a new action plan to strengthen the enforcement of national wildlife laws.

The Congo Basin Forest Partnership was facilitated by the United States from 2003 to 2004, France from 2005 to 2007, and Germany from 2008 to 2009. It has no scheduled end date and will continue to operate as long as it receives enough funding.

== Purpose ==
The stated goal of the Congo Basin Forest Partnership is "to promote the sustainable management of the Congo Basin's forests and wildlife by improving communication, cooperation, and collaboration among all the partners". Its objectives include the preservation of the ecology and biodiversity of the wildlife and forests, and making their use and protection sustainable for the long-term benefit of both the region and its inhabitants. In pursuit of this mission, the Partnership promotes economic development, the alleviation of poverty, effective governance by the conservation and sustained management of natural resources, including wildlife and forests, and the sharing of information between partners and associates.

The CBFP works closely with the Central African Forest Commission, the regional body in charge of forests and environmental policy, coordination and harmonization, with the objective of promoting conservation and sustained management of the Congo Basin's ecosystem. The CBFP's primary focuses are the protection and management of the natural resources required for economic and social development, forests, poverty eradication, biodiversity, an institutional framework for sustainable development, and changing unsustainable patterns of consumption and production. Its secondary focuses are sustainable development for Africa, education, water, rural development, tourism, agriculture, and climate change.

== Protected landscapes ==
- Monte Alen – Mont de Cristal Inselbergs Forest Landscape (Equatorial Guinea & Gabon)
- Gamba – Conkouati Forest Landscape (Gabon, Congo) & (Democratic Republic of Congo)
- Lope – Chaillu – Louesse Forest Landscape (Gabon & Congo)
- Dja – Minkebe – Odzala Tri-national Forest Landscape (Cameroon, Congo & Gabon)
- Sangha Tri-national Forest Landscape (Cameroon, Congo, Central African Republic)
- Lac Tele – Lac Tumba Swamp Forest Landscape (Congo & Democratic Republic of Congo)
- Bateke Plateau Forest Savanna Landscape (Congo & Gabon)
- Maringa/Lopori – Wamba Forest Landscape (Democratic Republic of Congo)
- Salonga – Lukenie – Sankuru Forest Landscape (Democratic Republic of Congo)
- Maiko – Lulunguru Tanya – Kahuzi Biega Forest Landscape (Democratic Republic of Congo)
- Ituri – Epulu – Aru Forest Landscape (Democratic Republic of Congo)
- Virunga Forest Landscape (Democratic Republic of Congo & Rwanda)

== Functioning ==
The CBFP is an international association comprising more than 40 governments, international and private sector organizations, and representatives of civil society. It is a non-binding partnership based on voluntary agreements between governments, the private sector, civil society and developmental organizations. The Partnership covers the geographical region of sub-regional Central Africa, mainly around the Congo Basin, and is implemented in Cameroon, the Central African Republic, the Republic of the Congo, the Democratic Republic of the Congo, Equatorial Guinea, and Gabon. The CBFP works in accordance with COMIFAC's strategic plan, the "Plan de Convergence". Unlike most traditional partnerships, it does not create new institutions, but instead helps its partners and their associates to be more efficient. The CBFP is set to receive approximately $230 million U.S. dollars of funding over the course of several years.

== Funding ==
- US$53 million from the United States
- €151.9 million from various European countries
- €65 million from ECOFAC
- €15 million from France
- €20 million from Germany
- €4 million from Belgium
- US$1.3 billion from Japan
- US$75 million from the United States

== Participants ==
- United States of America – U.S. Department of State
- Belgium
- Cameroon
- Canada
- Central African Republic
- Congo
- Democratic Republic of the Congo
- Equatorial Guinea
- France
- Gabon
- Germany
- Japan
- South Africa
- United Kingdom of Great Britain and Northern Ireland – United Kingdom
- Burundi
- Chad
- European Commission
- Netherlands
- Rwanda
- São Tomé and Príncipe
- Spain

== Affiliated groups ==
- Assoc. Technique Internationale des Bois Tropicaux (France)
- Center for International Forestry Research (Indonesia)
- Jane Goodall Institute (United Kingdom of Great Britain and Northern Ireland)
- American Forest & Paper Association (United States of America)
- Conservation International (United States of America)
- Forest Trends (United States of America)
- Society of American Foresters (United States of America)
- Wildlife Conservation Society (United States of America)
- World Resources Institute (United States of America)
- World Wildlife Fund (United States of America)
- African Development Bank
- COMICAF
- FAO
- Global Mechanism of the UNICD
- GRASP
- International Tropical Timber Organization
- Secretariat of the Convention on Biological Diversity
- Secretariat of the Convention on Migratory Species
- UNDP
- UNEP
- UNESCO

== Other involved organizations ==
- The World Bank (United States of America)
- The European Commission (Belgium)
- IUCN-The World Conversation Union (Switzerland)
- African Wildlife Foundation
- International Union for Conservation of Nature
- Netherlands Development Organization

== See also ==
- List of supranational environmental agencies
