= Chomba (surname) =

Chomba is an African surname. Notable people with the surname include:

- Eric William Chomba (born 1988), Zambian footballer
- Samuel Chomba (1964–1993), Zambian footballer
- Susan Chomba, Kenyan scientist
