= International Day of Forests =

International day established by the United Nations

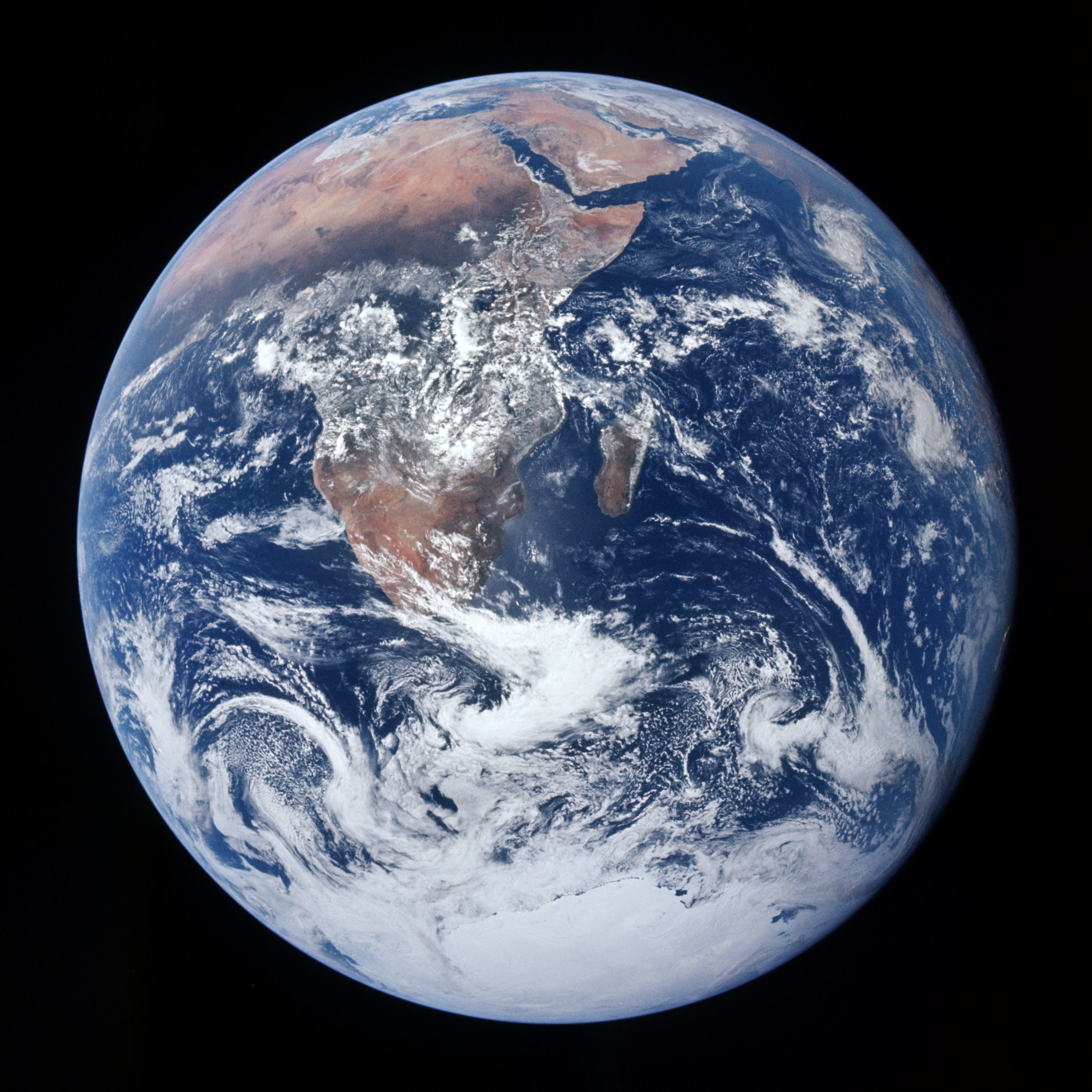
- Also called: IDF
- Observed by: UN Members
- Date: 21 March
- Next time: 21 March 2027
- Frequency: annual

The International Day of Forests, the 21st day of March, was established by resolution of the United Nations General Assembly on 28 November 2012. Each year, various events celebrate and raise awareness of the importance of all types of forests, and trees outside forests, for the benefit of current and future generations. Countries are encouraged to undertake efforts to organize local, national, and international activities involving forests and trees, such as tree planting campaigns, on International Day of Forests. The Secretariat of the United Nations Forum on Forests, in collaboration with the Food and Agriculture Organization, facilitates the implementation of such events in collaboration with governments, the Collaborative Partnership on Forests, and international, regional and subregional organizations. The day was observed for the first time on 21 March 2013.

== Background ==
Each year more than 13 million hectares (32 million acres) of forests are lost, an area roughly the size of England. As go the forests, so goes the plant and animal species that they embrace – 80% of all terrestrial biodiversity. Forests also especially play a critical role in climate change: deforestation results in 12-18 percent of the world's carbon emissions – almost equal to all the CO_{2} from the global transport sector. Equally crucial, healthy forests are one of the world's primary 'carbon sinks.'

Today, forests cover more than 30% of the world's land and contain more than 60,000 tree species, many as of yet unidentified. Forests provide food, fiber, water and medicines for approximately 1.6 billion of the world's poorest people, including indigenous peoples with unique cultures.

== History ==
In November 1971, the "States members" at the 16th session of the Conference of the Food and Agriculture Organization, voted to establish "World Forestry Day" on March 21 of each year.

in 2001 members of FYEG gathered in the Šumava National Park, Czechia for workshops concerning forestry and preservation efforts. Members from Belgium and Bulgaria, where a 'Day of the Forest' already existed, joined forces and made proposals to bring this yearly event to the European level. Later, their proposal was accepted by the general assembly, represented by national politicians.

From 2007 to 2012, in the Center for International Forestry Research (CIFOR) convened a series of six Forest Days, in conjunction with annual meetings of the United Nations Framework Convention on Climate Change Conference of Parties. CIFOR organized these events on behalf of and in close cooperation with other members of the Collaborative Partnership on Forests (CPF). Following the International Year of Forests in 2011, the International Day of Forests was established by resolution of the United Nations General Assembly on November 28, 2012.

=== Forest Day ===
The catalyst for Forest Day was a casual conversation in Oxford, England, in February 2007, between two scientists who felt the world was underestimating the importance of forests in mitigating carbon emissions and saw a glaring need for the latest forestry research and thinking to inform global policy makers and UNFCCC negotiators. They did not foresee that the conference would become one of the most influential global events on forests and climate change today.

==== Forest Day 1: Bali, Indonesia (2007) ====
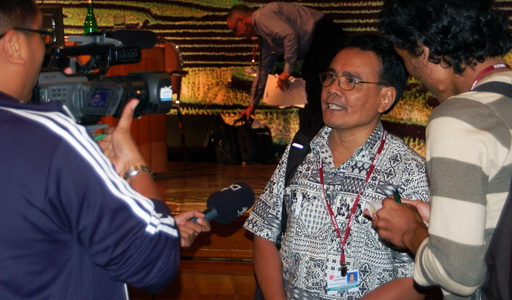
Journalists interview Center for International Forestry Research scientist Daniel Murdiyarso

The inaugural Forest Day was one of the major events at United Nations Framework Convention on Climate Change (UNFCCC) Conference of the Parties (COP) 13 in Bali, Indonesia on 8 December 2007. More than 800 people participated in Forest Day, including scientists, members of national delegations, and representatives from intergovernmental and non-governmental organizations.

A major feature of Forest Day was four parallel panel discussions focusing on cross-cutting themes related to forests and climate change. These well-attended discussions examined such issues as setting baselines and methodological challenges in estimating forest carbon; markets and governance challenges associated with Reducing Emissions from Deforestation and Forest Degradation (REDD+); adaptation to climate change; and equity-efficiency trade-offs.

Areas of consensus emerging from the discussions included the following:

- While there are significant methodological challenges to be surmounted, current methods are "good enough" to proceed with the design of mechanisms for reducing emissions from both deforestation and degradation.
- Governance-related challenges pose the greatest risks for both international investors and local stakeholders in the context of new mechanisms.
- Mechanisms should be simple, and should not repeat the mistakes of the Clean Development Mechanism.
- The success of any REDD+ mechanism will depend on the political will to address the drivers of deforestation, including drivers that originate beyond the forestry sector.
- Adaptation efforts need to shift from responsive to anticipatory, and should be focused on the most vulnerable, including forest-dependent people.

==== Forest Day 2: Poznań, Poland (2008) ====
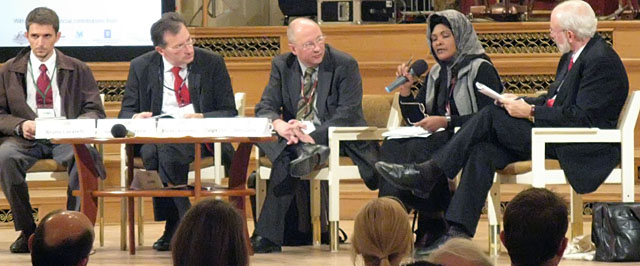
Sub-plenary 1, organized by IUFRO, CIFOR, ICRAF and PROFOR-World Bank, discussed the cross-cutting theme "adaptation of forests to climate change." Panelists included (L-R): Bruno Locatelli, CIFOR; Gerhard Dieterle, World Bank; Markku Kanninen, CIFOR; Balgis Osman-Elasha, IUFRO; and Dennis Garrity, World Agroforestry Center (ICRAF).

Building on the positive response to the first Forest Day, Forest Day 2, held in Poznań, Poland, on December 8, 2008, brought together nearly 900 participants to discuss the opportunities and challenges of bringing forests into global and national strategies for climate change adaptation and mitigation.

Participants stressed the broad importance of forest ecosystems and noted that forests comprise an inter-dependent web of animals, plants and microorganisms, which together provide a wide range of goods and services beyond carbon sequestration. These include biodiversity conservation, rainfall generation and products that are crucial to the livelihoods of local forest dependent and indigenous peoples as well as to the economies of many countries.

Those attending recognized the importance of building on the vast knowledge and experience that exists on sustainable forest management (SFM) and called on negotiators to consult with forest stakeholders as they develop climate policy.

Frances Seymour, Director General of CIFOR delivered a summary of Forest Day 2 to Yvo de Boer, Executive Secretary of the UNFCCC. This summary was drafted by a committee representing members of the CPF, and included points of consensus as well as points of disagreement that emerged during the course of the day. Seymour highlighted the need to:

- Include forests in climate mitigation and adaptation mechanisms and strategies
- Ensure full inclusion and participation of civil society in international, regional, national and local decision-making processes
- Recognize and respect the rights of women, poor people and Indigenous Peoples

==== Forest Day 3: Copenhagen, Denmark (2009) ====
Nearly 1500 stakeholders attended Forest Day 3 held in Copenhagen, Denmark, on 13 December 2009 including 34 donors, government representatives, 88 journalists, 500 NGO representatives, indigenous leaders, 188 private sector representatives and hundreds of scientists and forestry experts. Their goal was to ensure that the design and implementation of forest-related climate mitigation and adaptation measures under consideration in the Climate Change Agreement would be effective, efficient and equitable.

Although the UNFCCC failed to agree on binding targets for reducing greenhouse gas emissions, significant progress was achieved in negotiating the outlines of a REDD+ mechanism. The Copenhagen Accord that emerged was the first international agreement to recommend that financial resources be raised to support REDD+. Australia, France, Japan, Norway, the United Kingdom and the United States offered a US$3.5 billion funding package for REDD+ preparation.

Moreover, one of the indicators of the relevance of Forest Day – its ability to attract world leaders – became clear at Copenhagen. Key speakers at the event included:

- Rajendra K. Pachauri, Chair of the Intergovernmental Panel on Climate Change
- Wangari Maathai, founder of the Green Belt Movement and Nobel laureate
- Gro Harlem Brundtland, former Norwegian Prime Minister
- Hilary Benn, the UK Secretary of State for Environment, Food and Rural Affairs
- Sir Nicholas Stern, head of the Grantham Research Institute on Climate Change and the Environment.

Former US President Bill Clinton appeared via video and Nobel Prize winner Elinor Ostrom was among the keynote speakers.

==== Forest Day 4: Cancún, Mexico (2010) ====
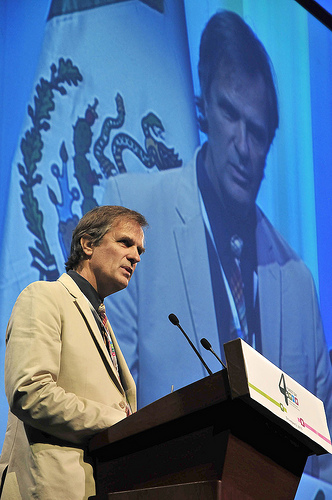
Daniel Nepstad during Forest Day 4, Cancún, Mexico

Forest Day 4 took place on 5 December 2010 in Cancún, Mexico. More than 1,500 people including over 280 Climate negotiators were in attendance.

The theme for Forest Day 4 was "Time to Act", highlighting the urgency of ensuring the survival of the world's forests, the biodiversity they embrace and the hundreds of millions of people who depend on them. The event served as a bridge between the International Year of Biodiversity and the 2011 International Year of Forests. Forest Day 4 was hosted by the Government of Mexico, through the National Forestry Commission (CONAFOR), CPF and CIFOR.

President Felipe Calderón Hinojosa, in his opening speech at FD4, told the plenary "… it’s time for all of us to push, and push hard for the full incorporation of REDD+ into a long-term international climate change agreement." In a passionate plea, the Mexican president also stressed, "Either we change our way of life now, or climate change will change it for us."

Keynote speeches by Daniel Nepstad, Director of the International Program at the Amazon Environmental Research Institute and Mirna Cunningham Kain, Chair of the Center for Autonomy and Development of Indigenous Peoples, emphasized the critical needs for both sound forestry and climate change science, and pro-active engagement with indigenous people and forest-dependent communities as the de facto and de jure custodians of land and forest resources to secure equitable outcomes. UN Under-Secretary-General for Economic and Social Affairs Sha Zukang provided an important forward-looking perspective, drawing participants' attention to the multiple benefits of forests and the International Year of Forests in 2011.

Key issues discussed at FD4 included:

- Harnessing REDD+ to sustainably manage forests and reduce poverty: The day saw the emergence of a robust consensus that the risks of no action on protecting the world's forests are far greater than the risks of moving ahead with less-than-perfect agreements.
- REDD+ provides a key and cost-effective opportunity to mitigate climate change: FD4 participants reaffirmed that through REDD+ we may significantly reduce, remove and avoid global emissions at reasonable cost, as long as we take due account of the rights and livelihoods of indigenous people and local communities, biodiversity and ecosystem services, whilst assisting developing forest countries adapt to climate change.
- The rights of indigenous people and forest-dependent communities need to be protected: Communities would be more willing to engage with REDD+ initiatives if they were to participate in all aspects of REDD+ design and implementation, if they are granted rights to the carbon in their forests, if they play a central role in the design of local rules, and if REDD+ does not permit more powerful competitors to threaten local interests.
- Additional financing is needed to implement REDD+ at scale: An agreement on a robust and predictable system for mobilizing financial resources from various sources is needed, primarily in developed countries. This will be needed to stimulate and pay for early REDD+ action at scale, technology transfers, capacity building and the development of national and sub-national monitoring, reporting and verification (MRV) systems, among others.
- Biodiversity conservation is a prerequisite for the success of REDD+: More than 90 percent of FD4 participants polled said that biodiversity safeguards are either "very important" or "essential" for the success of REDD+, and more than 95 percent said that it is important to monitor co-benefits.
- REDD+ and agricultural drivers of deforestation: FD4 participants proposed several options to increase agricultural intensification whilst reducing net annual rates of deforestation including: increasing production efficiencies; promoting multifunctional landscapes; directing REDD+ financing to increase efficiencies in agronomic practices; and shifting extensive production systems to low carbon landscapes.
- Promoting synergies between climate change mitigation and adaptation across landscapes: More research is needed to explore linkages between adaptation and mitigation in forests at different scales. Two specific challenges – agreement on monitoring, reporting and verification (MRV) systems, and continued improvements in forest governance were also discussed.
- Strengthen linkages between national and subnational MRV systems for REDD+: Challenges remain for monitoring forest degradation and peatland emissions but these may be overcome with significant additional capacity building and technology transfer, including the application of novel technologies. Examples include Google's Earth Engine (demonstrated by Rebecca Moore, Head of Google's Global Outreach Program prior to the Closing Plenary of FD4), ODK and androids for forest biomass measurements with communities.
- Improve accounting rules for forest management in developed countries: More comprehensive accounting on forests will be beneficial both for the climate and for forests. Participants acknowledged that this is a complex and controversial issue, but success in reaching agreement on new rules would help smooth the way for agreement on new emission reduction commitments by developing countries for the second commitment period of the Kyoto Protocol.
- The success of REDD+ strategies and projects will depend on whether they influence governance reforms or are shaped by existing governance failures: The ability of developing countries to enhance the role of their forest resources in mitigating climate change is closely linked with their commitment to governance reform. There are also huge challenges to reform the embedded structures of past poor governance. However, the legality and legitimacy of REDD+ are likely to depend on a balance between central oversight and decentralized decision making, clear tenure and transparent and equitable benefit-sharing arrangements.
- Reinforcing the UNFCCC momentum on forestry and climate change : A key challenge of COP16 in Cancún is how existing mitigation and financing pledges made through the Copenhagen Accord can now be transformed into official commitments under the UNFCCC. This may require abandoning the "nothing is agreed until everything is agreed" global climate change architecture approach to ensure that a balanced cluster of decisions can be made in negotiating areas that remain close to agreement. This will ensure that commitments can be translated into actions in 2011.

===== Comments =====
- Virgilio Viana, CEO of Amazonas Sustainable Foundation, Brazil: "Forest Day has become a venue for in depth discussion relating to forests and climate change, filling a gap in the meeting spaces. A source of inspiration for policy making at national and international level."
- Yemi Katerere, UN REDD: "FD provides the forum, agenda and a theme to draw together practitioners, policy makers, researchers and NGOs involved in forestry. FD is the place to get the experts’ view on forestry at COP... The CPF has a broad range of constituents; FD reflects this multi-faceted range of stakeholders."
- Felician Kilahama, Ministry of Natural Resources and Tourism, Tanzania: "FD is unique: It brings environmental stakeholders, policy makers, private sector, etc together. For some countries, FD provides a rare chance to interact internationally, exchange knowledge, lessons learned on forests and climate change."
- David Diaz, Ecosystem Marketplace (Forest Trends), USA: "There’s a lot of positive energy surrounding forestry right now and FD channels that energy. President Calderon’s presence has an impact. The participation of high profile figures means that other presidential/ministerial level people may get a louder voice or take an interest at that level."
- Tony la Vina, Dean, Ateneo School of Government, Manila University, Philippines: "FD is important because of the range of people who come: negotiators, practitioners, policy makers, advocates – the range is impressive. Here you can help shape the agenda for forestry. I would like to see a strong appeal to negotiators that things are already running on the ground. There’s a sense of urgency. The negotiations need to be relevant to things already happening on the ground."
- Niels Elers Koch, President, International Union of Forest Research Organizations: "Forest Day (FD) is the single most important science–policy interface in the forest sector, where researchers and policy makers meet."

==== Forest Day 5: Durban, South Africa (2011) ====
The 2011 COP 17 was hosted by Durban, South Africa, from 28 November to 9 December 2011. Forest Day 5 took place on 4 December 2011 in Durban, South Africa. CIFOR convened the event, which was co-hosted by 11 members of the Collaborative Partnership on Forests and the Government of South Africa through the Department of Agriculture, Forestry and Fisheries. More than 1,100 people from 82 countries attended, including 214 official climate-change negotiators and 65 media representatives.

The theme for Forest Day 5 was ‘From Policy to Practice’, aiming to inform the COP agenda and forest stakeholders on ways to implement the REDD+ agreement reached in Cancún in 2010 to produce social and environmental benefits, and to integrate forests into adaptation strategies on the ground. Organisers gave special attention to issues relevant to sub-Saharan Africa, to REDD+ issues facing the humid tropical forests of the Congo Basin, and to the improved management and use of Africa's dry forests areas.

The link between forests and food security was also one of the main themes of the day. The organisers of Forest Day 5 and Agriculture and Rural Development Day (which was held on 3 December 2012) coordinated in the months leading up to the events to identify opportunities for tie-ups between the two events. A number of joint, similar-themed discussion forums were held on climate-smart agriculture, agroforestry and food security.

As in past years, Forest Day 5 attracted several high-level speakers. In all, more than 60 speakers and panellists took part in Forest Day 5, with six of the ten keynotes presented by women.

==== Forest Day 6: Doha, Qatar (2012) ====
The 2012 UNFCCC COP 18 was hosted by Doha, Qatar, from 26 November to 7 December 2012. Forest Day 6 took place on the sidelines of COP 18, on 2 to 3 December 2012, and considered issues ranging from REDD+ financing to adaptation, desertification, reforestation and afforestation.

==== Global Landscapes Forum: Warsaw, Poland (2013) ====
In 2013, Forest Day merged with Agriculture and Rural Development Day to form the Global Landscapes Forum (GLF), with the inaugural event held in Warsaw, Poland alongside the 2013 United Nations Climate Change Conference (COP19).

=== Annual celebrations ===
2013

The inaugural International Day of Forests "was celebrated around the world through tree-planting and other community-level events, including art, photo and film as well as social media outreach".

2014

In 2014, the International Day of Forests focused on "each individual’s personal and unique connection with Forests", through a campaign entitled "My Forest | Our Future". A special event was held at the United Nations headquarters on "Women as agents of change for forests and sustainable development".

2015

The 2015 theme for the International Day of Forests was "Forests | Climate | Change".

2016

The theme selected to mark 2016's International Day of Forests was forests and water. Forests are key to the planet's supply of freshwater. Over 100 events were held in 55 countries to celebrate the Day. In Rome, FAO headquarters, a special event was held to highlight forests’ crucial role in contributing to water and food security.

2017

The 2017 theme for the International Day of Forests was "Forests and Energy". The official FAO web pages lists 19 events held to celebrate the IFD in 2017.

2018

The theme of the International Day of Forests in 2018 was "Forests and Sustainable Cities".

2019

The 2019 theme for the International Day of Forests was "Forests and Education".

2020

The central theme for the International Day of Forests 2020, which was chosen by the Collaborative Partnership on Forests, was "Forests and Biodiversity: Too precious to lose".

2021

The theme of International Forest Day in 2021 was "Forest restoration: the path to recovery and welfare."

2022

The theme of International Forest Day in 2022 was "Forests and sustainable production and consumption".

2023

The theme of International Forest Day in 2023 was "Healthy forest for healthy people".

2024

The theme of International Forest Day in 2024 was "Forests and Innovation".

2025

The theme of International Forest Day in 2025 was "Forests, crucial ecosystems for food security".

== See also ==
- Arbor Day
- Awareness day
- International observance
- International Year of Forests (2011)
- Global Landscapes Forum (GLF)
- List of commemorative days
- List of environmental dates
- United Nations Forum on Forests
