= Lygodactylus lobeke =

Scientific classification
- Kingdom: Animalia
- Phylum: Chordata
- Class: Reptilia
- Order: Squamata
- Suborder: Gekkota
- Family: Gekkonidae
- Genus: Lygodactylus
- Species: L. lobeke

Binomial name
- Lygodactylus lobeke Röll & Pinto & Lobón-Rovira, 2024

Species of lizard

Lygodactylus lobeke, or the Lobeke dwarf gecko, is a species of gecko.

== Discovery ==
The gecko was discovered in Cameroon's Lobéké rainforest in 2002 by researchers, who found and captured a specimen, and kept it in a terrarium for five years. They suspected it was a new species but were unsure until finding a similar specimen in Cabinda, Angola in 2023. This second specimen was a male discovered in "a case of barcoding".

== Description ==
Considered "moderately sized", the Lobeke dwarf gecko is about 2.5 inches in length. Leaves are the gecko's preferred resting spot.

The male and the female do not differ in coloration. Researchers found that in captivity, the female showed "distinct 'mood dependent' colorations". There were four different colorations representing "neutral", "stressed", "display", and "pyjamas" states:

- Neutral: The gecko was described as "beige" or "light brown", with a speckling of darker brown and lighter cream blotches"
- Stressed: A darker brown hue, with the gecko's speckles "richer in contrast"
- Display: A "pale creamy brown color with very few speckles"
- Pyjamas: Called this due to being the gecko's coloration while sleeping during night, hence it being the gecko's "pyjamas", in which the gecko is an "olive brown hue with pale sides" that seemingly match the leaves
