= Racquel Moses =

Climate finance CEO, Trinidad and Tobago

- Born: Barataria
- Alma mater: Bishop Anstey High School; Georgia Tech
- Occupation: Chief executive officer
- Employer: Caribbean Climate-Smart Accelerator (2019–); Microsoft
- Website: racquelmoses.com

External videos
- “COP27 Interview with Racquel Moses CEO at The Caribbean Climate Smart Accelerator”, United Nations Caribbean, 2022
- Climate & Cocktails with Racquel Moses: A Just Future In the Caribbean, COP27, Mar 16, 2023
- Caribbean climate solutions creation, Racquel Moses, CEO of Caribbean Climate-Smart Accelerator, High-Level Climate Champions, Oct 18, 2023

Racquel Moses is a Global Ambassador for the United Nations Framework Convention on Climate Change (UNFCCC) and the Chief Executive Officer for the Caribbean Climate-Smart Accelerator (CCSA). Moses has represented the region at COP26-28, presenting a climate scorecard for rating the status and progress of countries at COP26 and a climate smart map for the Caribbean region at COP28.

Through the Caribbean Climate-Smart Accelerator, Moses connects governments, countries, funders, investors, technology developers and stakeholders to support a wide range of development and implementation initiatives in the Caribbean region. Projects have included public transit systems, use of electric or hydrogen for vehicles, food sustainability, remediation of plastic waste, plastics reuse in concrete, and sustainable use of ocean resources.

== Early life and education ==
Racquel Goddard (later Moses) was born in Barataria, Trinidad and Tobago. She attended Bishop Anstey High School and pursued interests in organizational psychology and law before completing her Masters in Management of Technology at the Georgia Institute of Technology in 2000.

Moses is a marathon runner.

== Career ==
Under her maiden name of Racquel Goddard, Moses was regional vice-president for Enterprise Sales at LIME Jamaica in 2012 and regional vice-president for Fujitsu Caribbean. In Jamaica, she founded iDaedle Consulting Ltd. As Managing Director of iDaedle she was selected to attend the 5th Global Forum on Innovation and Technology Entrepreneurship, held by infoDev in East London, South Africa in 2013.

Moses became President of the Investment Promotion Agency of Trinidad & Tobago (InvesTT) as of November 25, 2013. Moses improved the agency's World Bank score by 77%, receiving awards that acknowledged the agency's world-class performance under her leadership.

By 2017, Moses was serving as Head of Microsoft Trinidad and Tobago. By 2018, she was regional director for the public sector of Microsoft Caribbean.

In 2017, Moses was appointed to the Trinidad and Tobago Olympic Committee (TTOC) which she has served on the Executive Board and as a Trustee. In March 2024, she delivered the feature address at the ninth Sport Industry TT Conference of the Trinidad and Tobago Olympic Committee. The conference theme was "The Environmental Impact of Sport".

Moses decided to focus on addressing climate change after the birth of her daughter in 2018. Formation of the Caribbean Climate-Smart Accelerator (CCSA) was announced on August 9, 2018 with support from the Inter-American Development Bank (IDB), Virgin Group, and the World Bank, in part as a response to the devastation of Hurricanes Maria and Irma in 2017. As of January 9, 2019, Moses became CEO of the Caribbean Climate-Smart Accelerator.

CCSA became a nonprofit entity as of 2020. The coalition represents 28 Caribbean countries and more than 40 million people. At the accelerator, Moses works to match climate smart projects with different types of philanthropic funding: grant funding, loan funding and investment funding. CCSA also supports projects through its financial advisory committee and forums for investors. CCSA acts as an official nominator for the yearly Earthshot Prize.

Moses works with the Caribbean Renewable Energy Forum (CREF) and its Island Resilience Action Challenge (IRAC), which was formed in 2019. IRAC is a yearly initiative bringing together island stakeholders together to build consensus and act on solutions to address climate change. IRAC is supported by the Advanced Energy Group and the Caribbean Development Bank.

One of IRAC's initiatives has been the development of a resilience scorecard that can be used to assess both the commitments and accomplishments of countries in adaptation and mitigation of climate change. Moses shared the scorecard internationally at COP26. A further step has been the development of a climate smart map which tracks climate action data from 28 countries in the Caribbean region. The map was developed through a partnership between CCSA and Price Waterhouse Coopers (PwC) and announced by Moses and others at COP28 in Dubai.

At COP28, in addition to presenting innovative solutions and advocating for financing for climate-resilience, Moses supported the implementation of the Loss and Damage Fund. The Caribbean region is a net contributor of less than 1% of global carbon emissions, but suffers disproportionately from adverse weather events. Damage in the region accounts for nearly 40% of total global damage. There is strong support for conversion to renewable energy sources and energy independence in the region. Over half of Caribbean countries aim to produce over 50% of electricity from renewables and 10 countries aim to produce 100% of their electricity from renewables. Costa Rica had achieved its goal of 100% renewable energy and Suriname had achieved its goal of 35% as of 2023.

As of 2021, Moses was chosen as a Global Ambassador for the United Nations' Race to Zero & Race to Resilience. Other Global Ambassadors included Michael Bloomberg, Susan Chomba, and Saleemul Huq. Moses was the only one of the Global Ambassadors to come from a Small Island Developing State (SIDS).

Moses has served on the jury of the Island Innovation Awards, first given by Island Innovation and the Clinton Global Initiative in 2021.

== Awards and honors ==
- 2013, World Bank innovation award
