= Eliane Ubalijoro =

Rwandan researcher

Dr.Eliane Ubalijoro
- Born: Eliane Ubalijoro; 1972 (age 53–54)
- Citizenship: Rwanda Canada
- Education: McGill University
- Known for: First woman Director of a CGIAR Research Center Presidential Advisory council for Rwandan President Paul Kagame Sustainable development and global health Initiatives
- Awards: 2022 International Leadership Association Fellow(International Science Council)
- Scientific career
- Workplaces: McGill University Global Open Data in Agriculture International Forestry Research and World Agroforestry(CIFOR-ICRAF) Canada Hub(Future Earth) Gates Foundation Grand Challenges

Eliane Ubalijoro is a scientist and executive of Rwanda-Canada. She specializes in sustainable development and global health initiatives.

== Early life and education ==
She was born in Rwanda in 1972. She obtained her PHD in Molecular Genetics from McGill University. She has a background in Agriculture and Molecular Genetics.

== Career ==
Ubalijoro serves as a Chief Executive Officer of the Center for International Forestry Research and World Agroforestry (CIFOR-ICRAF), dealing with environmental challenges, food security worldwide and climate resilience. Ubalijoro is the first African woman Director of a CGIAR Research Center. She was an Executive Director of Sustainability in the Digital Age and the Canada Hub Director for future Earth from 2021 to March 2023. In a Montreal-based biotechnology company, she was a scientific director. Ubalijoro also undertook some consulting work in Haiti and Africa in relation to sustainable climate-resilient economic growth. And also consultant for The Innovation Partnership (TIP).

Eliane Ubalijoro has been a Professor of Practice for Public-Private Sector Partnerships at McGill University's Institute for the Study of International Development since 2008. She serves at Gates Foundation Grand Challenges in Global Health Phase 2 project as a Project Manager. She was previously an Assistant Professor in the Faculty of Agriculture and Environmental Sciences at McGill.

In September 2019 she joined the Global Open Data in Agriculture (GODAN) where she served as a Deputy Executive Director of Programs.

== Notable memberships ==
- Global Alliance for a Sustainable Planet (Impact Advisory Board member)
- Rwanda's National Science and Technology Council (member)
- Presidential Advisory Council for Rwandan President Paul Kagame (member since 2007)
- Expert Consultation Group on Post COVID-19 Implications for Genomics Research (member)
- African Development Bank's Expert Global Community on COVID-19 Response Strategies (member)
- Capitals Coalition Supervisory Board (member)
- Earth Leadership Program Advisory Board (member)
- Advisory Boards of ShEquity and Orango Investment Corporation (member)
- Boards of Genome Canada and the Crop Trust (member)
- FemStep(member)

== Notable work ==
She is the Executive Director and Founder of C.L.E.A.R International Development Inc.,

== Recognition ==
She received the 2022 International Leadership Association's award for outstanding practice in women and leadership. She was also appointed as a fellow of the International Science Council honoring her contributions to advancing science as a global public good.

== Selected publications ==
- Dufresne, Philippe J; Ubalijoro, Eliane; Fortin, Marc G; Laliberte, Jean-François (1 September 2008). "Arabidopsis thaliana class II poly (A)-binding proteins are required for efficient multiplication of turnip mosaic virus". Journal of General Virology. 89 (9): 2339–2348. doi:10.1099/vir.0.2008/002139-0. PMID 18753244.
- Dufresne, Philippe J.; Thivierge, Karine; Cotton, Sophie; Beauchmin, Chantal; Ide, Christine; Ubalijoro, Eliane; Laliberté, Jean-François; Fortin, Marc G. (25 April 2008). "Heat shock 70 protein interaction with Turnip mosaic virus RNA-dependent RNA polymerase within virus-induced membrane vesicles". Virology. 374 (1): 217–227. doi:10.1016/j.virol.2007.12.014. PMID 18222516.
