= Central African Forest Commission =

Intergovernmental organisation

The Central African Forest Commission (French: Commission des Forêts d'Afrique Centrale, or COMIFAC) is an intergovernmental organisation in Central Africa. Its goal is to manage the forests of Central Africa in a sustainable manner and is supported by the wildlife trade monitoring network TRAFFIC. The secretariat is based in Yaoundé, Cameroon. Raymond Mbitikon serves as its Executive Secretary.

Its four official languages are French, English, Spanish and Portuguese.

== Member states ==
The Central African Forest Commission's eleven member states are:

- Angola
- Burundi
- Cameroon
- Chad
- Central African Republic
- Democratic Republic of the Congo
- Equatorial Guinea
- Gabon
- Republic of the Congo
- Rwanda
- São Tomé and Príncipe

== History ==
COMIFAC was established in March 1999, through the "Declaration of Yaoundé". In February 2005, the organization adopted a "Convergence Plan for improved management and conservation of forests in Central Africa."

== OFAC ==
Established in 2007, the Central African Forest Observatory (OFAC) is a specialized unit of the COMIFAC, which provides up-to-date and relevant data on the forests and ecosystems of the region, with the aim of informing policy-making and to promote better governance and sustainable management of natural resources.

== See also ==
- Congo Basin Forest Partnership
- Dzanga-Sangha Special Reserve
- Economic and Monetary Community of Central Africa
- Lobéké National Park
- Nouabalé-Ndoki National Park
