= Susan Chomba =

Kenyan scientist

- Born: Kirinyaga County
- Education: Moi University, BSc; Bangor University, MSc; University of Copenhagen, MSc, PhD
- Employer(s): International Centre for Research in Agroforestry, World Resources Institute
- Known for: Environmental scientist

Susan Chomba is a Kenyan scientist and environmentalist. She is a director at the World Resources Institute. Chomba is a member of the African Academy of Sciences and has served as an associate editor for the political ecology section of the academic journal Frontiers in Human Dynamics. She has also participated in international advisory panels on sustainable food systems and landscape restoration. Chomba has contributed to research and policy development on climate change, forest governance, and sustainable food systems in Africa. Her work focuses on forest landscape restoration, agroforestry, and improving rural livelihoods through sustainable land management. She has worked with governments, development partners, and local communities to promote evidence-based approaches to environmental conservation and agricultural transformation across Africa.

== Biography ==
Chomba grew up in poverty in Kirinyaga County. Chomba was largely raised by her grandmother as her mother, a single parent, was always working. Chomba's mother grew capsicum and French beans on a small plot of land owned by a step-uncle and created a farming cooperative.

When Chomba was nine, a local boarding school rejected her due to her poverty, so she attended one further away, in Western Kenya. When her mother was no longer able to afford to send her there, Chomba returned to Kirinyaga to attend the provincial high school. Each student in the school was given a patch of land to farm. Chomba experimented with organic farming, growing cabbage to withstand the cold climate.

Although Chomba had hoped to study law or agricultural economics, she was placed in a forestry course at Moi University. In her third year, when taking an agroforestry class, she found her calling.

Chomba joined the International Centre for Research in Agroforestry, where she led "Regreening Africa", an eight-country land restoration program that restored one million hectares of degraded land in Africa.

Chomba was a member of the first cohort to graduate with a dual European master's degree in Sustainable Tropical Forestry from Bangor University and the University of Copenhagen. She completed fieldwork in Tanzania. She continued to get her PhD in forest governance at the University of Copenhagen.

In 2021, Chomba joined the World Resources Institute as their Director of Vital Landscapes for Africa, where she leads their work on "Forests, Food systems and People." She is also a global ambassador for the Race to Zero and Race to Resilience under the UN High Level Champions for Climate Action.

== Awards ==
- Peter Henry Forestry Postgraduate Award, first recipient, Bangor University
- 2016: 16 Women Restoring the Earth, Global Landscapes Forum
- 2022: 25 women shaping climate action globally, Greenbiz
- In 2023 Chomba was included in the 100 Women (BBC) list, which features 100 inspiring and influential women from around the world for their contributions to society and global development.
- 2024: Honorary Doctorate - Bangor University for public service (including health).
