= Center for International Forestry Research =

Non-profit scientific research organization

Center for International Forestry Research (CIFOR)
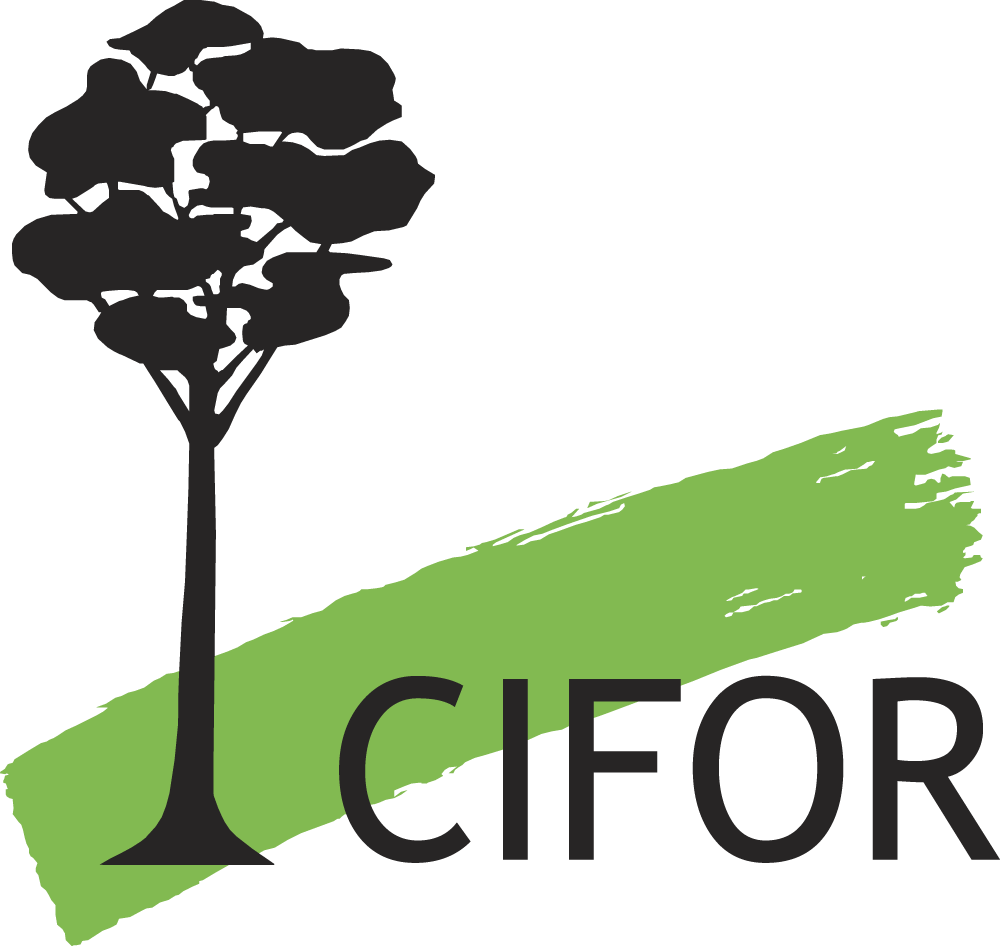
- Logo
- Abbreviation: CIFOR
- Formation: 5 March 1993 (33 years ago)
- Type: Non-profit organization
- Headquarters: Bogor, Indonesia
- Region served: Worldwide
- Director-General: Robert Nasi (2017–)
- Previous Director Generals: Peter Holmgren (2012–2017), Frances Seymour (2006–2012), David Kaimowitz (2001–2006), Jeff Sayer (1993–2001)
- Website: www.cifor.org

The Center for International Forestry Research (CIFOR) is a non-profit scientific research organization that conducts research on the use and management of forests with a focus on tropical forests in developing countries. CIFOR, which merged with World Agroforestry (known by the acronym ICRAF) on 1 January 2019, is the forestry and agroforestry research center of CGIAR, a network of 15 research centers around the world that focus on agricultural research for sustainable development, working closely with governments and other partners to help develop evidence-based solutions to problems related to sustainable agriculture and natural resource management.

CIFOR-ICRAF research is intended to "deliver actionable evidence and solutions to transform how land is used and how food is produced: conserving and restoring ecosystems, responding to the global climate, malnutrition, biodiversity and desertification crises." It also contributes to the United Nations Sustainable Development Goals, commitments under the Rio Convention, including the Paris agreement and the UN Framework Convention on Climate Change.

== Overview ==
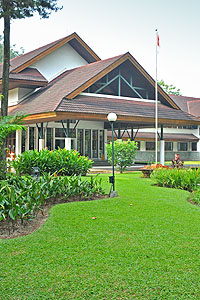
CIFOR's headquarters in Bogor, Indonesia.

CIFOR's research and expert analysis help policy makers and practitioners shape policy, improve the management of tropical forests and address the needs of people who depend on forests for their livelihoods. CIFOR's multidisciplinary approach considers the underlying drivers of deforestation and degradation, which often lie outside the forestry sector: forces such as agriculture, infrastructure development, trade and investment policies, and law enforcement.

CIFOR has its headquarters in Bogor, Indonesia. The current Director General is Robert Nasi. It has three regional offices: in Burkina Faso (West Africa), Cameroon (Central Africa) and Kenya (East and South Africa). It has project offices in Ethiopia and Zambia (Africa), Vietnam and Laos (Asia), and Brazil and Peru (Latin America). CIFOR is one of 15 centers within the Consultative Group on International Agricultural Research (CGIAR).

In implementing its research, CIFOR collaborates with other centers within the CGIAR – the World Agroforestry Centre, the International Center for Tropical Agriculture (CIAT) and Bioversity International – to conduct the CGIAR Consortium Research Programme Forests, Trees and Agroforestry (also known as CRP6). CRP6 objective is to enhance the management and use of forests, agroforestry and tree genetic resources across the landscape, from forests to farms.

== History ==
Although many link CIFOR's creation to the 1992 Earth Summit because it came into existence the following year, the discussions that led to founding CIFOR predated the Earth Summit by several years. In 1991, the CGIAR appointed the Australian Centre for International Agricultural Research (ACIAR) as the implementing agency responsible for establishing CIFOR and setting up a board of trustees. CIFOR's Establishment Agreement was signed by Australia, Sweden, Switzerland, and the United States; the Agreement was lodged with the United Nations and CIFOR's legal identity as an international organisation was consolidated with a Host Country Agreement between the new Board and the Government of Indonesia in May 1993.

Over time, CIFOR increased the focus of its research on forest policy rather than on technical forestry or tree breeding, in order to complement the efforts of national and private-sector institutes. Instead of having laboratories, CIFOR would be a 'center without walls', marshaling interdisciplinary research teams in collaboration with partners to tackle forest policy changes.

== Partners ==
CIFOR works with government agencies and non-governmental organization in the countries where its scientists conduct research. Top partners include the CGIAR, European Union, Norwegian Agency for Development Cooperation (NORAD), Australian Department of Foreign Affairs and Trade (Australian Aid), US Agency for International Development (USAID), BMZ/BMUB, Global Environment Facility (GEF), International Fund for Agricultural Development (IFAD), Finnish Ministry for Foreign Affairs, Austrian Development Agency, British Department for International Development (DFID), French Global Environment Facility, and Swiss Agency for Development and Cooperation.

== Strategy ==
CIFOR's first strategy, set out in 1996, provided the foundations and direction for research that affected the understanding and practice of forest management throughout the tropics. But the world's forests and the way they are perceived have changed dramatically since CIFOR was established.

Foremost among many changes is that forests are today centre-stage in the global debate on how to tackle climate change. Almost 20 per cent of global carbon emissions are caused by deforestation, and so curbing forest loss is a way to reduce global warming. Also the promotion of biofuels by governments concerned about global warming is driving forest clearance in some areas.

To respond to these and other challenges, CIFOR devised a new strategy for a new era. Approved by the Board of Trustees in May 2008, the strategy will guide CIFOR's work until 2018.

== CGIAR Research Programme on Forests, Trees and Agroforestry ==
CIFOR is the leading center for the CGIAR Research Programme 'Forests, Trees and Agroforestry' (also known as CRP6). This initiative brings together four Centers who specialise in their respective subjects—the World Agroforestry Centre (ICRAF), CIFOR, the International Center for Tropical Agriculture (CIAT) and Bioversity International. The programme will convene expertise across the CGIAR system, and will partner with research and practitioner organisations around the world.

Within the consortium research program, the research focus is organised into five components with the clear objective of enhancing the management and use of forests, agroforestry and tree genetic resources across the landscape from forests to farms.

=== Component 1: Smallholder production systems and markets ===
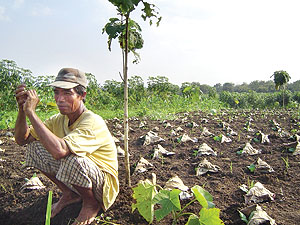
CRP6 Component 1 focuses on the needs of smallholder producers.

Component 1 focuses on the needs of smallholder producers, with an emphasis on enhancing the productivity of trees on farms (e.g. through domestication of wild species) and improving access for smallholders to markets for forest and tree products.

Research themes

- Enhancing management and production systems for smallholders (food security and nutrition)
- Increasing income generation and market integration for smallholders
- Improving policies and institutions to enhance social assets to secure rights in forest- and tree-dependent communities

=== Component 2: Management and conservation of forest and tree resources ===
Component 2 focuses on the needs of forest managers at the level of the forest management unit, with an emphasis on improved technical and governance approaches to conserving forest ecosystems and the genetic resources they contain.

Research themes

- Understanding threats to tree species and formulating genetic conservation strategies
- Conserving and characterising high-quality germplasm of tree crops and their wild relatives
- Developing improved silvicultural, monitoring and management practices for multiple use
- Developing tools and methods to resolve conflicts over distribution of benefits and resource rights

=== Component 3: Environmental services and landscape management ===
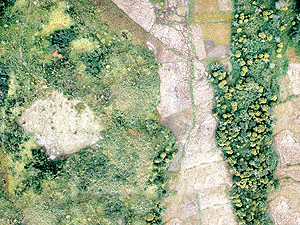
CRP6 Component 3 has an emphasis on capturing the value of environmental services.

Component 3 focuses on the needs of landscape-level planners and stakeholders, with an emphasis on mechanisms (such as payments for environmental services or PES) for capturing the value of environmental services and for negotiating trade-offs among competing conservation and development objectives.

Research themes

- Understanding drivers of forest transition
- Understanding the consequences of forest transition for environmental services and livelihoods

=== Component 4: Climate change adaptation and mitigation ===
Component 4 focuses on the needs of policymakers and land managers seeking to build forests, trees and agroforestry into climate change adaptation and mitigation strategies.

Research themes

- Harnessing forests, trees and agroforestry for climate change mitigation
- Enhancing climate change adaptation
- Understanding synergies between climate change mitigation and adaptation

=== Component 5: Impacts of trade and investment on forests and people ===
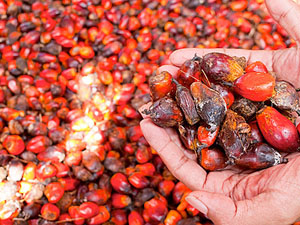
CRP6 Component 5 aims to manage the effect of trade and investment on forests and forest-dependent communities.

Component 5 focuses on the needs of policymakers and land managers seeking to ensure that the effects of globalised trade and investment flows are beneficial to forests and the communities that depend on forests for their livelihoods.

Research themes

- Understanding the processes and effects of forest-related trade and investment
- Enhancing responses and policy options to mitigate the harm and enhance the benefits of trade and investment

== Other major projects ==
=== Global Comparative Study on REDD+ ===
Over four years, CIFOR and its partner organizations are undertaking a major global comparative study on the implementation of pilot REDD+ (Reducing Emissions from Deforestation and forest Degradation) projects.

The aim of the study is to compare how pilot REDD+ projects are working at national and subnational levels, and share lessons learned from these comparisons for the benefit of everyone involved in designing and implementing REDD+ projects. Essentially, by providing policy makers and communities with this information, the project aims to ensure implementation of REDD+ is as effective, cost-efficient and equitable as possible – and ultimately reduces carbon emissions, deforestation and forest degradation across the world, while producing benefits like poverty alleviation and biodiversity conservation.

Research for the global comparative study is being undertaken in 11 countries, including Bolivia, Brazil, Cameroon, the Democratic Republic of Congo, Indonesia, Nepal, Peru, Tanzania and Vietnam.

=== Poverty and Environment Network ===
The Poverty and Environment Network (PEN) is an international research project and network launched by CIFOR in September 2004 and completed in 2010. PEN still exists as a database containing survey data on more than 8,000 households in more than 40 study sites in 25 developing countries.

It was the largest and most comprehensive global analysis of tropical forests and poverty, and aimed to put a systematic framework of knowledge around the role tropical forests play in poverty alleviation. The project aimed to provide data on the ways that poor people depend on forest resources, in order to both inform mainstream forest policy design and to contribute to the design of policies and projects to alleviate poverty, and thereby contribute to meeting the Millennium Development Goal of 50% poverty reduction by 2015.

In order for the socioeconomic data to be uniform and therefore comparable across countries and project sites, research partners (mainly PhD students) from a number of universities and research institutes collected quarterly data at the household and village level using standardized definitions, questionnaires and methods. The study sites were chosen to obtain representative coverage of geographical regions, forest types, forest tenure regimes, levels of poverty, infrastructure and market access, and population density.

Preliminary results from the study’s global database showed that among those surveyed, forest income – on average – constituted more than one fifth of total household income, while environmental income (forest and non-forest) made up more than one fourth.

== Communicating research ==
According to past Director General Frances Seymour, CIFOR considers bridging the gap between research, policy and practice through effective communications is one of its challenges as a research organization. The organization is committed to sharing its research and other information with others in the research community, and also with policymakers, indigenous and community groups, donor agencies, the media and the general public.

=== Forests News Blog ===
The Forests News Blog reports on the latest scientific research, activities and events from CIFOR. It contains news stories, analysis, features, videos and infographics. Sections of the blog include: climate change and energy, human wellbeing, forest management and restoration, food and diets, gender, justice and tenure, value chains and finance, landscapes and the Director General's column.

=== Social media ===
CIFOR has a Twitter account, YouTube channel and Facebook page.

=== Major events ===
==== Forests Asia Summit ====
The Forests Asia Summit in Jakarta saw ministers from across Southeast Asia join CEOs, civil society leaders, development experts and the world's top scientists joining to share knowledge on how the region can accelerate the shift toward a green economy by better managing its forests and landscapes.

The Summit – organized by the Center for International Forestry Research and co-hosted by the Indonesian Ministry of Forestry – was the largest in Asia in recent years and attracted more than 1,000 leading stakeholders from Southeast Asia and across the world. Thousands more participated online or through nationwide broadcasts. There were special learning events with leading global experts on the Green Economy, the Southeast Asian haze crisis, climate change negotiations and the Sustainable Development Goals.

==== Forest Day ====
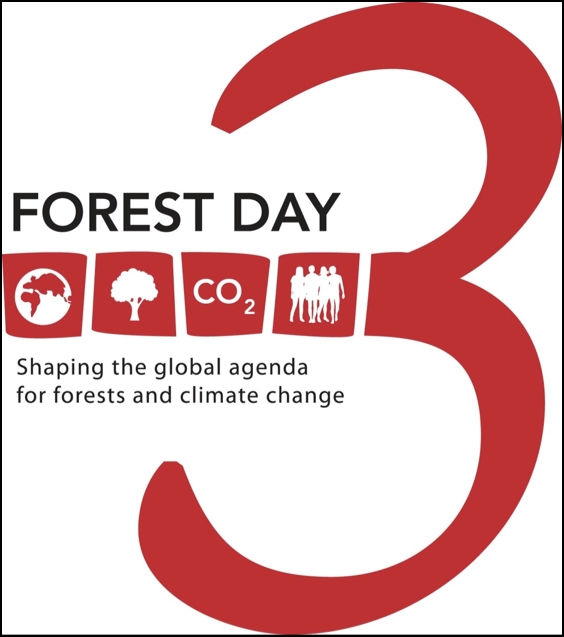
Forest Day 3 logo.

Forest Day is a platform for those with an interest in forests and climate change to come together with others and exchange views. Forest Day is organized by CIFOR on behalf of the Collaborative Partnership on Forests. It is held alongside the United Nations Framework Convention on Climate Change Conference of Parties (COP).

More than 1,100 people from 82 countries, including 214 official climate-change negotiators and 65 media representatives, attended Forest Day 5 on 4 December 2011 in Durban, South Africa. Previous Forest Days have been held in Bali, Indonesia (2007), Poznań, Poland (2008), Copenhagen, Denmark (2009) and Cancún, Mexico (2010). The 2012 Forest Day (Forest Day 6) coincided with COP 18 in Doha, Qatar, in December 2012.

==== Forests Indonesia Conference ====
As part of the United Nations declaration of 2011 as the 'International Year of Forests', CIFOR convened the Forests Indonesia (Hutan Indonesia) conference on 27 September 2011 at Shangri-La Hotel in Jakarta. About 1,000 participants representing government, business/private sector, civil society and donor organizations attended the conference to discuss the future of Indonesia's forests, which comprise the world's third largest tropical forest area.

The President of Indonesia, Susilo Bambang Yudhoyono, opened the conference and vowed to dedicate the last three years of his administration to safeguarding his nation's rainforests.

==== Global Landscapes Forum ====
The Global Landscapes Forum is an annual conference held alongside the UN climate negotiations to create a platform for positioning landscapes in the new international agreements on climate and sustainable development.

The events bring together thousands of negotiators, world leaders, researchers, civil society leaders, business leaders, practitioners and policymakers in agriculture, forestry and development, as well as representatives from funding organizations and media. Forum participants join an process of seeking solutions to global issues.

== Publications ==
Scientific results are made available to the international scientific community and policymakers through publications in international journals, policy briefs and training materials. In addition, CIFOR also disseminates its results in non-English journals, policy briefs, CD-ROMs and manuals.

== See also ==
- 1993 in the environment
- Australian Centre for International Agricultural Research (ACIAR)
- Bioversity International
- Collaborative Partnership on Forests (CPF)
- Consultative Group on International Agricultural Research (CGIAR)
- International Center for Tropical Agriculture (CIAT)
- United Nations Forum on Forests (UNFF)
- United Nations Framework Convention on Climate Change (UNFCCC)
- World Agroforestry Centre (ICRAF)
- The CGIAR Research Program on Forests, Trees and Agroforestry (FTA)
