= Lobéké National Park =

National park in Cameroon

- IUCN category II (national park)
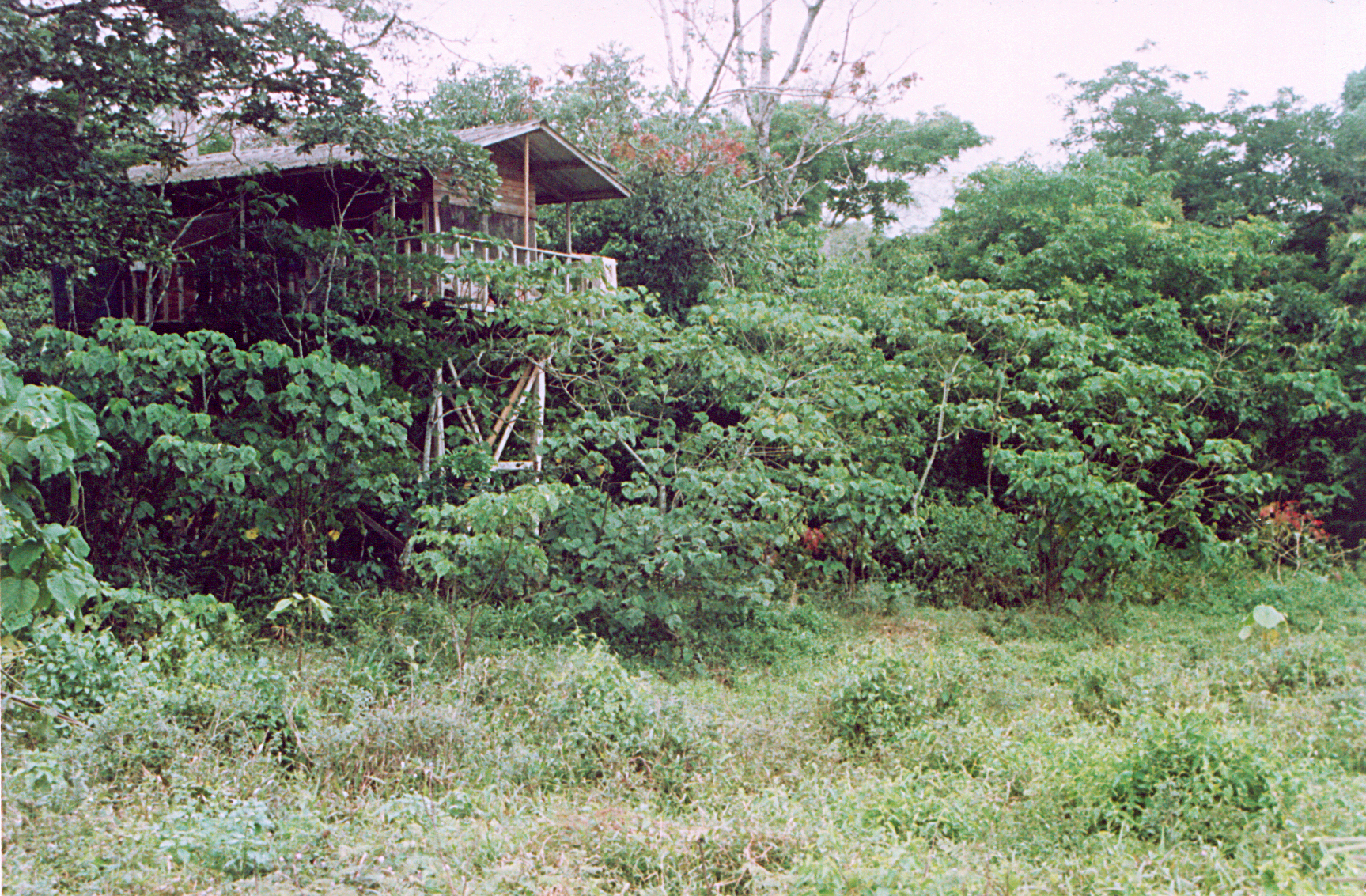
- Rainforest in Lobéké National Park

- Location within Cameroon
- Location: Cameroon
- Nearest city: Moloundou
- Coordinates: 2°15′N 15°45′E
- Area: 2,178 km^{2} (841 sq mi)
- Established: October 1999

Lobéké National Park is a national park in southeastern Cameroon, located within the Congo Basin along the border with the Central African Republic and the Republic of the Congo. Established in October 1999, it covers approximately 2,178 square kilometres (841 sq mi) of tropical rainforest and forms part of the Sangha Trinational, a transboundary conservation complex shared with Dzanga-Ndoki National Park in the Central African Republic and Nouabalé-Ndoki National Park in the Republic of the Congo. The Sangha Trinational was designated a UNESCO World Heritage Site in 2012.

The park is internationally recognised for its extensive Congo Basin rainforest, large populations of African forest elephants and western lowland gorillas, and its network of mineral-rich forest clearings known as bais, which attract a remarkable diversity of wildlife.

== History ==
Already in 1991, the WWF had conducted a biological assessment of the area and recommended that the Lobéké area be protected, recommending that the unexploited 40,000 hectares be expanded to encompass over 400,000 hectares. In October 1999, the park was declared a National Park. In the same year the so-called Yaoundé Declaration was signed, forming a tri-national park agreement of cooperation with Dzanga-Sangha Forest Reserve in the Central African Republic and the Nouabalé-Ndoki National Park in the Republic of Congo. This tri-park area, called the Sangha Trinational is operated by the Central African Forest Commission (COMIFAC), and is overlooked and funded by international wildlife groups such as the World Wildlife Fund, the German Cooperation of Technical Collaboration (GTZ) and the Wildlife Conservation Society (WCS). In 2012, the entire Sangha Trinational protected area (including Lobéké National Park) became a World Heritage Site.

== Geography ==
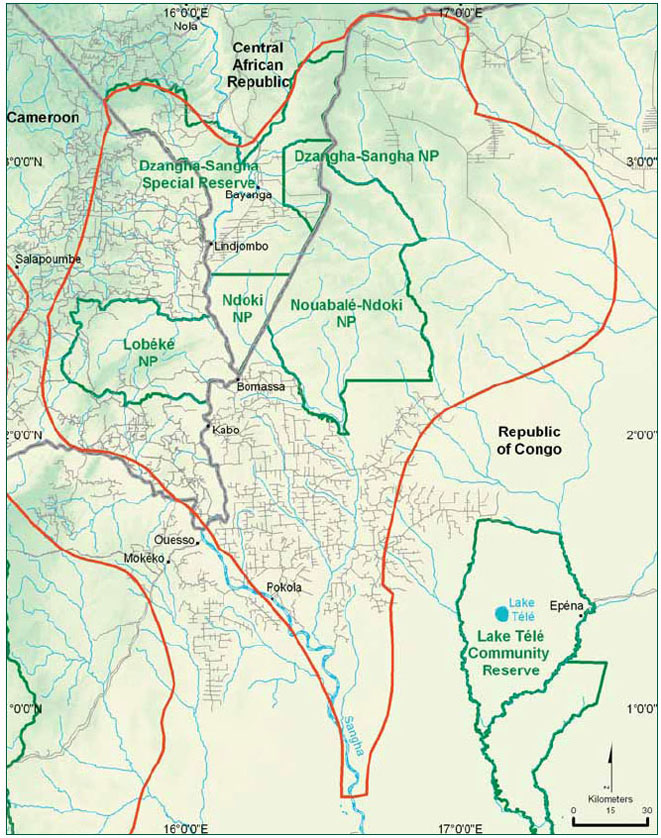
The Sangha Tri National Landscape. The park is labelled.

Lobéké National Park belongs to the Moloundou arrondissement, located in the vicinity of Boumba-et-Ngoko. Historically, the Moloundou area was one of the principal rubber-producing regions of southeastern Cameroon during the colonial period and the Germans established a rubber making plant in the area. The park is located close to the borders with neighbouring Republic of Congo and Central African Republic, which is why the tri-national environmental initiative with the park and Dzanga-Sangha Forest Reserve and the Nouabalé-Ndoki National Park was made. The park covers 1,838.55 km^{2} (709.87 sq mi), and its altitude ranges from 300 m (980 ft) to 750 m (2,460 ft) above sea level. More than twelve natural savannas, characterized as saline swamps, occur within the park. There are also sandbars on the Sangha. The annual rainfall averages 1400 mm., with the dry season occurring from December through February. Large forest clearings, or bais, have soils rich in various minerals that attract the mega fauna of the forest. Lobéké is the home of many different ethnic groups including the Baka, the Bantu and the Bangando.

Some of the highest densities of African forest elephants and western lowland gorillas in all of Africa are found in Lobéké. Other animals include chimpanzees, gorillas, leopards, as well as ten species of forest ungulates.

== Conservation ==
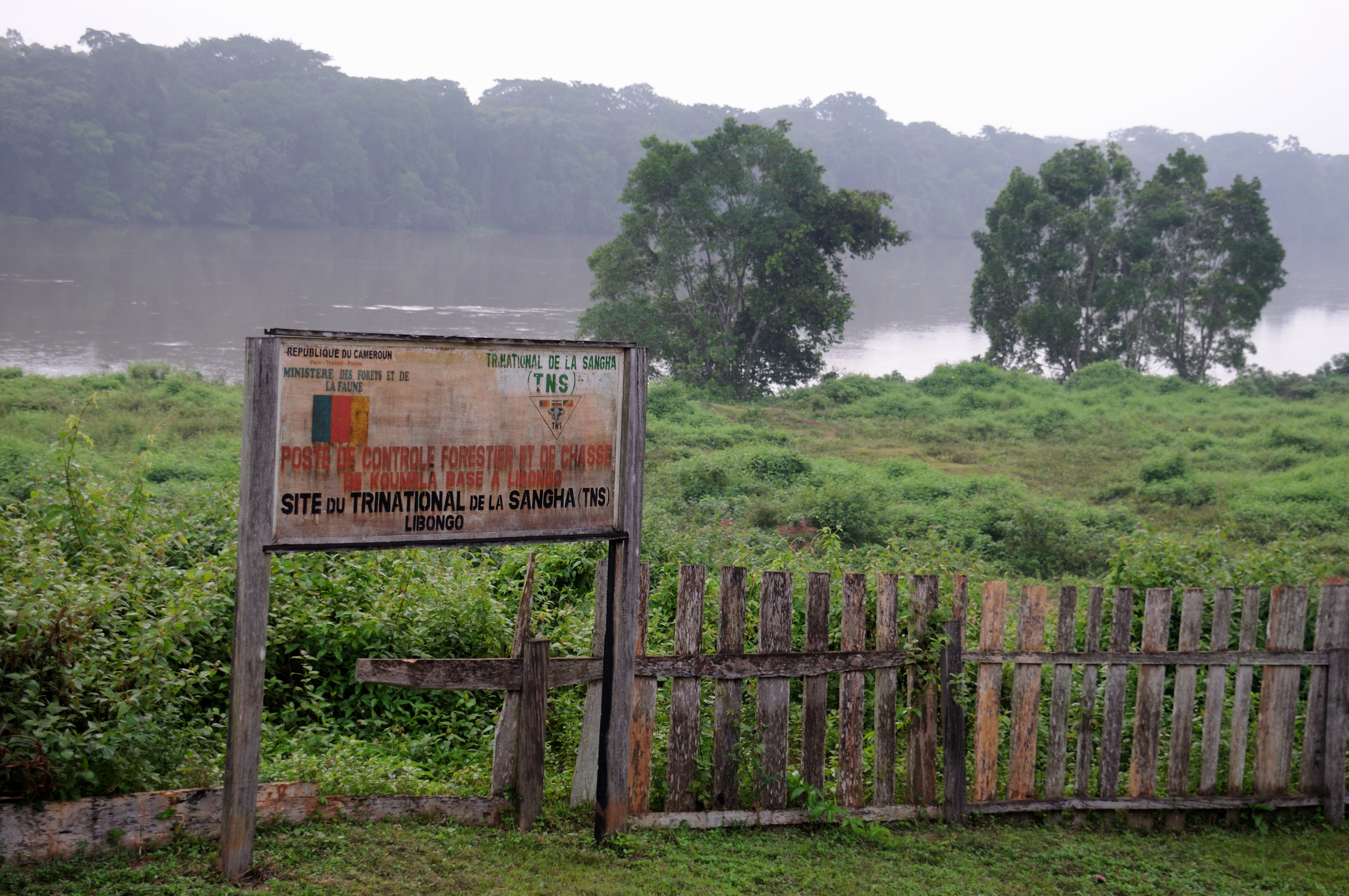
Forest and wildlife control post at Libongo, near Lobéké National Park, forming part of the Sangha Trinational conservation landscape.

Lobéké National Park is managed by the Government of Cameroon as part of the wider Sangha Trinational conservation landscape. The park is administered in collaboration with national and international partners, including the World Wide Fund for Nature (WWF), the Wildlife Conservation Society (WCS) and the Central African Forest Commission (COMIFAC). Management activities include wildlife monitoring, anti-poaching patrols, ecological research and programmes involving local communities.

Since 2000, the park has formed part of the Sangha Trinational, a transboundary conservation initiative linking Lobéké National Park with Dzanga-Ndoki National Park in the Central African Republic and Nouabalé-Ndoki National Park in the Republic of the Congo. In 2012, the transboundary landscape was inscribed as a UNESCO World Heritage Site in recognition of its outstanding biodiversity and the protection of one of the largest remaining blocks of Congo Basin rainforest.

Despite its protected status, Lobéké continues to face pressure from elephant poaching, illegal hunting and logging activities in surrounding areas. Outside the park boundaries, the landscape is managed as a mosaic of protected forests, logging concessions and community hunting zones. This integrated approach seeks to reconcile biodiversity conservation with the sustainable use of natural resources while maintaining ecological connectivity across the wider Sangha landscape.

== See also ==
- Wildlife of Cameroon
