= Agriculture and Rural Development Day =

Annual event

Between 2009 and 2012, Agriculture and Rural Development Day (ARDD) was an annual event co-organized by the Consultative Group on International Agricultural Research (CGIAR), the Earth System Science Partnership (ESSP), the Food and Agriculture Organization (FAO), the Global Forum on Agricultural Research (GFAR), the International Federation of Agricultural Producers (IFAP), and the International Food Policy Research Institute (IFPRI).

== History ==
The first three ARRDs were side events of the United Nations Climate Change Conference (COP15) held in 2009, 2010, and 2011 in Copenhagen, Denmark, Cancún, Mexico, and Durban, South Africa, respectively. Over 500 people attended in 2011, where British population biologist John Beddington "presented key actions for avoiding a future in which weather extremes produce a succession of food crises".

The fourth event took place at the United Nations Conference on Sustainable Development (UNCSD)—also called Rio 2012, Rio+20, or the Earth Summit 2012—in Rio de Janeiro, Brazil. It was co-hosted by the Brazilian Agricultural Research Corporation (Embrapa) and the CGIAR.

The fifth and final ARDD, called Agriculture, Landscapes, and Livelihoods Day 5 (ALL-5), took place alongside Forest Day on the sidelines of the 2012 United Nations Climate Change Conference (COP18) in Doha, Qatar.

In 2013, this event merged with Forest Day to become the Global Landscapes Forum (GLF).
