= Eric William Chomba =

Zambian footballer (born 1988)

Personal information
- Date of birth: 11 June 1988 (age 38)
- Place of birth: Lusaka, Zambia
- Position: Midfielder

Team information
- Current team: Nkwazi F.C.

Senior career*
| Years | Team | Apps | (Gls) |
| 2013–2015 | Konkola Blades F.C. | | |
| 2016– | Nkwazi F.C. | | |

International career
| 2017– | Zambia | 2 | (0) |
- * Club domestic league appearances and goals

Eric William Chomba (born 11 June 1988) is a Zambian football midfielder who currently plays for Nkwazi F.C.
