= Global Landscapes Forum =

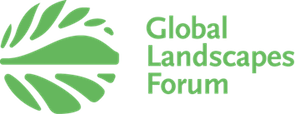
- Logo
- Abbreviation: GLF
- Formation: 5 November 2013 (12 years ago)
- Type: Non-profit organisation
- Headquarters: Bonn, Germany, Indonesia
- Location: Bonn, Germany
- Region served: Worldwide
- Director General: Robert Nasi
- Executive Producer: John Colmey
- Parent organization: Center for International Forestry Research
- Affiliations: World Bank, United Nations Environment Programme, German Federal Ministry for the Environment, Nature Conservation, Building and Nuclear Safety (BMUB), German Federal Ministry for Economic Cooperation and Development (BMZ), Food Systems, Land Use and Restoration (FOLUR)
- Website: http://www.globallandscapesforum.org/
- Formerly called: Forest Day, Agriculture and Rural Development Day

The Global Landscapes Forum (GLF) is a multi-stakeholder forum that promotes the ‘landscape approach’. to building landscapes that are productive, prosperous, equitable and resilient. It works to catalyze a movement that puts communities first in informing and addressing landscape-level issues. The GLF’s network connects more than 10,500 organizations from 185 countries.

== Overview ==
The GLF is the world’s largest knowledge-led platform on sustainable and inclusive landscapes. It works to catalyze a movement that puts communities first in informing and addressing landscape-level issues. It is led by the Center for International Forestry Research-World Agroforestry Center (CIFOR-ICRAF). As of 2022, the GLF has connected more than 60,000 youth representatives, 90 governments, 10,500 organizations and 275,000 people from 185 countries, and has had a global accumulated reach through traditional and social media of more than 2 billion people. The GLF values are to connect with the value of inclusion, share with the value of equity, learn with the value of collaboration and act with the value of innovation.

== History ==
The inaugural GLF event took place alongside the 2013 United Nations Climate Change Conference (COP 19) in Warsaw, Poland. It heralded the merger of Forest Day and Agriculture and Rural Development Day, reflecting a scientific climate which looked at breaking down research silos and utilizing an integrated landscape approach. The first four major GLF events were held annually on the sidelines of the United Nations Climate Change Conference.

Following a major funding injection from the German government, the GLF moved to establish a secretariat in Bonn, Germany. This is part of an effort by the German government and the city of Bonn to establish a "sustainability cluster" in the city.

== Partners ==
The GLF is a flagship program of CIFOR-ICRAF with its GLF Secretariat in Bonn, Germany. Current core partners are the World Bank and the United Nations Environment Programme and 35 Charter Members:

- CIAT
- CIFOR-ICRAF
- CIRAD
- Climate Focus
- Conservation International
- Crop Trust
- EcoAgriculture Partners
- European Forest Institute
- Evergreen Agriculture
- Food and Agriculture Organization
- Forest Stewardship Council
- Deutsche Gesellschaft für Internationale Zusammenarbeit
- International Centre for Integrated Mountain Development
- IFOAM - Organics International
- International Livestock Research Institute
- International Bamboo and Rattan Organisation
- IPMG
- International Union of Forest Research Organizations
- Rainforest Alliance
- RARE
- RRI
- Sustainable Agriculture Network
- Global Environment Facility
- World Bank
- TMG Thinktank
- United Nations Convention to Combat Desertification
- United Nations Environment Programme
- Wageningen University & Research
- World Farmers' Organisation
- World Resources Institute
- World Wide Fund for Nature
- Youth In Landscapes Initiative

As of 2017, the host country partners are the German Federal Ministry for the Environment, Nature Conservation, Building and Nuclear Safety (BMUKN) and Federal Ministry for Economic Cooperation and Development (BMZ).

== Initiatives ==
The GLF is a network that thrives on community support and engagement. It prioritizes the involvement of youth through the Youth In Landscapes Initiative platform. Additionally, GLFx connects local chapters worldwide to drive tangible progress towards sustainable landscapes.

=== Learning (Landscape Academy, Digital Campus) ===
The GLF learning activities directly develop the capacity of the GLF’s wide-ranging stakeholders, allowing for increased uptake and scaling of sustainable landscape approaches and accelerated action at local levels. Specifically, the GLF works with partners and stakeholders to create and hold tailored training programs and workshops, and to create and curate complementary resources such as toolkits. The center of the GLF's learning activities, the Landscape Academy, is the hub for landscape learning and training, offering online and in-person learning opportunities. The Landscape Academy is a collaboration between the GLF, Wageningen University and Research and the UN Environment Programme, as well as the GLF partners, schools and universities across the world. Its aim is to strengthen the capacities of young, current and future professionals in landscape approaches, restoration and governance. As of 2021, over 18,000 learners have enrolled in the GLF-led Sustainable and Inclusive Landscapes certificate program, including online courses on landscape leadership, landscape governance, landscape finance, climate action, and biodiverse landscapes.

=== GLFx ===
GLFx is the GLF’s program that through the establishment of local chapters supports community-led projects, helps scale up initiatives, drives local action, and enables knowledge sharing, focusing on improving landscapes from the ground up. The GLFx network connects and highlights the work of 34 chapters led by grassroots organizations at the forefront of change.

=== Youth in Landscapes ===
Ever since the GLF’s inaugural event in Warsaw, Poland, back in 2013, GLF has engaged with youth-led and youth-serving organizations. On this occasion, 10 young professionals from across the world shared their stories and highlighted the key and active role that youth have in landscapes. This initial involvement of 10 people led to the decision of hiring a youth coordinator, to the formation of the Youth in Landscapes Initiative (YIL), and, in only 7 years, to the connection and training of thousands of individuals around the world.

YIL is a partnership coordinated by the Young Professionals for Agricultural Development (YPARD), the International Forestry Students Association (IFSA), and Youth 4 Nature (Y4N). Together, these organizations represent over 60,000 young people working and studying across frontiers and generations to achieve justice and shared prosperity for communities and to support thriving landscapes.

=== Restoration Stewards ===
Launched in 2020, the Restoration Stewards program – a collaboration between the Youth in Landscapes Initiative (YIL) and the GLF – selects young restoration practitioners for a year-long program that provides funding, mentorship, and training to support their restoration work.

=== Sustainable Finance and Value Chains ===
The GLF Investment Case has become a sustainable finance forum globally, providing a convening space for a community of sustainable financial actors that review and launch strategies for land-based investments.

1,800 participants were selected to participate in person at the first four Investment Case events in London (2015, 2016), Washington D.C. (2018) and Luxembourg (2019), while thousands more tuned in virtually via live-stream. These events saw the launch of multiple major sustainable finance innovations, including the Tropical Landscapes Financing Facility (TLFF) in Indonesia and the Land Degradation Neutrality (LDN) Fund.

Building on the fruitful organization of the 4th GLF Investment Case Symposium in Luxembourg in 2019, the GLF and the Government of the Grand Duchy of Luxembourg launched a longer term partnership: The Luxembourg-GLF Finance For Nature Platform. The 2021-24 partnership will catalyze and accelerate the mainstreaming of sustainable finance and the development of innovative finance instruments that contribute to nature-based solutions to climate change mitigation and adaptation.

The GLF also focuses on sustainable value chains as a collaborator in the FOLUR Impact Program. Food Systems, Land Use and Restoration (FOLUR) is a $345 million, seven-year initiative funded by the Global Environment Facility and led by the World Bank.

Seeking to transform food and land use systems, the program consists of a global knowledge platform and 27 country projects. Country-level work will focus on accelerating action in landscapes and along value chains for eight major commodities, including livestock, cocoa, coffee, maize, palm oil, rice, soy and wheat.

== Events ==
=== Predecessor events ===
Following a move towards more integrated landscape approaches in both the forestry and agriculture sides of the research for development sphere, the Global Landscapes Forum was born in 2013 out of a merger of Forest Day and Agriculture and Rural Development Day (ARDD), which had been annual side events at the United Nations Climate Change conference (COP) since 2007 and 2009 respectively.

=== UNCCC COP side events ===
Event	Year	Location	Launches and highlights
COP19	2013	Warsaw, Poland	Official launch of the GLF.
COP20	6–7 December 2014	Lima, Peru	Launch of the Youth in Landscapes (YIL) Initiative.
COP21	2015	Paris, France	Launch of AFR100.
COP22	2016	Marrakesh, Morocco	Launch of the Global Peatlands Initiative; the German Federal Ministry for the Environment, Nature Conservation, Building and Nuclear Safety (BMUB) and Federal Ministry for Economic Cooperation and Development (BMZ) announced a major injection of core funding to support the development of the GLF for the next five years.
GLF Bonn 2017 alongside COP23	19–20 December 2017	Bonn, Germany	Launch.
GLF Katowice 2018 alongside COP24	9 December 2018	Katowice, Poland	The second climate-focused GLF event unfolded in Katowice, Poland, on 9 December alongside COP24. Government officials, international organizations and NGOs, indigenous leaders and researchers came together to connect, learn, share their work and ideas to boost climate action within landscapes. Land use, biodiversity, indigenous community rights and forest restoration were core to the livestreamed discussions on how we can move faster and better in keeping global warming below 2 °C.
GLF at COP25	11 December 2019	Madrid, Spain	The GLF live coverage during COP25.
GLF Climate 2021 Hybrid Conference: Forests, Food, Finance — Frontiers of Change alongside COP26	5–7 November 2021	Glasgow, Scotland, and online (hybrid)	Hosted alongside COP26, the hybrid conference focused on concrete action to stop the climate crisis.
GLF Climate 2022 Hybrid Conference: Frontiers of Change alongside COP27	11–12 November 2022	Sharm El Sheikh, Egypt, and online (hybrid)	GLF Climate 2022 explored ways to take control of our own fate through collective action, behavior change and the widespread adoption of nature- and land-based solutions.
GLF Nairobi 2023 Hybrid Conference: A New Vision for Earth ahead of COP28	11–12 October 2023	Nairobi, Kenya, and online (hybrid)	Hosted ahead of COP28, GLF Nairobi 2023 explored local solutions to the global climate and biodiversity crises.
GLF Climate 2025: A New Vision for Earth	17 November 2025	COP30 Blue Zone, Belem, Brazil and online (hybrid)	Held at COP30 in Belém, Brazil, and livestreamed worldwide, GLF Climate 2025 gathered the majority for action – showcasing and demanding recognition for the grassroots climate solutions being led by communities worldwide.

=== Stand-alone flagship events ===
Event	Dates	Location	Launches and highlights					
Global Landscapes Forum: Peatlands Matter	18 May 2017	Jakarta, Indonesia, and online	The thematic GLF Peatlands Matter brought together local and global actors to accelerate positive action in the management of peatlands around the world.					
GLF Bonn 2018	1–2 December 2018	Bonn, Germany	Landscape Heroes campaign and the Landscape Academy in partnership with the UN Environment Programme and the Wageningen Centre for Development Innovation (CDI).					
GLF Nairobi 2018	29–30 August 2018	Nairobi, Kenya	Brought together African officials, international and non-governmental organizations, Indigenous communities, finance and the private sector, youth and international artist Rocky Dawuni, to share challenges and successes in landscape restoration from across the African continent.					
GLF Bonn 2019	22–23 June 2019	Bonn, Germany	The new ‘gold standard’ for rights for Indigenous peoples and local communities, developed by the Indigenous People’s Major Group for Sustainable Development (IPMG), working with the Rights and Resources Initiative (RRI).					
GLF New York 2019: Restore the Earth	28 September 2019	New York, USA	Close to Climate Week, explored the potential and practical implications of ecosystem restoration, following the UN’s announcement of the 2021-2030 Decade on Ecosystem Restoration.					
GLF Accra 2019: Restoring Africa’s Landscapes – Uniting Action from Above and Below	28–29 October 2020	Accra, Ghana	Focused on accelerating landscape restoration on the African continent. It took place in conjunction with the fourth annual partnership meeting of the continent-wide restoration initiative AFR100.					
GLF Bonn 2020: Food in the Time of Crises	3–5 June 2020	Online	Given the onset of the global COVID-19 pandemic, this conference was held on entirely online, and was focused on exploring how to restore the planet’s food systems in the context of health and climate crises.					
GLF Biodiversity 2020 Digital Conference: One World – One Health	28–29 October 2020	Online	Focused on advocating for the importance of biodiversity in preventing future crises of global pandemics and climate change.					
GLF Africa 2021: Restoring Africa’s Drylands	2–3 June 2021	Online	Focused on dryland restoration, ahead of the 5 June 2021 launch of the United Nations Decade on Ecosystem Restoration.					
GLF Amazonia 2021: The Tipping Point – Solutions from the Inside Out	21–23 September 2021	Online	Centered on the message that the protection of the Amazon is crucial for the survival of people and ecosystems globally.					
GLF Africa 2022 Digital Conference	15 September 2022	Online	Explored African solutions to the global food crisis caused by climate change, COVID-19 and the Russian invasion of Ukraine.					
GLF Peatlands 2024 Hybrid Conference: The Climate Solution We Forgot	6 June 2024	Bonn, Germany and online (Hybrid)	United 1,300 participants from 118 countries, 41 speakers and more than 30 global and local partner organizations to give peatlands the attention they deserve.	–	GLF Africa 2024: Greening the African Horizon	17 September 2024	Nairobi, Kenya and online (Hybrid)	Gathered 3,555 participants from 119 countries to forge a prosperous and sustainable future for Africa’s land- and seascapes, powered by local solutions.

|}

=== GLF Investment Case Symposia ===
The GLF Investment Case Symposia are global sustainable finance forums that connect investors with local actors and highlight ways to catalyze private investment in community projects. The events also provide a regular convening space for a community of leading sustainable financial actors to review and launch new innovative strategies for land-based investments.

Events	Dates	Location	Overview
Global Landscapes Forum: The Investment Case	10–11 June 2015	London, United Kingdom	The first Investment Case event was an invitation-only symposium with 220 attendees from the finance sector, which was coordinated by the European Investment Bank, UN Environment, the World Bank, and the Program on Forests (PROFOR).
Global Landscapes Forum: The Investment Case	6 June 2016	London, United Kingdom	The second edition of the GLF Investment Case offered a unique platform for 300 senior representatives from the financial sector, civil society, government and business to explore the role of private finance in enhancing livelihoods and landscapes across the globe.
GLF Investment Case Symposium Washington, D.C.	30 May 2018	Washington DC, USA	The third edition of the GLF Investment Case Symposium gathered finance stakeholders in Washington, D.C., to share expertise and opportunities for investment in more sustainable land use.
4th GLF Investment Case Symposium GLF Luxembourg 2019	30 November 2019	Luxembourg	The 4th GLF Investment Case Symposium, GLF Luxembourg 2019, explored the question of how to move sustainable land-use financing into the mainstream. The event followed the UN Environment Program Finance Initiative (UNEP FI) Regional Roundtable in Luxembourg.
5th GLF Investment Case Symposium at GLF Climate 2021	7 November 2021	Glasgow, Scotland, and online (hybrid)	The 5th GLF Investment Case Symposium took place on the third day of the GLF Climate 2021 Hybrid Conference. As part of the Luxembourg–GLF Finance for Nature Platform, the symposium aimed to promote nature-based solutions and sustainable land-use approaches in green finance practices, while exploring opportunities to expand investments in these spheres.
6th GLF Investment Case Symposium GLF–Luxembourg Finance for Nature: What comes next?	7 March 2023	Luxembourg and online (hybrid)	The event featured the state of sustainable finance in 2023, including the latest innovations, success stories, investable projects and much more.
7th GLF Investment Case Symposium – Rewarding Nature: A Roadmap to Finance the Biodiversity Plan	25 October 2024	Cali, Colombia and online (hybrid)	Held alongside the 2024 UN Biodiversity Conference (COP16), the global event explored how to fund efforts to stem and reverse biodiversity loss by 2030.
8th GLF Investment Case Symposium: Financing Nature’s Frontlines	18 November 2025	COP30 Blue Zone, Belem, Brazil and online (hybrid)	Held at COP30 in Belém, Brazil, and livestreamed worldwide, the event challenged governments and investors to rethink the future of climate and nature finance.

=== Co-organized events ===
The GLF partners with an array of leading environmental organizations to create meaningful online and in-person events.

Event	Dates	Location	Partners
Policy Dialogue Workshop: Laws and Best Practices for Reducing Fire and Haze	30 August 2017	Riau, Indonesia	GLF CIFOR
Digital Forum: Food without Farmers	23 April 2020	Online	IFOAM – Organics International GLF
Digital Forum: Can tree planting save our planet?	29 September 2020	Online	CIFOR-ICRAF Resilient Landscapes GLF
Global Disruptive Tech Challenge 2021: Restoring Landscapes in the Aral Sea Region	5–9 April 2021	Online	Central Asia Water and Energy Program (CAWEP) World Bank, RESILAND CA + Kazakh-German University (DKU) GLF Plug and Play
Digital Forum: Nature-Based Solutions	29 April 2021	Online	Collaborative Partnership on Forests (CPF) Global Partnership on Forest and Landscape Restoration (GPFLR) GLF
Digital Forum: Food. Nature. People.	2 September 2021	Online	CIFOR-ICRAF GLF CGIAR Research Program on Forests Trees and Agroforestry
Sustainable Finance For Nature-Based Solutions	30 March 2022	Online	Luxembourg-GLF Finance for Nature Platform
Media Seminar: Building a Green, Healthy and Resilient Future with Forests	28–29 April 2022	Online and Seoul, Republic of Korea	Food and Agriculture Organization (FAO) GLF
GLF at UNCCD COP15	9–20 May 2022	Abidjan, Côte d’Ivoire, and online (hybrid)	GLF TMG Research
Digital Forum: Transforming Food Systems from the Bottom Up	15 July 2022	Online	TMG Research Deutsche Gesellschaft für Internationale Zusammenarbeit (GIZ) GmbH LRIDA GRAF GLF BMZ
Digital Forum: Transforming Agrifood Systems with Forests	29 September 2022	Online	Food and Agriculture Organization (FAO) GLF UN-REDD program
GLF Climate 2022 Media Seminar: Working away at climate change	2–3 November 2022	Online	GLF Pulitzer Center
Biodiversity Finance Digital Forum: Investing in People and Nature	29 November 2022	Online	Luxembourg-GLF Finance for Nature Platform
Finance for Nature Digital Forum: Investing in Equitable Futures	13 July 2023	Online	GLF BMUV Luxembourg-GLF Finance for Nature Platform

== See also ==
- United Nations Climate Change Conference
