= Ecosystem Marketplace =

American non-profit organization

- Founded: 2004
- Location: United States District of Columbia, DC
- Fields: Environmentalism
- Website: www.ecosystemmarketplace.com

Ecosystem Marketplace, an initiative of Forest Trends, is a non-profit organization based in Washington, DC, that focuses on increasing transparency and providing information for ecosystem services and payment schemes.

The idea of launching Ecosystem Marketplace was borne out of meeting by members of The Katoomba Group, an international working group composed of leading experts from forest and energy industries, research institutions, the financial world, and environmental NGOs dedicated to advancing markets for some of the ecosystem services provided by forests – such as watershed protection, biodiversity habitat, and carbon capture and storage. Both Ecosystem Marketplace and The Katoomba Group are initiatives under Forest Trends. Ecosystem Marketplace specializes in market-based approaches to environmental protection—in the public and private spheres—regarding greenhouse gases, water, biodiversity, and conservation. This is why it is perceived as an organisation that pushes for neoliberal biodiversity conservation.

Ecosystem Marketplace's website states: "We believe that by providing solid and trust-worthy information on prices, regulation, science, and other market-relevant issues, markets for ecosystem services will one day become a fundamental part of our economic and environmental system, helping give value to environmental services that have, for too long, been taken for granted."

== Market coverage ==
Ecosystem Marketplace has covered information on a number of areas, including the following:

Carbon

Relevant material can be accessed via the main Ecosystem Marketplace website, the carbon markets landing page, and the Forest Carbon Portal.

- Kyoto-related carbon markets (EU ETS, CDM, JI)
- Voluntary over-the-counter markets
- North American state and regional markets
- Payments for terrestrial carbon sequestration

Water

Relevant material can be accessed via the main Ecosystem Marketplace website and Watershed Connect.

- Water quality and nutrient trading
- Schemes to pay for watershed services
- Nitrogen offset programs

Biodiversity

Relevant material can be accessed via the main Ecosystem Marketplace website and the Species Banking Portal.

- Conservation banking in the U.S.
- Wetland/stream mitigation banking in the U.S.
- Australian biodiversity offset programs
- Voluntary biodiversity offsets

Communities

Relevant material can be accessed via the main Ecosystem Marketplace website and the Communities Portal.

- PES program design
- community ecosystem management
- community buyer relations
- poverty equity
- community as buyer
- payments compensation
- land tenure rights

== State Of Reports ==
=== Biodiversity ===
- Madsen, Becca, Nathaniel Carroll, and Kelly Moore Brands. 2010 State of Biodiversity Markets. Ecosystem Marketplace, 2010.
- Madsen, Becca, Nathaniel Carroll, Daniel Kandy, and Genevieve Bennett. 2011 State of Biodiversity Markets. Ecosystem Marketplace, 2011.

=== Forest carbon ===
- Hamilton, Katherine, Unna Chokkalingam, and Maria Bendana. State of the Forest Carbon Markets 2009. Ecosystem Marketplace, 2010.
- Diaz, David, Katherine Hamilton, and Evan Johnson. State of Forest Carbon Markets 2011. Ecosystem Marketplace, 2011.
- Peters-Stanley, Molly, Katherine Hamilton, and Daphne Yin. State of Forest Carbon Markets 2012 Ecosystem Marketplace, 2012.

=== Voluntary carbon ===
- Hamilton, Katherine, Ricardo Bayon, Guy Turner, and Douglas Higgins. State of the Voluntary Carbon Markets 2007: Picking Up Steam. Ecosystem Marketplace and Bloomberg New Carbon Finance, 2007.
- Hamilton, Katherine, Milo Sjardin, Thomas Marcello, and Gordon Xu. State of the Voluntary Carbon Markets 2008: Forging a Frontier. Ecosystem Marketplace and Bloomberg New Carbon Finance, 2008.
- Hamilton, Katherine, Milo Sjardin, Allison Shapiro, and Thomas Marcello. State of the Voluntary Carbon Markets 2009: Fortifying the Foundation. Ecosystem Marketplace and Bloomberg New Carbon Finance, 2009.
- Hamilton, Katherine, Molly Peters-Stanley, and Thomas Marcello. State of the Voluntary Carbon Markets 2010: Building Bridges. Ecosystem Marketplace and Bloomberg New Energy Finance, 2010.
- Peters-Stanley, Molly, Katherine Hamilton, Thomas Marcello, and Milo Sjardin. State of the Voluntary Carbon Markets 2011: Back to the Future. Ecosystem Marketplace and Bloomberg New Energy Finance, 2011.
- Peters-Stanley, Molly and Katherine Hamilton. State of the Voluntary Carbon Markets 2012: Developing Dimension. Ecosystem Marketplace and Bloomberg New Energy Finance, 2012.

=== Water ===
- Stanton, Tracy, Marta Echavarria, Katherine Hamilton, and Caroline Ott. State of Watershed Payments: An Emerging Marketplace. Ecosystem Marketplace, 2010.

== Other publications ==
General

- EM Market Insights. Beyond Carbon: Biodiversity and Water Markets. Ecosystem Marketplace, 2009.
- EM Market Insights. Beyond Carbon: Integrated Solutions - Water, Biodiversity, and the Clean Development Mechanism. Ecosystem Marketplace, 2009.
- Carroll, Nathaniel and Michael Jenkins. "The Matrix: Mapping Ecosystem Service Markets" (Table), 2012.

Forest Carbon

- EM Market Insights. Forests: Taking Root in the Voluntary Carbon Markets, Second Edition . Ecosystem Marketplace, 2009.
- Asare, Rebecca. "Implications of the Legal and Policy Framework for Tree and Forest Carbon in Ghana: REDD Opportunities Scoping Exercise." Ecosystem Marketplace, 2010.
- Richards, Michael. "The REDD Opportunities Scoping Exercise for Ghana." Ecosystem Marketplace, 2010.

Voluntary Carbon

- Bayon, Ricardo, Amanda Hawn, and Katherine Hamilton. Voluntary Carbon Markets. Ecosystem Marketplace, 2007.
- Peters-Stanley, Molly. Bringing It Home: Governments Worldwide Embrace Voluntary Carbon Offset Market. Ecosystem Marketplace, 2012.

== See also ==
- Biodiversity banking
- Carbon offset
- Carbon trading
- Emissions trading
- Payment for ecosystem services
- Water trading
