= Forest Trends =

American non-profit organization

- Industry: Conservation
- Founded: 1998; 28 years ago
- Headquarters: 1203 19th Street, NW, 4th Floor, DC 20036, USA
- Revenue: 5,285,550 United States dollar (2016)
- Total assets: 10,282,490 United States dollar (2022)
- Website: www.forest-trends.org

Forest Trends is a non-profit organization founded in 1998 and based in Washington, DC, that connects with economic tools and incentives for maintaining ecosystems. Its mission is four-fold: to expand the value of forests to society, to promote sustainable forest management and conservation by creating and capturing market values for ecosystem services, to support innovative projects and companies that are developing these markets and to enhance the livelihoods of local communities living in and around those forests.

== History ==
Beginning in 1996, a small group of leaders from forest industry, donors, and environmental groups began to meet to consider the array of challenges facing forest conservation and began to identify common ground. This group recognized the respective contributions and limits of their own institutions and decided to create a new organization - Forest Trends - to expand this work of bridging traditional divides and promoting market-based approaches to forest conservation.

In 1998, the group agreed on an organizational model for the new organization. Forest Trends would be a small, nimble, and responsive non-profit organization with three principal roles: convening market players to advance market transformations, generating and disseminating critical information to market players, and facilitating deals between different critical links in the value chains of new forestry. The original group of participants was expanded to include additional representatives from industry, finance, and community conservation, and this enlarged group became the original Board of Directors. The Board was expanded in late 1999 to include representation from other major forest areas besides the United States, including Russia, Brazil, Malaysia, and Canada.

== Approach ==
Forest Trends states it connects producers, suppliers, governments, communities, NGOs, and investors. It uses its information and networks to address key systems barriers to the development of new business and policy models on issues such as "climate-friendly" forestry and agriculture, watershed services and water quality, no-net-loss biodiversity, coastal and marine ecosystem services, supply chain traceability and transparency, "innovative finance" and "community stewardship" and inclusion.

== Initiatives ==
=== Business and Biodiversity Offsets Program ===
BBOP is an international partnership of some 40 leading conservation organizations, companies, governments, and financial institutions developing, testing and implementing best practices on biodiversity offsets. Forest Trends launched BBOP in November 2004, and serves as its Secretariat with the Wildlife Conservation Society.

Together, the BBOP partners are designing and implementing biodiversity offsets in a range of industry sectors, countries and ecosystems, and sharing the results and practical guidance in the form of a number of publications. These include a set of principles, offset design and implementation handbooks, and case studies. BBOP also supports governments developing policy related to biodiversity offsets, conservation banking and land-use and landscape level planning. The BBOP closed in December 2018.

=== The Katoomba Group ===
The Katoomba Group is an international network of individuals working to promote and improve capacity related to markets and payment for ecosystem services (PES). With its first gathering in 2000, the Katoomba Group was launched as an international working group focused on advancing markets for the ecosystem services—including watershed protection, biodiversity habitat, and carbon storage. The Group serves as a source of ideas for and strategic information about ecosystem service markets. Its international meetings have provided a forum for influencing policy-makers, and catalyzing new initiatives. The Group has advised national policy discussions on financial incentives for conservation in numerous countries including China, Brazil, India, and Colombia. Currently it has held 14 major global conferences, published and contributed to numerous publications, and supported the development of a range of new PES schemes including the BioCarbon Fund at the World Bank and the Mexican PES Fund. Since 2006, regional Katoomba networks have formed and to date, regional networks exist in tropical America, Eastern and Southern Africa, and West Africa.

=== Communities & Markets ===
The Communities & Markets program seeks to reduce poverty, improve livelihoods and conserve natural resources by promoting community participation in market-based conservation mechanisms. The program links communities to environmental markets by promoting the awareness and capacity for communities to participate in and benefit from payments and compensation schemes that value their stewardship role of ecosystem services. Working with other Forest Trends programs and partner organizations, it provides information, capacity building, and technical assistance for communities around the world.

=== Ecosystem Marketplace ===
Ecosystem Marketplace is a global platform for transparent information on ecosystem value and transactions. The website features news, data and analyses on markets and payments for ecosystem services such as water quality, carbon sequestration and biodiversity.

=== Forest Trade & Finance ===
Since 2000, Forest Trends has been engaged with the Chinese Government and research agencies to encourage sustainable forest management and forest trade policies, launching a global forest finance initiative with the goal of raising transparency and accountability, and ultimately for improving practices by financial institutions that fund forestry investment.

=== Marine Ecosystem Services Program ===
The Marine Ecosystem Services Program aims to protect marine ecosystem services by harnessing markets and private sector investment, in order to complement conventional coastal and marine management and safeguard human well-being. The Initiative is a new focus for Forest Trends, building on the core work done by the organization in terrestrial ecosystems and conventional markets. It works with other Forest Trends programs, the Katoomba Group and Ecosystem Marketplace to adapt their models in developing the conceptual underpinnings for marine PES markets and biodiversity offsets.

== Organization ==
The group identifies as a 501(c)(3) organization per its last tax return from 2013 posted on its website. As of February 2015 the organization listed 50 staff members including its President and CEO, and listed the Board of Directors with the following 18 members after Matthew Arnold from JPMorgan Chase & Co. departed:

- John Begley – Harbor Paper, Seattle, Washington
- Mark Bierbower – Hunton and Williams LLP, Washington, DC
- David Brand – New Forests Pty Limited, Sydney, Australia
- Richard Burrett – Earth Capital Partners, London, UK
- Linda Coady – Enbridge, formerly with Liu Institute for Global Issues, Vancouver, BC, Canada
- Sally Collins – Sally Collins LLC, Boulder, Colorado
- John Earhart – Global Environment Fund, Buenos Aires, Argentina
- Randy Hayes – Rainforest Action Network, San Francisco, California
- Prof. Hans Hoogeveen, JD, MPA – Ministry of Economic Affairs, Agriculture and Innovation, The Hague, The Netherlands
- Michael Jenkins – Forest Trends, Washington, DC
- Olof Johansson – Sveaskog, Stockholm, Sweden
- Miguel Milano – Instituo LIFE (Lasting Initiative For Earth), Curitiba, Brazil
- Daniel Nepstad – EII, Earth Innovation Institute, San Francisco, California
- Yusuf Ole Petenya – Shompole Community Trust, Nairobi, Kenya
- Martha Isabel Ruiz Corzo – Sierra Gorda Biosphere Reserve, Mexico
- Sergey Tsyplenkov – Greenpeace, Russia, Moscow, Russia
- Bettina von Hagen – Ecotrust, Portland, Oregon

== Criticism ==
Forest Trends has been named a non ordinary NGO by forest activist Chris Lang, who claims that the organisation is more interested in creating investment opportunities and is pushing for the commodification of nature. Further some active employees have tight connection to the World Bank like Michael Jenkins and Ken Newcombe. Further David Brand is head of New Forests which has a poor environmental and social record in forestry projects in Uganda. Therefore, many of its members have conflicts of interests. Further Lang criticises the Carbon Market report from 2017 "Unlocking Potential", because it fails to mention fossil fuels and claims that carbon markets would combat climate change.
