= World Agroforestry Centre =

International organization

World Agroforestry
- Abbreviation: ICRAF
- Formation: 1978
- Type: INGO
- Headquarters: Nairobi, Kenya
- Region served: Worldwide
- Official language: English
- Director General: Éliane Ubalijoro
- Website: www.worldagroforestry.org

World Agroforestry (a brand name used by the International Centre for Research in Agroforestry, ICRAF) is an international institute headquartered in Nairobi, Kenya, and founded in 1978 as "International Council for Research in Agroforestry". The centre specializes in the sustainable management, protection and regulation of tropical rainforest and natural reserves. It is one of 15 agricultural research centres which makes up the global network known as the CGIAR.

== Description ==
The centre conducts research in agroforestry, in partnership with national agricultural research systems with a view to developing more sustainable and productive land use. The focus of its research is countries/regions in the developing world, particular in the tropics of Central and South America, Southeast Asia, South Asia, West Africa, Eastern Africa and parts of central Africa. In 2002, the centre acquired the World Agroforestry Centre brand name, although International Centre for Research in Agroforestry remains its legal name and it continues to use the acronym ICRAF.

In 2017, ICRAF released a study at the UN Climate Change Conference that centers on agroforestry and the emission of carbons from deforestation.

== See also ==
- Forest Day
- Aster Gebrekirstos
