= Timeline of the Central African Republic Civil War =

The following is a timeline of events during the Central African Republic Civil War.

== 2012 ==
Séléka advances in C.A.R. (December 2012–March 2013)

=== December ===
- 10 December: Rebels took control of cities of N'Délé, Sam Ouandja and Ouadda
- 15 December: Rebels took control of Bamingui
- 18 December: Rebels took control of Bria
- 19 December: Rebels took control of Kabo
- 22 December: Rebels took control of Ippy and Ndassima
- 24 December: Rebels took control of Bambari
- 25 December: Rebels took control of Kaga-Bandoro
- 28 December:
  - Government counteroffensive on Bambari repelled
  - Rebels took control of Dekoa.
- 29 December: Rebels took control of Sibut

== 2013 ==
=== January ===
- 5 January: Rebels took control of Alindao
- 11 January: Peace agreement signed
- 20–21 January: Rebels took control of Dimbi and Kembé.
- 30 January: Rebels took control of Kouango

=== February ===
- 8 February: Rebels took control of Mobaye.

=== March ===
- 1 March: Rebels took control of Moyenne-Sido
- 12 March: Rebels took control of Rafai
- 18 March: Rebels took control of Gambo and Bangassou
- 21 March: Rebels took control of Damara, Bouca and Bossangoa
- 23 March:
  - Rebels took control of power plant in Boali and shut off power to the city.
  - Rebels entered Bangui
  - Rebels took control of Bossembélé
- 24 March: Rebels reached the presidential palace in the centre of the capital.
- 25 March: Séléka leader Michel Djotodia, who served after the January agreement as First Deputy Prime Minister for National Defense, declared himself President, becoming the first Muslim to hold the office. Djotodia said that there would be a three-year transitional period and that Nicolas Tiangaye would continue to serve as Prime Minister.
- 28 March: Séléka forces moved to western part of CAR, capturing Paoua, Bouar and Nola

=== April ===
- 2 April: FDPC withdrew from Séléka coalition. In response, Séléka launched heavy attack on FDPC positions near Baboua, killing some fighters.

=== August ===
- 30 August: LRA established their base in Fodé in Mbomou.

=== September ===
- 1 September: Anti-Balaka was formed
- 6 September: Anti-balaka attacked Zéré on the road between Bouca and Bossangoa, killing at least 55 civilians.
- 9 September: Anti-balaka attacked Seleka in Bouca.
- 13 September: Djotodia formally disbanded Séléka.
- 17 September: Anti-balaka attacked Bossangoa.
- Revolution and Justice (RJ) was formed in Ouham-Pendé prefecture

=== October ===
- 10 October: 30 Seleka fighters who were occupying Bangassou were arrested by authorities.
- 13 October: Anti-balaka took control of Gaga after six days of battle with Seleka.
- 26 October: anti-Balaka attacked Séléka in Bouar (fr)

=== November ===
- 1 November: RJ established training camp in Boloum near Paoua.
- 10 November: Séléka attacked Anti-balaka in Camp Bangui town north of Yaloke burning many homes.

=== December ===
- 5 December:
  - French forces started operation Sangaris
  - Anti-balaka attacked Bangui. Fleeing residents create IDP camp at M'Poko airport.
- 12 December: anti-Balaka killed 27 civilians in Bohong (fr)
- 24 December: RJ attacked Beboura killing 45 Seleka fighters.

== 2014 ==
=== January ===
- 8 January: Séléka withdrew from Boyali. Same day anti-Balaka attack killed local Muslims leading to return of Séléka forces which committed another massacre
- 10 January: Michel Djotodia resigned. Alexandre-Ferdinand Nguendet became transitional president.
- 13 January: Séléka withdrew from Bozoum
- 16 January: Anti-balaka entered Bossembélé killing 43 people
- 17 January:
  - Séléka withdrew from Bossemptélé
  - Séléka withdrew from Boali. 300 anti-Balaka fighters entered town killing four civilians
- 18 January: anti-Balaka attacked Bossemptélé killing 100 people (fr)
- 20 January: Séléka withdrew from Baoro. Two days later clashes erupted between anti-Balaka and local Muslim population resulting in 100 deaths (fr)
- 22 January: Heavy clashes erupted in Boguila between RJ and Seleka leading to 22 Seleka fighters being killed.
- 24 January:
  - Joseph Kalite, former minister, was murdered by Anti-balaka outside Bangui
  - RJ took control of Bojomo on Boguila-Markounda axis after killing 13 Seleka fighters.
- 27 January: Séléka leaders left Bangui under the escort of Chadian peacekeepers.
- 28 January: Séléka withdrew from Kasai military camp in Bangui. Remaining fighters were surrounded in Beal, RDOT and BSS camps in First District.
- 29 January: Séléka withdrew from Boda leaving town largely under Anti-Balaka control
- 30 January: Séléka withdrew from Berberati
- FPR took control of Bang, town on border with Chad and Cameroon
- Anti-Balaka took control of Beloko border crossing with Cameroon
- RJ took control of Paoua.

=== February ===
Map of situation in C.A.R. in 2014

- 1 February: Séléka withdrew from Carnot leaving city under anti-Balaka control
- 2 February: Séléka withdrew from Sibut
- 12 February: Anti-balaka captured Nola
- 26 February: French forces arrived in Beloko border crossing forcing anti-Balaka to move to illegal crossing south of town
- RJ took control of Bang after clashes with FPR
- Central African Republic was de facto divided with Séléka controlling northern parts of country and Anti-balaka controlling southern and western parts. Government control was limited to capital city, Bangui.

=== March ===
- 10 March: Anti-balaka captured Bayanga sub-prefecture
- 18 March: MISCA dismantled Anti-balaka checkpoints between Nola and Berbérati recovering six shotguns
- 29 March: RJ captured Bedaka north of Paoua after clashes with Séléka forces

=== April ===
- 10 April: United Nations Multidimensional Integrated Stabilization Mission in the Central African Republic (MINUSCA) was formed
- 13 April:
  - Heavy clashes between anti-Balaka and Séléka erupted in Grimari (fr)
  - Last Chad forces left Central African Republic after accusations of supporting Séléka
- 22 April: ex-Séléka captured Bouca
- 30 April: European Union Military Operation in the Central African Republic took control of Bangui M'Poko International Airport

=== May ===
- 1 May: Seleka recaptured Markounda from RJ.
- 5 May: French forces repel Seleka attack on Boguila (fr)
- 28 May: ex-Séléka fighters threw grenades and discharged firearms at Church of Fatima in Bangui killing at least 11 people
- Late May: FACA recaptured Bayanga subprefecture from Anti-balaka
- IDP camp at Bangui airport houses 60,000 people

=== June ===
- 10 June: Popular Front for the Rebirth of Central African Republic (FPRC) was formed in Birao
- 23 June: Rebels captured Birao Airport
- 24 June: 100 Anti-balaka fighters attacked Bambari. 46 people were killed and 28 wounded.
- 26 June: FACA and international forces left Birao after FPRC ultimatum

=== July ===
- 1 July: RJ left Bang after MISCA ultimatum
- 23 July: Ceasefire between Anti-balaka and ex-Seleka is signed in Brazzaville
- 30 July: heavy clashes erupted between Anti-balaka and ex-Seleka in Batangafo resulting in 20,000 people being displaces.

=== August ===
- 4 August: Heavy clashes erupted in Batangafo between Seleka and French convoy (fr)
- 9 August: French forces withdrew from Batangafo leaving city to Seleka fighters

=== September ===
- 17 September: Ali Darassa formed Union for Peace in the Central African Republic (UPC)

=== November ===
- RPRC split from FPRC.

=== December ===
- 1 December: FPRC entered Kaga-Bandoro.
- 8 December: Abdel Kader Baba-Laddé, leader of FPR rebel group was arrested near Kabo

== 2015 ==
=== May ===
- 15 May: Peace agreement was signed by 9 of 10 armed groups as a result of Bangui National Forum

=== July ===
- Mahamat Al-Khatim formed Central African Patriotic Movement (MPC)

=== September ===
- 28 September: Anti-balakas stormed Ngaragba jail in Bangui freeing hundreds of inmates

=== December ===
- Return, Reclamation, Rehabilitation (3R) militia was formed in Koui
- 5 December: FACA took control of Boali from Anti-balaka
- 14 December: Independence of Republic of Logone was announced in Kaga-Bandoro
- 30 December: First round of general elections was held

== 2016 ==
=== February ===
- 14 February: Second round of presidential elections was held

=== March ===
- 18 March: Berberati was declared to be free from rebel groups.
- 30 March: Faustin-Archange Touadéra was sworn as a president

=== May ===
- 20 May: FDPC occupied Zoukombo village near Cameroonian border seizing local school.

=== June ===
- 8 June: Four rebel groups, including FPRC, UPC, MPC and anti-Balaka signed peace agreement in Mbres

=== September ===
- 27 September:
  - 3R captured De Gaulle town (now Koui) killing at least 17 civilians.
  - Boda, Carnot and Nola were declared to be free from rebel groups.

=== October ===
- 30 October: France ended operation Sangaris

=== November ===
- 30 November: FPRC captured Bakala after battle with UPC

=== December ===
- 11 December: UPC recaptured Bakala after battle with FPRC

== 2017 ==
=== January ===
- 11 January: FPRC again captured Bakala

=== February ===
- 22 February: Ali Darassa and most rebels from Union for Peace in the Central African Republic withdrew from Bambari. Anti-balaka leader followed shortly after.

=== March ===
- 20–24 March: FPRC and Anti-balaka took control of Bakouma and Nzacko after expelling UPC fighters.

=== April ===
- 19 April: Uganda announced that it would begin withdrawing forces from the Central African Republic where it has been trying to hunt down Joseph Kony in the country for 9 years.

=== May ===
Map of situation in C.A.R. in May 2017

- 2 May: 3R seized control of Niem in Koui sub-prefecture
- 9 May: UPC repelled Anti-Balaka attack on Alindao
- 13 May: Anti-Balaka forces attacked Bangassou killing more than 30 people and displacing thousands
- 14 May: 3R withdraws from Niem
- 15 May: MINUSCA retook most of Bangassou freeing hostages
- 18 May: Heavy clashes erupted between Anti-balaka and ex-Seleka in Bria resulting in 26 deaths.

=== June ===
- 6 June: FPRC attacked anti-Balaka positions in Nzako. 18 civilians were killed
- 11 June: FPRC captured Nzacko from Anti-balaka
- 28 June: Ugandan forces withdrew from Zemio. Armed Muslims entered town killing at least 28 civilians

=== September ===
- 18 September: FACA was deployed in Anti-balaka-held Bouar
- 23 September: 3R captured Bocaranga from Anti-balaka

=== December ===
- New rebel groups, Siriri, emerged in western part of Mambéré-Kadéï prefecture.

== 2018 ==
=== January ===
- 12 January: MINUSCA launched operation Mbaranga securing Paoua city and forcing armed groups to move 50 km from city
- 20 January: Heavy clashes broke out between RJ and MNLC north of Paoua forcing 60,000 people to seek refugee in city
- 25 January: FACA was deployed in Paoua
- 30 January: Revolution and Justice voluntarily dissolved itself

=== March ===
- 3 March: UPC captured Rafai subprefecture
- 6 March: Anti-balaka recaptured Rafai

=== April ===
- 7–8 April: MINUSCA and FACA launched operation to disarm PK5 self-defense groups. One peacekeeper was killed and security forces were forced to withdraw from the area.

=== May ===
- 8–9 May: FACA was deployed in Sibut with the help of Russian instructors
- MNLC merged with MPC

=== June ===
Situation in PK5 district in Bangui in July 2018

- 21 June: FACA was deployed in Bangassou. Their convoy was attacked by UPC in Bambari leading to three people being wounded before reaching the destination.

=== August ===
- 17 August: FACA took control of Dekoa
- 28 August: Four main rebel groups, including anti-Balaka, FPRC, UPC and MPC signed peace agreement in Khartoum (fr)

=== October ===
- 31 October: Heavy clashes broke out between anti-Balaka and ex-Séléka fighters in Batangafo resulting in at least 15 deaths

=== November ===
- 15 November: At least 112 people were killed and 27 injured in UPC and Anti-balaka attacks on Alindao refugee camp.

=== December ===
- 5 December: Siriri merged with 3R.
- 31 December: FPRC and UPC rebels took control of Bakouma

== 2019 ==
=== January ===
- 7 January: FACA took control of Bocaranga from 3R forces without a fight
- 10 January: UPC launched heavy attack on MINUSCA forces in Bambari
- 12–3 January: Portuguese paratroopers raided UPC base in Bokolobo, seizing number of weapons and destroying some checkpoints
- 17 January:
  - UPC attack on Bambari was repelled
  - FACA with support of MINUSCA regained control of Bakouma
- 29 January: 18 people were killed and 23 wounded when UPC fighters opened fire during funeral ceremony in Ippy

=== February ===
- 6 February: Fourteen armed groups signed Khartoum Agreement
- 25 February: Firmin Ngrébada was appointed as a prime minister as a result of peace agreement

=== April ===
- 5 April: MINUSCA captured Zoukombo killing three FDPC fighters
- 15 April: Ali Darassa, UPC leader, returned to Bambari following peace agreement

=== May ===
- 13–19 May: 3R captured areas in northwest part of Ouham-Pendé Prefecture on border with Cameroon
- 21 May: 3R fighters killed 46 civilians in Ouham-Pendé prefecture

=== September ===
- 2 September: MLCJ took control of Birao
- 27 September: Three people were killed when combat helicopter used by MINUSCA forces crashed in Bouar

=== October ===
- 4 October: FPRC repelled MLCJ attack on Tissi
- 14 October: MLCJ took control of Am Dafok
- UPC entered Bambouti

=== November ===
- 19 November: FACA took control of Camp Beal in Bangui killing 10 ex-Seleka fighters

=== December ===
- 16 December: FPRC recaptured Am Dafok
- 26 December: Security forces regained control over PK5 neighborhood in Bangui after local merchants killer 30 members of self-defense groups who ruled the area.

== 2020 ==
=== January ===
- 10 January:
  - Former president Djotodia returned to country after six years
  - UPC took control of several villages (Kollo, Kaboul 3, Zounguinza i Drochengba and Morouba) near Mingala.
- 25–26 January: MLCJ attacked Bria, capturing more than 60% of the city after 24 hours of clashes with the FPRC.

=== February ===
- 1 February: Central African military forces (FACA) were deployed in UPC-held Alindao
- 5 February: UPC allegedly withdrew from Bambouti
- 17 February: FPRC attack on MINUSCA forces in Birao is repelled, leading to 12 FPRC forces being killed.

=== March ===
- 4 March: Heavy clashes erupted in N'Délé between FPRC and RPRC
- 15 March: Clashes erupted between Anti-balaka and MINUSCA in Grimari

=== April ===
- 9 April: MINUSCA forces withdrew from Beboura in Ouham Pende after a crowd destroyed their base following a road accident.

=== May ===
- 1 May: 3R took control of Baboua. Despite partial disarmament group remains in control of big parts of Nana-Mambéré prefecture.
- 5 May: 3R withdrew from Baboua to their base near Beloko
- 9 May: FACA repelled UPC attack on Obo killing 11 militants
- 13 May: 3R leader, Sidiki Abass, escaped from Bouar. His fighters disarmed local gendarmerie seizing Besson and Koundé
- 18 May: FACA repelled another UPC attack on Obo
- 20 May: FACA with support of MINUSCA repelled another UPC attack on Obo killing 12 militants
- 27 May: 3R took control of Koundjili in Ouham-Pende. Local population fled to bush.

=== June ===
- 8 June: Prefect of Nana-Grébizi prefecture fled his residence in Kaga-Bandoro after demonstrators accused him of collaborating with MPC rebels in city. They ransacked his residence.
- 9 June: 3R attacked USMS base in Wantiguira, located 8 km from Bouar with heavy weapons.
- 20 June: Anti-balaka in Bozoum held a meeting demanding resignation of Ouham-Pende prefect accusing him of collaborating with 3R rebels.
- 25 June: MPC took control of Boguila, Nana-Bakassa and Beboura following MINUSCA withdrawal
- 30 June: Bangladeshi paratroopers from MINUSCA attacked 3R in Koui.

=== July ===
- 9 July: Demonstrators burned down police headquarters in Bagandou after police killed ex-Anti-balaka commander.
- 11 July: Police forces from Bangui were sent to Bagandou to restore peace, however they were stopped by a crowd.
- 13 July: A UN peacekeeper was killed and two others wounded in an ambush set up by the 3R militia.
- 19 July: 3R forces attacked Ngbama village near Bocaranga kidnapping 40 people and stealing 50 million CFA francs.
- 22 July: MINUSCA forces recaptured Niem from 3R forces.
- 23 July: 3R forces captured Bang village near Ngaoundaye
- 28 July: MINUSCA forces recaptured Besson from 3R forces.
- 31 July: Janjaweed militias attacked village near Am Dafock killing more than 140 people and displacing thousands.

=== August ===
- 3 August: Anti-balaka attacked Grimari blocking roads to Sibut and Bambari. FACA managed to recapture city the same day killing one Anti-balaka commander.
- 17 August: FACA captured Koui after battle with 3R.
- 30 August: Local militias took control of Gaga town near Yaloké after clashes with FACA soldiers. They ransacked buildings of Chinese companies operating in the area.

=== September ===
- 2 September: FACA recaptured Gaga
- 8 September: Three armed Anti-balaka fighters from Gaga raided home of brigade commander of Yaloké's gendarmerie and forced him to free one of their fighters who was arrested for looting. Local population organizer a protest against his decision.
- 14 September: 3R briefly captured Bohong and Mbotoga before withdrawing later that day. Local population fled to bush.
- 17 September: 3R captured four villages (Yambassa, Bavara, Bondja and Bimbi) near Paoua. They withdrew day later, but returned on 19 September.
- 22 September: MINUSCA and FACA forces were sent to recapture Bavara from 3R but were forced to withdraw after their vehicles were unable to cross a bridge.
- 27 September: 3R took control of Nanga-Boguila.
- 28 September:
  - LRA kidnapped 10 people in Likhoua village near Bambouti.
  - 3R placed land mines on a bridge in Moumdji near Bocaranga and set up checkpoint demanding payment for crossing the river.

=== October ===
- 1 October: Heavy clashes erupted in Ngaoundaye between 3R and MINUSCA after authorities tried to conduct voter registration in the area despite 3R's ban. Officials were forced to retreat.
- 2 October: Traffic resumed at Moumdji bridge after Rwandan peacekeepers removed land mines.
- 7 October: 3R took control of Nana-Bakassa.
- 23 October: Clashes erupted between two factions of Anti-balaka in Batangafo. Clashes were also reported later between Anti-balaka and ex-Séléka in the city. Seven people were killed (including three civilians and four militiamen) and more than 100 injured.

=== November ===
- 19 November: FACA withdrew from Bozoum.
- 21 November: Five people were killed and seven injured after clashes between UPC and FPRC in Aigbando, 70 km from Bria.
- 22 November:
  - One person was killed and two injured after clashes between FACA and USMS forces in Paoua.
  - UPC raided a South Sudanese village killed a local doctor.
- 23 November: In response, self-defense forces from South Sudan attacked Bambouti, kicking UPC out of the city and killing some of their fighters. They withdrew a few hours later. UPC militants kidnapped the local mayor after returning to Bambouti.

=== December ===
- 1 December: Sudanese Arab militias attacked Boromata village. They were repulsed by Goula militias. A few people were killed.
- 2 December: Fulani rebels attacked Ngouvota village near Kaga-Bandoro killing four people including pregnant woman. One rebel was killed by civilians.
- 4 December:
  - After Constitutional Court cancelled candidacy of Francois Bozize in presidential elections armed Anti-balaka militias ransacked buildings of international organization in Bossangoa. In Bangui police surrounded some districts looking for Anti-balaka militants.
  - MINUSCA set up a temporary operation base in Boromata following clashes.
- 8 December: Clashes erupted between FACA and UPC rebels in Bambari resulting in a few rebels being killed.
- 10 December: Sudanese Arab militias attacked Ndélembé village near Birao injuring a few people. They were repulsed after 13 hours by forces from Boromata.
- 15 December:
  - Anti-balaka leader, Yvon Konaté, was arrested near Bossembélé while travelling to Bossangoa. Group of armed men was spotted near Bossembélé.
  - Anti-balaka took control of Gaga and Zawa near Yaloke. Three FACA soldiers were killed in Zawa.
  - Anti-balaka took control of Nandobo near Berberati kidnapping local gendarmes.
- 18 December: Anti-balaka attacked Yaloké and Bossembélé. Yaloké was captured by rebels and four soldiers were killed. Bossembélé was also reportedly captured by rebels. Reinforcement was sent from Bangui to recapture Bossembélé. Boda and Mbaiki were also reportedly captured by rebels.
- 19 December: MINUSCA was deployed in rebel-held Bossembélé and Bossemptele to restore peace. Gallo was captured by rebels. Heavy clashes erupted in Mbaiki between rebels and FACA supported by Russian mercenaries.
- 20 December: UPC captured Grimari after bypassing MINUSCA roadblock. North of Sibut UPC advances were blocked in Gbakobanga. Rebels captured barrier in Bouar.
- 21 December: Rebels took control of Baboua. Heavy clashes erupted between rebels and government forces on the road between Bossembele and Boali.
- 22 December: UPC captured center of Bambari. Rebels reportedly captured Boyali. Government reinforcement was sent from Boali.
- 23 December: Rebels took control of Mambere near Berberati on Nola axis. Rebels took control of Beloko and Cantonnier near Cameroonian border. Rebels withdrew from Bouar and Bambari.
- 24 December: Rebels encircled Boali. Heavy clashes erupted between rebels and government forces in Bobangui near Pissa.
- 25 December: Three peacekeepers were killed by unknown attackers in Bakouma and Dekoa.
- 27 December: First round of general elections was held. Rebels again took control of Bouar.
- 28 December: Rebels took control of Gamboula and Baoro.
- 29 December: Government forces withdrew from Bakouma after being surrounded by UPC and FPRC fighters.
- 30 December: Rebels withdrew from Beloko and Cantonnier. Rebels withdrew from Carnot.

== 2021 ==
=== January ===
Situation in Central African Republic on 3 January 2021 at height of CPC control

- 3 January: Rebels took control of Bangassou forcing soldiers to withdraw towards MINUSCA base according to reports.
- 6 January: Government forces recaptured Bagandou killing 24 rebels. Anti-balaka rebels took control of it earlier this week.
- 9 January: MINUSCA forces assisted by French jets repelled rebel attack on Bouar.
- 13 January: Rebels attack the capital city, Bangui with a 200 strong force killing one UN peacekeeper, but they were repelled.
- 15 January: Rebels ambushed a Burundian peacekeeper in the town of Grimari killing him and injuring two Bangladeshi peacekeepers.
- 16 January: Rebels withdrew from Bangassou.
- 17 January: Rebels again took control of Bouar.
- 18 January: Heavy clashes erupted between UPC rebels and MINUSCA 15 kilometers from Bangassou on Gambo axis resulting in eight rebels and three peacekeepers being killed.
- 24 January: Government forces recaptured Boda from rebels.
- 26 January: Government forces reportedly recaptured Boyali killing 44 rebels.
- 29 January: Government forces recaptured Mpoko Ngbodo from rebels.

=== February ===
- 4 February: Government forces recaptured Bossembele.
- 6 February: Government forces recaptured Yaloke.
- 8 February: Government forces recaptured Baoro and Bossemptele. Rebels withdrew from Bouar.
- 10 February:
  - Government forces recaptured Baboua.
  - Government forces destroyed UPC checkpoint at Kombélé, 10 km from Bambari.
  - Government forces recaptured Ndassima.
- 11 February: Government forces recaptured Beloko border crossing from rebels.
- 12 February: Government forces repelled UPC attack on Ndassima after four hour combat.
- 18 February: Government forces pushed UPC rebels from Bambari.
- 19 February: Government forces captured Ippy.
- 20 February:
  - Rebels withdrew from Bozoum.
  - CPC fighters led by Mahamat Salleh withdrew from Niyakari on Bangassou-Bakouma axis towards Nzacko and Yalinga.
- 22 February: Rebels repelled attack by government forces on Bossangoa.
- 23 February: Rebels repelled government attack west of Berberati.
- 24 February: Government forces captured Bossangoa. Rebels returned to Bozoum.
- 25 February: Government forces captured Benzambe near Bossangoa and Bozoum.
- 26 February: Government forces captured Kambakota near Bossangoa.

=== March ===
Map of situation in Bria before it was recaptured by government forces in March 2021

- 4 March: Government forces took control of Babaza village 30 km west of Berberati and Bouca.
- 5 March: Government forces captured road to Gamboula and Abba Government forces recaptured Bozoum–Paoua road.
- 7 March: Government forces captured Ngakobo., Amada Gaza. and Gamboula.
- 8 March: Government forces captured Kouango and Bokolobo.
- 9 March: UPC rebels took control of Niakari north of Bangassou.
- 11 March: Government forces recaptured Manga village between Bozoum and Bocaranga.
- 12 March: Government forces recaptured Ndjoukou.
- 17 March: Government forces recaptured Nanga-Boguila.
- 18 March: Rebels withdrew from Ngaoundaye and Bakouma, however they remained present in the vicinity of them. Russian mercenaries took control of Alindao.
- 21 March: Government forces repelled rebel attack on Bokolobo.
- 22 March: Government forces recaptured Bria. One FPRC fighter was killed.
- 23 March: Rebels stole seven vehicles belonging to humanitarian mission in Bakouma and forced workers to return to Bangassou.
- 24 March: Government forces attacked rebel positions in Bessan near Bouar. The village was captured by government forces.
- 25 March: 3R rebels returned to Ngaoundaye. Nana-Bakassa and Kouki were reported to be under government control.
- 27 March: Russian mercenaries captured Mbrès from rebels, killing two rebels.
- 28 March: Russian mercenaries withdrew from Mbres to Bamingui. Rebels returned to the village.

=== April ===
- 2 April: Rebels attacked Bria which was repelled. One soldiers and two rebels were killed.
- 5 April: Government forces recaptured Aba town northwest of Bouar.
- 6 April:
  - UPC reportedly left Coalition of Patriots for Change.
  - After two days of fighting government forces repelled rebel attack on Ippy.
- 7 April: Government forces captured Niem.
- 9 April: Russian mercenaries again arrived in Mbres forcing rebels to withdraw.
- 10 April:
  - Government forces recaptured Bakala and Mourouba.
  - Government forces entered Kaga-Bandoro from Dekoa and Mbres. They captured the town after short exchange of fire.
- 12 April: Government forces recaptured Batangafo.
- 15 April: Government forces recaptured Kabo.
- 16 April: Three FACA soldiers were killed near Am Dafock by Misseriya Arabs aligned with CPC.
- 19 April: Government forces recaptured Moyenne-Sido and Markounda.
- 22 April: Russian mercenaries took control of Yalinga.
- 27 April: Russian mercenaries took control of Nzako.
- 28 April: Government forces recaptured Yelowa.
- 30 April: Russian forces arrived in Paviika village near Alindao after information about UPC rebels presence night before. They withdrew after murdering one man. Rebels returned and started burning homes and murdered seven people.

=== May ===
- 3 May: 3R rebels entered Berra village near Abba.
- 4 May: Government forces captured Mobaye.
- 5 May: Government forces repelled 3R attack on Abba.
- 6 May: Government forces recaptured Dimbi, Kembe, Poumbolo and Gambo.
- 8 May: 3R rebels attacked Baboua.
- 10 May: Government forces recaptured Bakouma.
- 11 May: Government forces destroyed rebel base on Batangafo-Bekondjo axis near border with Chad seizing equipment.
- 12 May: Armed forces withdrew from Am Dafock following attacks by Misseriya Arabs.
- 15 May: Heavy clashes erupted in Boyo between Russian mercenaries and UPC rebels. 20 people were killed and the village was seized by Russians day later.
- 17 May: Rebels killed 10 people in Grevaï village near Kaga-Bandoro.
- 18–20 May: One soldiers and multiple rebels were killed in clashes in Bemal.
- 24 May: Government forces recaptured Grevaï.
- 26 May:
  - 3R rebels attacked army positions in Djim in Ouham-Pende killing one soldier. Attack was repelled.
  - Russian mercenaries killed three rebels in Bongou village near Bria.
- 27 May: 3R rebels encircled Djim forcing local population to flee. Ngaoundaye was captured by Russian mercenaries.
- 28 May:
  - Rebels attacked Bozoum from three axes cutting telephone lines. Armed forces repelled attack killing one fighter.
  - Three Russian mercenaries and two police officers were killed and five members of local security forces were wounded when their armored vehicle hit a land mine on the road between Berbérati and Bouar.
- 29 May: Government forces recaptured Koui.
- 30 May: Russian mercenaries attacked Sourou in Chad killing six soldiers. In response Chadian soldiers raided territory of Central African Republic.
- 31 May: 3R rebels attacked Makounzi Wali village on Bocaranga-Bouar axis before withdrawing few hours later.

=== June ===
- 5 June: One soldiers and two rebels were killed in UPC attack on Bambari.
- 10 June: 14 people were in killed in clashes between herders and farmers in Bamingui-Bangoran province.
- c. 12 June: UPC recaptured Boyo village. Russians killed UPC general in Bokolobo village.
- 19 June: Russian mercenaries took control of Aigbando killing 10 people.
- 22 June: 3R rebels attack armed forces in Kaïna and Djaoro lim villages killing some of them.
- 23 June: Eight armed men attacked Beltounou village near Kabo killing four people and forcing most of local population to flee to Kabo.
- 24 June: Armed forces reportedly withdrew from Koui, Man, Ndim, Wouro, Soûlé and Bowaï.
- 25 June: Government forces took control of Kaga-Bandoro–Ndele axis.
- 27 June: Government forces recaptured Ndele.
- 28 June: UPC rebels attacked Alindao.
- 29 June: Armed forces repelled attack on Alindao. However, as of 1 July it was reported that UPC rebels were still present in the town.

=== July ===
- 2 July:
  - Rebels withdrew from Alindao following arrival of Russian mercenaries.
  - Russians ambushed UPC rebels in Malouma forcing them to flee and killing eight of them.
  - Armed forces with help of Russians recaptured Mboutago summarily executing around 30 rebels.
- 8 July: Russian forces clashed with 3R rebels.
- 10 July: 3R rebels erected checkpoints in Bokongo, Boyabane and Bongbalo at Bozoum-Bossemptele road.
- 12 July: 3R rebels blocked road from Bozoum to Bossangoa, Paoua, Bossemptele and Bouar.
- 14 July: Russians killed four FPRC rebels in Aigbando.
- 15 July: CPC rebels raided Miamani village on Ndele-Golongosso axis looting local shops.
- 16 July: 3R rebels withdrew from villages on roads to Bozoum and moved to mining areas near the town.
- 21 July: 12 civilians were killed near Bossangoa. It is unclear who was responsible for this with Russian mercenaries, UN peacekeepers and CPC rebels both being blamed.
- 26 July: Two soldiers were killed in 3R attack 15 km from Yéléwa.
- 26–7 July: Government forces repelled UPC attack on Obo. One soldier was killed.
- 27 July: 31 FPRC fighters led by Ousta Ali surrendered their weapons in Bria. They were hiding in bush near the town since April.
- 31 July:
  - 15 people including five FACA soldiers were killed following clashes with 3R rebels in Mann.
  - 100 fighters surrendered their weapons in Bria including UPC on Yalinga axis and FPRC fighters on Ouadda axis. 50 Anti-balaka fighters led by "Bokassa" in Irabanda village surrendered with more to be disarmed in future. 100 weapons in total were collected.

=== August ===
- 5 August: Heavy clashes between 3R rebels and Russian mercenaries erupted west of Koui.
- 9 August: Armed forces reportedly destroyed rebel base 1 km from place where massacre near Bossangoa happened.
- 10 August: Government forces with support of Rwandans and Russians launched disarmament campaign in Ouham-Pende including Bang, Bocaranga, Koui, Ndim, Mann and Niem villages.
- 17 August: 3R rebels killed two motorcycle drivers in Boyabane village on Bozoum-Bossemptele road.
- 20 August: Russian forces using four helicopters attacked 3R positions west of Koui killing three people.
- 23 August: Heavy clashes were ongoing between Russian mercenaries and 3R rebels in Sabewa, Bozou and other villages. At least one rebel and Russian soldier were killed. Three Russian vehicles were torched.
- 24 August: 3R rebels kidnapped three people on the outskirts of Bozoum.
- 25 August: Two motorcycle drivers were killed by mine explosions in Ouham-Pende.
- 29 August: Around 50 3R rebels attacked Dilapoko village killing one person.
- 29–31 August: In offensive against 3R rebels Russian forces bombed Beïna village in Mambere-Kadei (on 29 August), Nguia-Bouar in Baboua sub-prefecture (30 August) and Lamy-Pont in Abba sub-prefecture. Three people were killed.

=== September ===
- 1 September:
  - 3R rebels attacked convoy at Beloko-Baboua road killing two people and injuring two.
  - Six 3R rebels were arrested in Cameroon in Ngaoundere trying to kidnap for ransom a citizen.
- 2 September: 3R rebels occupied Zoukombo village on Beloko-Baboua road. They withdrew later that day.
- 3 September:
  - Two civilians and two rebels were killed in clashes between Russian mercenaries and UPC rebels in Maloum village.
  - Armed forces from Bria attacked rebel base in Atongo Bakari inflicting casualties.
- 5 September:
  - Government forces destroyed rebel base near Moyenne-Sido after clashing with rebels. They reportedly discovered a few surface-air missiles produced in Yugoslavia.
  - Government forces discovered rebel warehouse east of Bozoum on Bata axis containing automatic weapons and ammunition.
- 7 September: Russian mercenaries killed 40 Fulani herders in Nassoya village 40 km from Baboua.
- 10 September: An aid worker of the Danish Refugee Council was killed and three others wounded by an IED in Ouham-Pendé.
- 12 September: UPC rebels entered Kpokpo village near Yalinga before withdrawing later that day.
- 13 September: Russian mercenaries using 3 helicopters landed in Gbéti village in Cameroon and Banga village in CAR. They clashes with 3R rebels. Operation continued on next day.
- 14 September: 3R rebels entered Mann village pillaging local shops before withdrawing later that day.
- 15 September: During operation in Mambere-Kadei near Bolambili village armed forces discovered rebel warehouse with land mines and anti-air missiles.
- c. 16 September: New splinter group from UPC led by Hassan Bouba was reportedly created. The group claims to have more than 700 fighters and expressed willingness to return to peace agreement with the government.
- 18 September: Heavy clashes erupted between Russian mercenaries and UPC rebels in Mingala.
- 19 September: Two soldiers were killed in rebel attack on Kakomale village near Kaga-Bandoro.
- 20 September: Banga village in Mambéré-Kadéï was recaptured by 3R rebels after heavy fighting.
- 22 September: One soldier was killed in UPC attack on Biadé village on Bambari-Ippy axis.
- 25 September: Two people were killed and three injured by unidentified armed men on Kabo-Moyenne Sido axis.
- 27 September: Russian mercenaries again captured Banga village one week after it was seized by rebels.
- 28 September: Two soldiers were killed and two kidnapped in UPC attack on Kombele village near Bambari.
- 30 September: Russian mercenaries attacked UPC positions near Ngakobo, in Pouloubou and Kolo. In Nagkobo, 13 civilians were killed. In Pouloubou 19 civilians and 6 UPC rebels were killed and a UPC general was injured. In Kolo an estimated 42 people were killed.

=== October ===
- 2 October: Three mercenaries and two rebels were killed in a rebel attack on a Russian convoy in Bombo in Mambéré-Kadéï.
- 3 October:
  - Five civilians were killed in a land mine explosion when their motorcycle paced over it in the town of Bocaranga.
  - Wagner Corp mercenaries attacked the village of Dewa killing six and wounding 13 civilians.
- 5 October:
  - At least 34 people were killed in an ambush on a civilian convoy in Matchika village on Bambari-Alindao axis. Government has blamed UPC rebels, which have denied the claim. According to CorbeauNews for massacre was responsible general Kiri who was member of splinter faction of UPC led by Hassana Bouba.
  - Seven humanitarian workers were kidnapped by unidentified armed men in Ngatoua village on Bouca-Batangafoa axis. Five of them were released right away and remaining two on 7 October.
- 6 October: Rebels arrived in Lafolo, Pananga and Ngaboudou villages near Ippy forcing population to flee to Bria.
- 7 October:
  - UPC rebels attacked Ngakobo before being repelled by FACA. Two civilians were killed.
  - Nine armed rebels were arrested by armed forces in Liotto village on Grimari-Kouango axis.
- 8 October: UPC rebels took control of Dimbi in Basse-Kotto.
- 11 October: Five Wagner Corporation mercenaries were killed and one injured when their convoy was ambushed by 3R rebels in Banga in Mambéré-Kadéï. Three rebels were killed and others three wounded carrying out the ambush.
- 12 October:
  - UPC rebels attacked government positions in Gobolo neighborhood in Bria before being repelled. Two rebels and one Russian fighter were killed. Three soldiers and four Russians were injured.
  - UPC rebels attacked Ippy. Clashes lasted for a few hours.
  - Two men were injured on Kabo-Moyenne Sido axis by unidentified armed men.
- 13 October: A man and woman were injured on Kabo-Moyenne Sido axis by unidentified armed men.
- 4–14 October: 332 fighters from FPRC, UPC, Anti-balaka and MPC surrendered in Bria. 272 firearms, 30 rockets and 40 grenades were collected.
- 14 October:
  - UPC rebels attacked Alindao. Attack was repelled.
  - Three soldiers were killed and five injured in 3R attack near Ngaoundaye.
- 15 October:
  - A vehicle was torched and a man was killed by alleged UPC rebels in Mbollo village on Bambari-Alindao axis.
  - President Touadera announced unliteral ceasefire with armed groups. All armed groups except for UPC and FPRC reportedly agreed.
- 16 October: Seven people were killed by Russian mercenaries in Benzambe village northeast of Bossangoa.
- 19 October: Two UPC generals who wanted to surrender to the government were arrested by Ali Darassa in Boyo village.
- 26 October: One person was killed by alleged 3R rebels in Kaita village near Mann.
- 27 October Armed forces attacked UPC rebel positions in Balission village on Maloum-Galougou axis. A few people were killed on both sides including 10 civilians in Boïni village.
- 28 October: 14 UPC soldiers and some generals including Moussa Issa left UPC to join Hassan Bouba's splinter faction.
- 30 October:
  - Landmine exploded under FACA vehicle in Bondiba injuring soldiers.
  - UPC rebels burned four vehicles in an attack on Dar es Salaam village near Ngakobo.
  - Armed forces returned to Rafai after eight years of absence.
- 31 October:
  - According to government sources, rebels used improvised drones to bomb a FACA base near Abba – first use of such technology by rebels.
  - Armed forces launched an offensive against 3R rebels in Lamy-Pont and Nguia-Bouar villages. 5,000 people were displaced, 20 killed and injured including three civilians executed by Russian mercenaries near the border with Cameroon. Many homes were looted. Soldiers returned to Bouar on 7 November.

=== November ===
- 1 November: 10 Egyptian peacekeepers were injured by FACA soldiers.
- 6 November: 3R rebels attacked Létélé northwest of Bocaranga. One soldier and 10 rebels were killed.
- 7 November: Russian mercenaries executed UPC general Ali Tato with his wife in Shimbolo village on Bambari-Alindao axis. He was reportedly trying to surrender.
- 11 November: Armed forces attacked 3R position in Bagari village near border with Cameroon killing three rebels and freeing four teenage boys kidnapped by them.
- 13 November:
  - 17 UPC and three Anti-balaka rebels laid down their weapons in Alindao. They were transferred to Bangui and while travelling through Bokolobo they were attacked by other UPC rebels.
  - Three Fulani herders were killed by Russian mercenaries in Kpare village in Nana–Mambéré.
- 14 November:
  - Armed forces supported by Russians attacked 3R position in Kaïta village near Mann killing one rebel and injuring another. In response rebels attacked army in Mbae-Mbéré village nearby. One soldier, two Russian mercenaries and 12 civilians were killed. Eight civilians and three rebels were injured and one soldier was captured.
  - Sudanese poachers attacked Russian mercenaries near Kouki village killing four people. In response Russians attacked nearby mining areas killing 19 artisanal miners.
- 16 November: Russian mercenaries attacked 3R rebels in Kowone village near Ndim forcing them to retreat. They killed one civilian.
- 17 November: Seven soldiers were killed and two injured in 3R attack somewhere in Nana-Mambere province.
- 18 November: Russian mercenaries attacked rebel positions Kparé village near Baboua. Four Russians and one 3R rebels were killed. One Anti-balaka fighter was injured.
- 19 November:
  - Hassan Bouba, leader of UPC faction was arrested in Bangui by gendarmerie. He was eventually released on 26 November.
  - Armed forces destroyed rebel camp near Moyenne-Sido seizing weapons and ammunition.
- 20 November: Five people were killed and five injured in Yidéré village near Cameroonian border by Russian mercenaries.
- 21 November: 3R rebels attacked Russians in Yidéré village in Mambéré-Kadéï. Fighting lasted for two hours with killed on both sides.
- 23 November: 12 people were killed by Russian mercenaries in Godawa village near Dilapoko, according to testimony of woman who survived and fled to Cameroon.
- 24 November: Armed forces destroyed UPC camp led by general Garga near Bokolobo freeing one hostage. Rebels fled towards Ngakobo.
- 25 November: Russian mercenaries attacked Aïgbado village near Bria killing people and livestock, burning down building and arresting 12 people.
- 26 November: 15 CPC rebels allegedly surrounded and disarmed group of five MINUSCA peacekeepers on Bodjomo-Boguila road. However MINUSCA officially denied this claiming that peacekeepers repelled attack by rebels.
- 28 November:
  - Five people were killed by FACA in Loura village near Bocaranga.
  - (week of) 12 people were killed and 36 injured by Russian mercenaries in Ngoundja village 65 km from Bria on Sam-Ouandja axis. They were attacked for illegal artisanal mining.
  - 3R rebels attacked government forces in Keita village 80 km from Bocaranga. 30 people were killed including three soldiers and more than 20 civilians.
- 29 November: At least 20 civilians were killed in 3R attack on Ndakaya village west of Koui.
- 30 November: Two Russian mercenaries were killed in 3R attack on Yidéré village.

=== December ===
- 2 December: UPC rebels took control of Kouango after clashing with government forces. One police officer was killed and one civilian injured.
- 3 December: Government forces recaptured Kouango.
- 5 December: UPC rebels killed 5 civilians in Ngouroundou village on Bria-Yalinga axis.
- 6 December: Eight people including seven women were reportedly lynched by Anti-balaka for witchcraft in Ndoumbou village near Bouca.
- 9 December:
  - MPC rebels attacked Mbres killing one officer. It was recaptured later that day by government forces.
  - Government forces repelled UPC attack on Boyo village. In response armed forces supported by pro-government faction of Anti-balaka killed 11 Muslim civilians in the village.
- 10 December:
  - MINUSCA peacekeepers clashes with group of Anti-balaka fighters in Tagbara village.
  - Russian mercenaries clashed with rebels in Bidja village near Batangafo. They then entered Chadian village of Djormere where they clashes with Chadian army killing one soldier and kidnapping another.
- 11 December: Anti-balaka fighters from pro-government faction attacked Goya village near Kouango killing 10 civilians.
- 12 December: Ali Darassa was appointed chief of staff of Coalition of Patriots for Change, two weeks after UPC officially returned to CPC.
- 15 December:
  - Anti-balaka attacked Boyo killing and injuring people. MINUSCA peacekeepers were sent to the area.
  - CPC rebels recaptured Nzacko following withdrawal of armed forces.
  - UPC general, Didier Wangaï, was killed in clashes with pro-government faction of Anti-balaka in Gallougou village. His head was cut off and shown in Bambari.
- 16 December: Pro-government faction of Anti-balaka murdered five people in Zimako village on Ippy-Galougou axis.
- 18 December:
  - 3R rebels clashes with armed forces in Mann occupying the town until the next morning. One rebels, one soldier and four civilians were killed.
  - Unidentified armed men occupied Ndjoukou for two days.
- 20–21 December: 100 UPC rebels surrendered in Alindao, including four generals.
- 23 December: UPC rebels entered Boyo.
- 25 December:
  - c. Two men were killed by CPC rebels in attack on truck on Batangafo-Kabo axis.
  - 18 people were killed and 29 injured by pro-government faction of Anti-balaka in Lougba and Mandjo village on Bambari-Bakala axis.
  - MINUSCA peacekeepers launched operation in Boyo forcing around 200 UPC fighters to withdraw.
- 28 December: Five people were injured in 3R attack on Bezéré. Two civilians were injured in another attack on Mbinaï village near Cameroon.
- 29 December:
  - UPC attacked Ngakobo killing one gendarme and occupying the town until withdrawing after reinforcement arrived.
  - FACA soldier was killed near Bouca. According to some sources he was killed in battle with CPC rebels, while according to others he was killed by Russians after being mistaken for CPC rebel.
- 30 December: Three MINUSCA peacekeepers were injured in landmine explosion in near Batouri Bole village in Mambéré-Kadéï.
- 31 December:
  - Three MINUSCA peacekeepers were injured in mine explosion in Bohong village in Ouham-Pende.
  - Around 50 3R rebels invaded Bania village in Mambéré-Kadéï.

== 2022 ==
=== January ===
- 2 January:
  - 3R rebels and armed forces clashes in Djakoundou village in Ouham-Pende. One rebel and some soldiers were killed. Two civilians were killed, five injured and 20 houses burnt.
  - 3R rebels attacked Létélé killing at least two soldiers.
- 4 January:
  - Armed forces and CPC rebels clashed in Kambakota. Four rebels were killed.
  - Four people were killed by Russian mercenaries in Bria.
- 6 January: 90 UPC rebels including general Robo surrendered in Ngakobo.
- 9 January: Two civilians were killed in Ouham-Pende, one in Boina village by 3R rebels, other in Boyabane village by FACA soldiers.
- 11 January: Three civilians were killed and six injured by Chadian mercenaries in Kare village on Batangafo-Kambakota axis.
- 14 January:
  - UPC rebels and pro-government faction of Anti-balaka clashes in Yagoundaba village on Ippy-Kollo axis. 10-12 Anti-balaka fighters were killed.
  - 3R rebels attacked Herbo village near Chadian border burning down hundreds of homes and displacing thousands of people.
- 16 January: Russian mercenaries conducted operation in Aïgbado village against UPC rebels. During the operation they killed around 65 civilians. Two Russians were killed.
- 18 January: Russian mercenaries and UPC rebels clashes in Nguipa village on Bokolobo-Lema axis.
- 22 January:
  - Armed Fulanis attacked Ketté-Sido village in Ouham killing three people.
  - 3R rebels ambushed Russian mercenaries near Yelowa village in Ouham-Pende.
- 24 January: At least 11 people were killed in attack by Russian mercenaries on Sabo village near border with Chad.
- c. 29 January: Armed forces clashed with UPC rebels in Boyo village injuring a few rebels.

=== February ===
- 1 February: UPC rebels attacked Atongo Bakari village killing three people.
- 2 February: Pro-government faction of Anti-balaka attacked Komayo village near Boyo killing seven people. In response UPC rebels attacked them. Four Anti-balaka and one UPC militiamen were killed.
- 7 February: Six people were killed and one injured by unknown gunmen in Nguia-Bouar.
- 9 February: 90 civilians were allegedly killed by Russian mercenaries in Mouka and Yangoudroudja villages in Haute-Kotto. However other sources denied this.
- 12 February: Damane Zakaria, leader of RPRC armed groups was killed with 20 rebels in Ouadda by Russian mercenaries.
- 13 February: Four people were killed and three injured after armed men suspected to be 3R rebels set fire to homes in Touga village near Ngaoundaye.
- c. 17 February: Around 100 Russian mercenaries arrived in Sam Ouandja causing local population to flee to Birao.
- 18 February: 3R rebels attacked Gadzi town displacing and injuring many people.
- 20 February: Armed forces repelled UPC attack on Alindao.
- 24 February:
  - UPC rebels clashes with Anti-balakas in Mbiakreu village near Ippy, at least nine people were killed.
  - UPC rebels attack public vehicle on road from Ippy looting them.
  - MINUSCA forces launched operation in Ouandago village arresting 11 self-defense fighters armed with artisanal weapons.
- 25 February: Anti-balaka fighters attacked merchants killing one person and kidnapping and looting others in Gbakara village on Bossangoa-Bouca axis.

=== March ===
- 3 March:
  - A truck carrying four people struck an IED in Ouham-Péndé prefecture killing two and injuring two.
  - After rebel injured a motorcycle driver, armed forces destroyed their base between Gaïkouda and Bezambé.
- 5 March: Russian mercenaries captured Nzacko village clashing with FPRC rebels. 2 Russians and 5 rebels were killed.
- 6–9 March: Armed forces conducted operations against rebels from CPC in Ndah in Vakaga as well as on N'dele-Chari axis where they clashed with local herders in Tiri.
- 8 March: FPRC rebels recaptured Nzacko village after Wagner mercenaries left the town.
- c. 10 March: UPC leader Colonel Djibril was assassinated by his own men out of suspicion of colluding with the Russians.
- 11 March: Russian mercenaries and FPRC rebels clashes in Gounda village near N'dele. Four Russians, six rebels and two civilians were killed. Rebels withdrew from the village and Russians continued to Gordile, where they killed at least 15 people. They also arrived in Tirigoulou where they killed 12 people including former FPRC general.
- 12 March: At least 17 civilians were killed by Russian mercenaries in Kota-Gbaya near Markounda.
- 14 March: Rwandan forces attacked rebel position in Ramadan village on Bamingui-Mbrés axis killing two rebels.
- 15 March:
  - Armed clashes between Russians who arrived from N'dele and rebels in Sikikede village. At least 20 people were killed on both sides. They later went on to Birao before returning to N'dele.
  - Armed forces supported by Russian mercenaries arrived in Ouanda Djallé village in Vakaga.
- 18 March: Armed forces repelled CPC attack on Bouca.
- 22 March: 3R rebels took control of Nzakoundou village after battle with government forces.
- 23 March: 3R rebels attacked mining site near Nguia-Bouar killing two people.
- 25 March:
  - Four 3R rebels were killed by Russian mercenaries near border with Chad. Nzakoundou village was recaptured by government forces.
  - Rebels occupied Sans Souci village on Bria-Ouadda axis. Some people fled the village.
- 27 March: Government forces again recaptured Nzacko.
- 29 March: Government forces clashed with FPRC rebels in Gbolo village nar Bakouma. One person was injured.
- 30 March:
  - CPC rebels occupied Yangou-Mango village on Bria-Ippy axis blocking movement.
  - UPC rebels attacked travelling people in Tagbia village on Bambari-Alindao axis looting their belongings.

=== April ===
- 1 April:
  - Four people were murdered by FPRC rebels in Kono village on Nzacko-Bakouma axis. They also kidnapped six people.
  - A merchant was killed by CPC rebels on Bossangoa-Benzambé axis, they stole his motorcycle.
- 2 April: A few merchants were kidnapped by CPC rebels in Zeré village on Bossangoa-Bouca axis. Some of them were injured with bullets.
- 3 April:
  - One police officer was shot dead by suspected CPC rebels in Ngouaboutou village on Bria-Ippy axis.
  - 3R rebels attacked Samoh village on Boguila-Bozoum axis killing five people. Day later they set fire to a few houses in nearby Boaya village.
- 3–8 April: 3R rebels attacked civilian population in villages near Gadzi killing tens of people and displacing more than one thousand.
- 5 April:
  - CPC rebels attacked Ngbagueré village 70 km from Ippy killing three people.
  - CPC rebels attacked a bishop near Nana-Bakassa stealing his belongings.
- 7 April: CPC rebels attacked humanitarian convoy on Alindao-Mingala axis injuring five people.
- 8 April:
  - Anti-balaka fighters attacked a Fulani camp in Zawa near Yaloke, killing at least a dozen people.
- 9 April: Armed men attacked a humanitarian vehicle in Nzeleté village on Alindao-Bambari axis, injuring two people.
- 11 April:
  - 13 people were killed by pro-government faction of Anti-balaka in Fulani camp in Bekadili village near Yaloke.
  - Russian mercenaries killed between 10 and 22 people and burned motorcycles in Gordila and Ndah villages in Vakaga. UN launched investigation into the killings.
- 13 April: Armed men ambushed healthcare workers in Koui stealing medications, cash, motorcycles and cell phones.
- 14 April: Armed Chadians attacked Gbazara village on Batangafo-Kabo axis injuring two women.
- 16 April: Russian mercenaries clashes with 3R rebels west of Amada-Gaza town near border with Cameroon. One rebel was killed, one rebel and one Russian injured, rebels withdrew from the position.
- 17 April: A South Sudanese citizen was killed by UPC rebels in Bambouti.
- 18 April: Cameroon deployed hundreds of troops to the eastern border with C.A.R. to free hostages who were kidnapped by rebels operating at the border. 35 people were kidnapped by them in previous three weeks.
- 22 April: Group of armen men entered Batangafo trying to loot local merchant. Armed forces arrived and repelled them>
- 23 April: Six people including local imam were killed by Russian mercenaries in Ndassima.
- 24 April:
  - Armed rebels attacked a humanitarian convoy on Batangafo-Ouandago axis stealing belongings. They also attacked motorcycle drivers on Batangafo-Kambakota axis injuring two people.
  - Pro-government faction of Anti-balaka invaded Tambia village on Bambari-Alindao axis arresting one person and displacing local population.
- 25 April: Russians supported by armed forces attacked a UPC position in Lioto villages, killing two rebels. One Russian was injured.
- 27–28 April: Armed forces conducted operation against Anti-balaka, FPRC and MPC rebels around Kouki allegedly killing around 17 civilians and injuring some.
- 28 April: 11 soldiers and three rebels were killed in rebel attack on Nzacko.
- 29 April: 3R rebels looted belongings of 200 people on Abba-Gallo axis injuring one person.

=== May ===
- 7 May: Russian mercenaries and armed forces clashed with 3R rebels 90 km from Gadzi on Zawa axis forcing them to withdraw. 200 people were displaced by the clashes.
- 8 May: FPRC general Moctar Adam was gunned down by Russian mercenaries in N'délé together with his two brothers while trying to evade arrest. Five people were injured including at least one soldier.
- 9 May: UPC rebels launched attacks on two checkpoints outside Bokolobo. Two soldiers, three UPC rebels, eight militiamen from the pro-government faction of Anti-balaka and one woman were killed. Afterwards pro-government forces allegedly murdered 23 people in Fulani camp.
- 11 May:
  - MINUSCA and armed forces announced a joint operation in Bambari against armed groups in Mingala.
  - FPRC and UPC rebels took control of Ouadda. Five soldiers were killed, six injured and 13 captured by rebels.
- 15 May: Armed forces repelled 3R attack on Nzakoundou killing three attackers. In Sam Ouandja UPC rebels stabbed a trader.
- 20 May:
  - Chadian mercenaries looted truck on Batanagafo-Bouca axis kidnapping one person for ransom.
  - Pro-government faction of Anti-balaka kidnapped mayor of Tambia village and killed his son.
- 21 May:
  - FPRC rebels attacked Nzacko forcing soldiers to withdraw. 11 soldiers and two rebels were killed. One soldiers was captured and six rebels were injured.
  - Three Chadian mercenaries were killed by armed forces on Batangafo-Ouandago axis.
- 22 May:
  - UPC rebels attacked Digui crossing near Ngakobo killing six soldiers and injuring five. Then they captured Ngakobo. 11 soldiers were killed, some injured and captured, at least six escaped.
  - Russian mercenaries killed five people and injured 12 in Ndah village in Vakaga.
- 23 May:
  - Rebels withdrew from Nzacko ahead of arrival of Russian mercenaries.
  - After Ndah Russian mercenaries arrived in Gordile and Ndiffa in Vakaga.
- 24 May: Seven people were killed by unidentified armed men outside of Nana-Bakassa.
- 25 May: Russian mercenaries arrived in Tiringoulou causing local population to flee to bush. After that they looted houses.
- 26 May:
  - Russian mercenaries returned to Ndiffa and Gordile where they have stolen a pick up and looted shops.
  - Three Russians were injured in ambush by 3R rebels in Kaita village near Koui.
- 27 May:
  - Two Russian mercenaries were killed and four injured in a rebel ambush in Djouwè village near Bossemptele.
  - Group of armed forces were deployed in Ouadda-Djalle.
- 28 May: Russians looted a market in Sikikede.
- 30 May: 3R rebels destroyed two trucks near Bocaranga killing some soldiers.
- 31 May: A motorcycle driver was shot dead by Chadian mercenaries on Batangafo-Ouandago axis.

=== June ===
- 5 June: One soldier was killed and other captured by 3R rebels in Doko village on Bocaranga-Bang axis.
- 7 June: Armed forces went to Goya. They clashed with UPC rebels north of Goya for two days after which they occupied Goya for three days looting shops and killing one person.
- 8 June: 3R rebels again killed one soldier and captured another in Doko village.
- 11 June:
  - Soldier together with a woman he was driving with were killed by unidentified armed men in Zarami village on Gallo axis.
  - Local self-defense group clashed with CPC rebels in Ndiki village. Two rebels and two self-defense fighters were killed.
- 12 June:
  - Russian mercenaries set fire to mosque in Nguekpa village after group of CPC rebels took refuge inside, killing four men and injuring two women.
- 13 June:
  - Armed forces supported by Russians captured Dimbi after clashing with rebels.
  - Armed forces attacked rebels in Sébagoudé village in Basse-Kotto killing 20 of them and capturing rebel camps.
- 14 June: MINUSCA peacekeepers were deployed until 30 August in Bakouma and Nzacko to protect from rebel attacks.
- 17 June: RPRC, FPRC and UPC rebels took control of Ouadda-Djalle village after clashing with armed forces and killing at least one pro-government fighter. Local population fled to bush.
- 23 June: Armed forces repelled CPC attack on Bakouma. Six rebels and one civilian were killed.
- 26 June: Armed forces recaptured Ouanda-Djalle after clashing with rebels.

=== July ===
- 3 July: Armed forces repelled rebel attack on Dimbi killing 12 rebels and capturing five.
- 14 July: UPC took control of Kembé.
- 16 July: Rebels withdrew from Kembé following arrival of MINUSCA forces.
- 18 July: Armed forces destroyed Anti-balaka base in Ewou village in Basse-Kotto prefecture arresting two people. Anti-balaka commander Nguiambi fled.
- c. 30 July: Multiple rebel groups including FPRC, UPC and RPRC arrived in Gordil village in Vakaga.

=== August ===
- 1 August: Four people including police officer were shot dead near Moyenne Sido by armed men.
- 2 August: Two people were killed by 3R rebels in Lokoti-Bangi village near Baboua.
- 3 August: 3R rebels killed four civilians in Ndiba village near Baboua.
- 4 August: 3R rebels killed young boy on Nana-Bakassa–Kouki axis. Armed forces attacked Poussierre mine nearby killing one Anti-balaka fighter.
- 6 August: Soldier was killed and another injured by Anti-balaka fighters from CPC near Lady village on Bouca-Batangafo axis.
- 17 August: Six armed men were killed by armed forces near Batangafo. Two civilians were killed by armed men.
- 18 August: CPC rebels withdrew from Sam Ouandja following arrival of MINUSCA peacekeepers.
- 22 August:
  - Russian mercenaries arrived in Akoursoulbak village in Bamingui-Bangoran, looting shops, before withdrawing the next day.
  - 3R rebels kidnapped group of people in village on Bozoum-Bossemptele axis.
- 29 August: Armed rebels looted two groups of people near Bouca and Batangafo.

=== September ===
- 2 September: CPC rebels attacked Akoursoulbak. After day of heavy fighting rebels managed to expel armed forces from the town before withdrawing on 4 September.
- 9 September: CPC rebels attacked Aigbando near Bria. After two days of fighting they managed to take control of the town.
- 13 September: Armed forces repelled CPC attack on Gobolo neighborhood in Bria. CPC rebels attacked Kpassoro village near Bria displacing around 500 people.

=== October ===
- 3 October: Three MINUSCA peacekeepers were killed and one injured in mine explosion in Koui.
- 7 – 12 October: 10 people were killed including three civilians in clashes between two Anti-balaka factions in Ndjoukou. Clashes were between pro-government faction led by Ayoloma and pro-CPC faction led by Sioni Mènè.
- 9 October: CPC rebels clashes with armed forces near Markounda with killed and injured on both sides.
- 13 October: Two soldiers were killed and one captured in rebel attack on Ndiba Molé village near Gallo.
- 15 October:
  - Self-defense fighters killed one Misseriya attacker and captured another while they were trying to steal motorcycles in village near Birao.
  - Further clashes between two factions of Anti-balaka occurred in Mourou Kozo village near Ndjoukou.
- 17 October: Armed forces launched attack on UPC position in Kembe with killed and injured on both sides.
- 19 October: Armed forces repelled 3R attack on Mann. One civilian was killed and six people including two soldiers were injured.
- 20 October: Five people were kidnapped by Misseriya Arabs from Am Dafock.
- 22 October: 10 Chadian mercenaries were killed by armed forces near Batangafo.
- 23 October: 3R rebels attacked Mann forcing soldiers to withdraw. 100 houses were burnt by rebels and three civilians killed by soldiers.
- Late October: Chadian rebel group established its base north of Paoua.

=== November ===
- 1 November: CPC rebels attacked Bokolobo kidnapping three soldiers.
- 2 November: CPC rebels attacked soldiers in Koumbélé village 10 km from Bambari.
- 3 November: Two men were shot dead by suspected UPC rebels in forest near Dimbi.
- 4 November: Russian paratroopers raided CPC base in Blakadja village killing one rebel.
- 6 November:
  - One person was killed and two injured in ambush by unidentified armed men on vehicle on Bambari-Ippy axis.
  - Rebels ambushed armed forces in Simbolo village near Bambari.
- 8 November: UPC rebels attacked armed forces in Ngakobo village.
- (week of) 9 November: Group of young traders was murdered by rebels on N'dele-Sarh axis.
- 11 November: PRNC rebels kidnapped three government workers in Ndiffa village in Vakaga province.
- 17 November: UPC rebels attacked Ngouaboudou village on Bria-Ippy axis driving out armed forces. Rebels promptly withdrew from the town. After 24 hours armed forces clashed with them killing two rebels and injuring many others.
- 18 November: Two traders were kidnapped by 3R rebels on the outskirts of Bocaranga.
- 19 November: UPC launched attack on Kouango. The attack was repelled, with one soldier being wounded.
- 22 November: Armed forces were deployed in Ndjoukou after three months of Anti-balaka infighting.
- 25 November: Unidentified armed men invaded Maloum village in Ouaka looting houses.
- 27 November: Sudanese fighters, members of CPC, attacked Am Dafock looting gendarmerie building. They withdrew few hours later due to pressure of local population.
- 28 November:
  - Unknown aircraft struck Russian base in Bossangoa causing damage. Russians responded by firing at it. Two vehicles were burnt and several houses damaged.
  - Anti-balaka rebels attacked vehicle with Chinese workers on Niem-Yelewa axis, kidnapping two people and killing one soldiers.

=== December ===
- 1 December: 11 people were killed and seven injured by UPC rebels in Kolo village on Bakouma-Bangassou axis.
- 4 December: Four armed groups (MLCJ, RPRC, UFR and UFR-R) signed in Bangui an agreement announcing their dissolution.
- 7 December:
  - A trader was robbed and beaten to death in a village 35 km from Mbrès by unidentified armed men.
  - Armed forces and Russian allies took full control of Birao, former headquarters of MLCJ.
- 8–9 December: Armed forces clashed with CPC rebels in Akocho village on Bria-Ndéle axis. In total 24 rebels, 13 pro-government fighters and nine (including two captured and later killed) Wagner mercenaries were killed. Six pro-government fighters were captured by rebels.
- 10–11 December: UPC rebels attacked Boyo village on 10 December and Liotto day later in Ouaka. Two rebels and six soldiers were killed and weapons seized by rebels. Armed forces returned to both villages after a few hours. One civilian was killed in Liotto.
- 12 December: Rebels attacked Bokolobo village, temporarily seizing it. Two attackers and one civilian were killed. One soldier was injured.
- 14 December: UPC rebels torched vehicle of minister Amit Idriss on Bambari-Ngakobo axis.
- 15 December:
  - Three people were kidnapped by armed men near Bokolobo village.
  - Last French troops left the Central African Republic.
- 16 December: Two people were kidnapped by unknown armed men near Ouanda Djalle.
- 17 December: UPC rebels attacked Ngakobo occupying it temporarily.
- 20 December: Two Chadian fighters were killed by armed forces in Kérengué village near Batangafo.
- 23 December: Four soldiers were killed and three injured in rebel attack near Gallo village. One rebel and two civilians were killed in attack by soldiers on Ngbada village. Rebels and civilians fled to village.
- c. 25 December: Nine armed pick-ups and a few dozens of motorcycles were reportedly handed over to PRNC rebels in Ndiffa, Tiringoulou and Gordil villages in Vakaga province.
- 29–30 December: Rebels attacked twice army position in Goya village in Ouaka. Around the same week there were also attacks in Aïgbado and Akoursoulbak villages. One vehicle was torched and people were killed and injured on both sides.

== 2023 ==
=== January ===
- 4 January: Armed men looted vehicle in Gouzé village on Paoua-Bozoum axis. Next day they attacked motorcycle drivers in Kparé village killing one person.
- 4–12 January: In series of three attacks on Birao–Ouanda-Djallé axis by unidentified armed men, one person was killed and several were robbed including a humanitarian convoy.
- 6 January: Russian mercenaries attacked UPC rebels in Goya village killing three of them.
- 7 January: CPC rebels ambushed armed forces in Yenga village near Bouar. Two soldiers were killed and two captured, one civilian was injured.
- 9 January: Four soldiers and three Russians were killed in a clash between the two groups in Digui.
- 12 January: 3R and Anti-balaka rebels attacked Abba. One soldier was killed and another injured. Attack was repelled.
- 14 January: Two Russian mercenaries and three rebels were killed in 3R attack on Yidéré site in Nana-Mambéré.
- 16 January:
  - Armed men attacked seven motorcycle drivers on Birao-Ouanda Djalle axis. Three escaped with one being shot, while four were looted.
  - Alleged 3R rebels invaded Kowone village kidnapping two people. One of them was eventually released on 19 January after payment of 11 million CFA francs in ransom.
- 18 January: Rebels occupied Linguiri village on Bamingui-M'brés axis where they assaulted and robbed local trader.
- 21 January: CPC rebels attacked Béloko. Two Russian mercenaries and one civilian were killed. One soldier was injured and custom building was burned down.
- 23 January:
  - CPC rebels attacked Ngarba village near Ndélé injuring one soldier. They withdrew after a few hours.
  - 3R rebels robbed group of traders near Bokayan village shooting one dead who tried to escape.
- 24 January:
  - 3R rebels attacked Besson killing one soldier.
  - Deputy of representative from Ngaoundaye was kidnapped near the village by 3R rebels. He was eventually released a few days later.
- 25 January: 3R rebels attacked armed forces in Bondiba in Nana-Mambéré forcing them to withdraw.
- 25–6 January: Armed forces and Russian mercenaries attacked Gordil and Ndomboloye villages in Vakaga. Rebels surrounded them forcing them to withdraw to N'délé. During clashes a few people were killed and injured on both sides, two government vehicles were destroyed and two Russians and one soldier were captured by rebels. During clashes in Gounda two Russians and four soldiers were killed a dozen others wounded. Rebel general was wounded while trying to apprehend wounded Russian fighter.
- 28 January: Government forces took control of Gounda, Gordil and Ndah after clashing with rebels. Dozens people were killed including seven Russian mercenaries.

=== February ===
- 7 February: Two soldiers were killed and three injured in mine explosion on Ndim-Kowone axis.
- 8 February: CPC rebels invaded Banguéla village on Bakala–Bambari axis, robbing local population before withdrawing to bush.
- 10 February: Six people including two priests were injured in mine explosion in the Ouham-Péndé prefecture.
- 14 February: CPC rebels recaptured Ndah, killing 16 soldiers and capturing 24. One rebel was killed and four injured. Captured soldiers were eventually released in early April.
- 17 February: After withdrawing from Gordil, government forces bombed the town with helicopters causing most civilian population and rebels to leave.
- 23 February: Pro-government forces were redeployed in Sikikédé.
- 25 February: A soldier was killed and a few Russians were injured in mine explosion in Ouham-Pende region.
- 27 November: Two Russian mercenaries were killed and two soldiers injured by CPC rebels near Yenga village in Nana-Mambéré prefecture.

=== March ===
- 4 March: Rebels attacked a truck near Nana-Bakassa injuring a few people.
- 8 March: Three workers kidnapped by PRNC rebels in November 2022 were fred.
- 13 March: Three Chinese national were kidnapped by armed men near Abba in Nana-Mambéré prefecture. They were eventually released in early April.
- 15 March:
  - Self-defense militia captured Bambouti after clashing with UPC rebels during which one rebel general was killed. Seven people were killed in total during the clashes.
  - Three civilians were killed and at least three wounded as a result of rebel attack on Wawa village in Ouaka. Attack was repelled.
- 16 March: Cardinal Dieudonné Nzapalainga was kidnapped by alleged PRNC rebels near Ouadda.
- 19 March: Gunmen attacked Chimbolo mining site near Bambari killing nine Chinese nationals. CPC rebels denied responsibility.
- 22 March: CPC rebels invaded Mala village in Kemo, attacking and kidnapping people before withdrawing later that day.
- 23 March: Four soldiers were killed in attack by FPRC and MPC rebels on Markounda. The same day one soldier was killed in CPC attack near Bozoum.
- 29 March: Two soldiers were killed and three Russian mercenaries were injured in rebel ambush near Gallo.
- 30 March:
  - Rebels launched attack on Russian base in Niem, two Russians were killed.
  - Azande self-defense militia repelled UPC attack on Bambouti. Several people were killed on both sides.

=== April ===
- 4 April: Armed forces repelled rebel attack on Bossemptélé. Two soldiers and one Russian were injured.
- 5 April: Azande self-defense group launched attack on base of armed forces in Obo freeing two prisoners.
- 7 April: Three soldiers were killed in an ambush by armed men near Boda
- 16 April: Five soldiers were killed in a rebel attack near Sikikédé.
- 19 April: Three Russian mercenaries and one soldier were killed by a landmine explosion near Koui.
- 23 April: Azande self-defense group repelled attack by South Sudanese militia on Bambouti with killed and injured on both sides.
- 26 April: Armed forces attacked CPC position in Bakouma. Two rebels and two civilians were killed. They withdrew a few hours later allowing rebel to return.
- 28 April: Soldier was shot dead by unidentified armen men near Kouki in Ouham.

=== May ===
- 5 May: CPC took control of Tiringoulou. Two soldiers were killed, two captured and one injured. They retreated two days later allowing government forces to regain the town.
- 7 May: Heavy clashes erupted 10 km from Mboki between UPC and Azande armed groups. Azande militiamen were eventually forced to retreat from the town by MINUSCA peacekeepers. At least 19 Azande militiamen were killed as well as some peacekeepers.
- 14 May: Chadian forces launched operation against Chadian rebels north of Paoua in the Central African Republic allegedly destroying two bases, killing 12 and arresting 30.
- 15 May: Four FACA soldiers were killed in rebel ambush near Bossangoa.
- 17 May: Azande militiamen looted building of NGO in Obo.
- 23 May: UPC rebels recaptured Kadjema near Mboki, two civilians and one Azande militant were killed.
- 24 May:
  - Two people were killed and newborn child injured by armed mean near Obo.
  - DRC soldiers crossed border with C.A.R. to attack Anti-balaka base near Kouango. Several people were killed and many wounded.
- 26 May: Heavy clashes erupted between CPC rebels and local self-defense forces in Sikikédé. 10 rebels and two civilians were killed, four people were injured, rebels retreated from the village.
- 30 May: Armed forces repelled CPC attack on Kabo with multiple people killed and wounded.

=== June ===
- 5 June: CPC rebels attacked base in Baoro, killing four Russians and injuring five.
- 8 June: Four soldiers were killed and seven injured in CPC attack on patrol in Bodjomo village near Markounda. Russians ambushed rebels capturing one of them.
- 11 June: One rebel was killed and four injured in Russian ambush in Bongou 55 km north of Bria. Clashes continued the next day with rebels claiming to have killed 10 pro-government fighters and government claiming PRNC chief of staff Mohamed Ali was killed.
- 13 June: 3R rebels attacked Makoundji Ouali village near Bocaranga. Three members of security forces were captured.
- 17 June: Russians again entered Nzacko, with rebels withdrawing shortly before.
- 20 June: Azande militiamen again launched attack on Mboki town, attack was repelled by UPC rebels. Reportedly at least 40 fighters were killed on both sides as well as four civilians.
- 23 June: Russian mercenaries clashed with CPC rebels in Zere village near Bossangoa. Four vehicles of Russians were burned.

=== July ===
- 3 July: Four soldiers and one civilian were killed and one civilian injured in CPC attack on Gobolo near Abba.
- 4 July: PRNC attacked Sam Ouandja. Six people were killed, including the gendarmerie brigade commander, two gendarmerie personnel, two teenagers, and one rebel.
- 6 July: Fighters were killed and injured and one UPC rebel captured after clashes between UPC and self-defense militia in Dembia village.
- 10 July: Rwandan peacekeepers conducted an operation against PRNC rebels outside the Sam Ouandja town. Three rebels (including general Bin Laden) were killed and one captured and one peacekeeper was killed.
- 12 July: Two soldiers were killed and one injured in rebel attack on Liré village near Bossangoa.
- 24 July: CPC rebels occupied Nana-Bakassa after brief battle with armed forces before retreating a few hours later. Three rebels were killed and two injured.

=== August ===
- 1 August: Armed men attacked Tiri village near N'dele killing 13 people including mayor.
- 5 August: pro-government forces attacked UPC position in Grignanda village on Bokolobo-Chimbolo axis. Three soldiers and four Black Russians were killed.
- 6–7 August: At least eight people were killed due to clashes between UPC and Azande AKG in Haute-Mbomou.
- 13 August: Following kidnapping of Muslim civilian by Azande militiaman, the latest clashed with soldiers leaving one Azande fighter injured.
- 25 August: Armed forces attacked UPC position in Goya village forcing rebels to withdraw. Deaths were reported on both sides.
- 25–6 August: Unidentified armed men launched attack at Yawa village near Boda.
- 29 August: Azande AKG militia launched attack on Mboki with killed on both sides.
- 31 August: Azande AKG militia killed several people on Mboki–Zemio road.

=== September ===
- 7 September: CPC rebels attacked Zamasinda village in Bamingui-Bangoran injuring one soldier.
- 10 September: Three Russian mercenaries were killed in a clash with 3R rebels near Nguia-Bouar.
- 11 September: One soldier was killed in rebel attack on Miamere village in Bamingui-Bangoran.
- 18 September: Armed forces repelled 3R attack on Beloko. One civilian was injured.
- 21 September: Three soldiers were killed in rebel attack on Zombossinda in Bamingui-Bangoran.
- 24 September: 3R rebels launched attack on Besson forcing soldiers to withdraw.

=== October ===
- 1 October: Two Catholic priests were robbed by Anti-balaka militiamen on Baoro–Bozoum axis. Day before another group of people was robbed and assaulted near Bozoum.
- 1–6 October: Armed men occupied Kratoma and Kpata villages in Bamingui-Bangoran committing acts of looting, property destruction and sexual violence.
- 7 October: 3R rebels attacked Anti-balaka militiamen in Bata village killing six of them and freeing 10 hostages.
- 12 October: 3R rebels attacked army position in Bézèrè near Bocaranga killing three soldiers.
- 18 October: One soldier was killed and two wounded in rebel ambush 25 km from Nana-Bakassa.
- 20 October: UPC seized Mbo village from the government forces. Later the government recaptured it.
- 21 October: CPC rebels attacked FACA position between Miamani and Tiri, capturing weapons.
- c. 22 October: Village chief and his son were murdered by alleged PRNC rebels outside of Ouadda.
- 22 October: Wagner Group attacked mining sites near Kouki and Markounda killing four rebels (including MPC general Adjadj) and 12 civilians.

=== November ===
- 2 November: CPC rebels attacked Moyenne-Sido seizing the town before withdrawing later that day. Five people were killed and eight injured.
- 7 November: Two people including two gendarmes and a woman were killed by armed men on Baoro-Carnot axis.
- 18 November: Four Chinese citizens were kidnapped by armed men in Abba subprefecture.
- 24 November: CPC rebels took control of Moyenne-Sido and attacked nearby village of Mboh. Armed forces recaptured Sido four days later.
- 30 November: 3R rebels attacked Ndim and Létélé killing two civilians and injuring a soldier.

=== December ===
- 7 December: FACA and Wagner Group launched an attack against UPC armed elements at the Bara mining site, in which 12 UPC fighters were reportedly killed and 30 apprehended. General Khalité, Mahamat Al-Khatim’s father-in-law, was among those killed. The attack took place while the Government of the Central African Republic was in negotiations for a peaceful settlement with Al-Khatim of MPC.
- 10 December: From 2.45 a.m. to 3 a.m., six waves of explosions were heard at the Wagner Group base in Kaga Bandoro, Nana-Grébizi Prefecture. Seven people were injured and three Russian merceneries were killed.
- 21 December: FACA clashed with 3R rebels in Nzakoundou, Ouham-Pendé. One soldier and 15 civilians were killed.

== 2024 ==
=== January ===
- 8 January:
  - UPC rebels attacked the FACA base in Kabo. Several soldiers and a civilian were killed.
  - Russian mercenaries captured Kéngué village near Mingala following heavy clash with CPC rebels.
- 10 January: CPC rebels attacked army base in Tiri forcing soldiers to retreat.
- 15 January: CPC rebels attacked army base in Boungou near Bria.
- 31 January: PRNC rebels from Ndiffa attacked a FACA checkpoint 5 km from Gordil in Manou and briefly occupied it before the army's reinforcements arrived. One FACA soldier was killed.

=== February ===
- 2 February: Military High Command announced the death of Mohamed Ali, alias B13, leader of the PRNC armed movement, active in the region, he died as a result of injuries sustained in a previous attack.
- 9–10 February: FACA and Wagner clashed with the rebels in Aba mining site near Beloko. One FACA soldier was killed, and one Wagner mercenary was injured.
- 11 February: Two soldiers were killed in CPC attack on a village near Amada-Gaza.
- 24 February: Armed forces conducted armed operation against armed groups in Miamani, Chari and Diki villages in Bamingui-Bangoran.

=== March ===
- 6 March: 10 civilians were kidnapped by armed men near Yaloke.
- 7 March: Armed rebels attacked .
- 8 March:The Central African Armed Forces (FACA) and their Russian allies have regained control of the town of Sikikédé, also called Ndah, from the rebels of the Coalition of Patriots for Change (CPC).The clash resulted in the death of 5 Faca soldiers with 2 injured and about 40 rebels were killed.

=== April ===
- 2 April: At least 18 civilians were killed by 3R rebels near Kella-Maoulé village in Nana-Mambéré province.
- 7 April: Wagner attacked Joseph Kony's hideout 10 miles from Yemen. They torched the villages and arrested the village chief. Two civilians and two Wagner militias were killed. Nevertheless, Wagner failed to capture Kony as he and his 71 men fled towards Sudan.
- 13 April: UPC killed three civilians in Tabane, Haut-Mbomou.
- 14 April:
  - Three soldiers and Russian mercenaries were killed in 3R ambush outside of Bocaranga.
  - CPC attacked Kologbota near Bakouma. They killed 14 people and burned six houses.
- 15 April: CPC stormed FACA position in Kadjama. Two soldiers and one civilian were killed.

=== May ===
- 6 May: Six civilians were killed and many houses burned after 3R rebels attacked the Gazi-Beya village.
- 12 May – At least four people are killed in an attack by the Coalition of Patriots for Change in the gold-mining town of Gaga, Ombella-M'Poko.
- 22 May: 12 men were killed by unidentified armed men near Kaga-Bandoro.
- 24 May -
  - An unknown armed group attacked FACA convoy in Tedoa, Nana-Mambéré.
  - FACA and Wagner launched military operation against CPC rebels in Bondodi-Bodjomo axis.
- 25 May - Azande Ani Kpi Gbe and Wagner launched a military offensive to defeat UPC rebels in Mboki, Zemio, and Djemah. A clash was reported in Mboki.
- 27 May - FACA and their Russian allies have successfully captured town of Mboki, Zemio and Djemah from UPC rebels. A clash between UPC rebels and FACA occurred in Kitésssa village near the town of Zemio, which resulted in Four rebels killed and another three injured.

=== June ===
- 1 June - CPC rebels attacked the FACA position in Nzacko. The government forces managed to repel the attack and killed 12 rebels.
- 5 June – FACA and MINUSCA have successfully recaptured the village of Mouka and the town of Ouadda from rebels.
- 15 June – Three UPC rebels were killed while trying to surrender by Azande militiamen in Zemio.
- 19 – 23 June – Wagner launched military operations against CPC rebels in Goya, Yako, and Bambari in Ouaka.
- 19 June - Azande Ani Kpi Gbe clashed with UPC in Banangui, killing one Azande militia.
- 22 June – CPC attacked a mining site near Bossangoa and killed 5 civilians, including 4 Burkinabè.
- 28 June - UPC rebels attacked FACA position in Goya village, resulting in 7 rebels and one FACA soldier killed.

=== July ===
- 2 July - An unknown armed group stormed FACA position in Ngoutéré. Five soldiers were killed and two were taken hostage. Two days leter rebels killed a soldier near Ngoutéré.
- 8 July: Two Chinese nationals were kidnapped by armed men near Beloko.
- 17 July: Three civilians were murdered by alleged PRNC rebels on Ouadda–Ouanda Djalle axis.
- 19 July: About 250 CPC rebels surrendered to the FACA in Korompoko in Ouham.
- 20 July: Armed forces clashed with UPC rebels in Zangba. Before withdrawing UPC rebels looted the property of local residents.
- 22 July: José Befio, leader of Anti-balaka in Ouham was killed together with his lieutant in Bouca by armed forces and their Russian allies.
- 25 July: 3R rebels attacked Russian position in Sagna mine near Bozoum.

=== August ===
- 2 August: 3R rebels killed two FACA soldiers in an ambush near Amada-Gaza.
- 4 August: Armed forces captured Pombolo killing one UPC rebel and capturing two.
- 8 August: CPC fighters 8 Aug killed five traders in ambush in Gambo sub-prefecture, Mbomou prefecture.
- 13 August: 3R rebels killed two Russian paramilitaries in ambush near mining site in Markounda sub-prefecture, Ouham prefecture.
- 19 August: UPC carried out ambush against Azande Ani Kpi Gbe near Guinikoumba, killing four AAKG militia.

=== September ===
- 4-5 September: FACA and Wagner launched an unsuccessful attack against CPC in Roquette mining site, near Markounda. The attack caused to the death of 5 rebels, two Wagner members, and a FACA soldier.
- 11 September: 3R rebels stormed the FACA position Ngoutéré, killing four soldiers. The attackers retreated when Wagner arrived in the village a few hours after the attack.
- 30 September: A soldiers was killed in rebel ambush near Ouandja-Djalle.

=== October ===
- 6 October: Alleged AAKG militias killed around 20 civilians in Dembia.
- 8 October: CPC rebels launched unsuccessful attack against position in Ngarba, Bamingui-Bangoran. During the attack, the rebels looted shops and houses. One soldier and three civilians were killed.
- 9 October: A clash between FACA and UPC took place in Fadama, 3 KM from Bakouma. FACA killed two rebels and several of them injured.
- 31 October: 3R rebels carried out ambush against FACA convoy who escorted a Chinese citizen near Alim. Two FACA soldiers were killed and the rebels took hostage of the vehicle occupants, including a Chinese citizen.

=== November ===
- 6 November: UPC rebels attacked FACA checkpoint in Yangouhoda near Nzacko. One soldier was killed.
- 8 November: Wagner and FACA launched a military operation against 3R rebels in Ngaoukala.
- 10 November:
  - An unidentified armed group carried out an ambush against two police officers in Maloum during a patrol. One police officer was killed while the other missing.
  - FACA clashed with Anti-balaka in Abba-Bogani. FACA soldiers fled and the Anti-balaka seized weapons and burned ten military motorcycles.
- 12 November: CPC-F rebels attacked FACA outpost near Ndembo. Two soldiers were reportedly killed and FACA retreated to the bush.
- 14 November: UPC rebels ambushed Wagner and its allies near Gbenga, killing one soldier.
- 18 November: UPC rebels occupied Serenga and Langangdji villages in Basse-Kotto abducting local authorities. Two days later MINUSCA peacekepeers reportedly repelled the attackers.
- 24 November: An alleged CPC rebels attacked FACA position in Boulo. Although the attack was repelled, a woman was injured and four houses were burned.
- 27 November: An armed group stormed FACA soldiers in Goboundo.

=== December ===
- 1 December: 3R rebels attacked FACA soldiers in Yadé near Koui.
- 4 December: CPC-F rebels ambushed FACA and Wagner soldiers near the village of May-mbaya.
- 25 December: 3R rebels attacked a mining site in Garo, Ouham-Pendé. Around 14 people were killed.

== 2025 ==
=== January ===
- 4 January: CPC-F stormed the FACA position in Zarami. Rebels attack prompted FACA soldiers to withdraw from the village.
- 8 January:
  - An unknown armed group attacked the FACA position in Bebenguéré.
  - A clash between FACA and CMSPR occurred in Benamkor.
- 15 January:
  - CPC ambushed Wagner near Bogali. The rebels claimed that they killed four Wagner.
  - An unknown group attacked Wagner Ndamiri at 11 am, causing the residents to flee their village.

=== February ===
- 3 February: CMSPR rebels attacked FACA position in Bodjomo, killing five soldiers.

=== March ===
- 9 March: Alleged 3R rebels burned Gbamboro and Yahoo in Ouham-Pendé.
- 24 March: Alleged CPC rebels attacked a mining site in Kéyé, Vakaga.
- 29 March: An unknown armed group launched an ambush against MINUSCA patrols in Tabane, Haut-Mbomou. The armed group killed a MINUSCA peacekeeper from Kenya.

=== April ===
- 14-15 April: An Alleged 3R group attacked Bang. FACA soldiers stationed in the town managed to repel the attack.
- 30 April: A clash between FACA-Wagner and Azande Ani Kpi Gbe ensued in Koumboli after attempting to disarm Azande militias, injuring two and killing four soldiers.

=== May ===
- 6 May: Azande Ani Kpi Gbe captured Mboki from FACA after a brief clash. The attack prompted hundreds of town residents to flee to MINUSCA camp.
- 9 May: Azande Ani Kpi Gbe ambushed FACA-Wagner forces in Koumboli.
- 14 May: An unknown armed group attacked FACA positions in Ouadda.

=== June ===
- 17 June: Internal fighting within the 3R rebels occurred in Dan-Gbabiri, Ouham-Pende.
- 20 June: An unknown armed group attacked the Zambian contingent of MINUSCA near Birao, wounding two soldiers. Later, one of the wounded soldiers died.

=== July ===
- 28 July: Azande Ani Kpi Gbe militia ambush Wagner patrols near Barre.

=== August ===
- 2 August: Alleged 3R rebels attacked FACA soldiers in Bodoro, Ouham.
- 21 August: 3R rebels attacked Kémo-Bac and killed two people.

=== September ===
- 5 September: FACA and Wagner attacked PRNC rebels 10 KM from Ouanda Djalle.

=== October ===
- 12 October: FACA and Wagner stormed the LRA camp near Sam Ouandja, killing nine militias and seizing a cache of weapons.

=== November ===
- 1 November: CPC-Fundamental attacked the Birao Self-Defense group, and Wagner forces 90 KM from Birao. CPC claimed that they killed three Wagner members.

=== December ===
- 1 December: FACA and Wagner launched an operation against UPC, CPC-F, and FPRC in the Aouk area.
- 15 December: An alleged Azande Ani Kpi Gbe militia attacked MINUSCA forces 20 km from Zemio, wounding two troops.
- 27 December: Government and Russian forces launched an offensive against rebel positions at Tissi in Vakaga. According to opposition source two Russian mercenaries, two Boromata militiamen, two FPRC rebels, and thirty-two civilians were killed were killed during the operation, though authorities deny this.
- 28 December: An alleged Azande Ani Kpi Gbe militia attacked the FACA position in Bambouti.

== 2026 ==
=== January ===
- 1 January:
  - FACA and Wagner recaptured Bambouti from Azande Ani Kpi Gbe (AAKG).
  - AAKG attacked the FACA checkpoint in Bandachi near Zemio.
- 21-22 January: Wagner stormed the alleged PRNC base near Sam Ouandja.

=== February ===
- 3 January: AAKG attacked FACA troops in Dembia, capturing four.

=== March ===
- 10 March: AAKG ambushed FACA and Wagner patrols near Mboki and around Obo.

=== April ===
- 10 April: AAKG attacked FACA and Wagner convoy on the Zemio-Dembia axis and two AAKG members were captured.

=== May ===
- 27 May: Alleged CPC rebels attacked FACA soldiers and killed one near Bouca.

=== June ===
- 30 June: ASP rebels captured Am Dafok.

=== July ===
- 5 July: FACA and Wagner seized Am Dafok from rebels.

=== November ===
- 5 November: FACA and Russian forces launch an operation against an Anti-balaka group at the south of Pendéré, killing nine militants, including a field commander Marcel Ndalé and his brother Adouma.
