= Central African Republic–China relations =

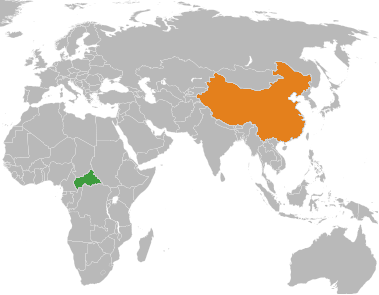
- Central African Republic: China

Central African Republic–China refer to the bilateral relations of the Central African Republic and the People's Republic of China. Diplomatic relations between China and the Central African Republic were established on September 29, 1964, when the CAR's government severed diplomatic relations with the Republic of China (Taiwan). The Central African Republic has an embassy in Beijing whilst China has an embassy in Bangui.

== History ==
David Dacko established diplomatic relations with Beijing on 29 September 1964, thereby cutting off relations with the Government of the Republic of China in Taiwan. It is believed that France tacitly supported the 1966 coup by Jean-Bédel Bokassa because of Dacko's rapprochement to China.

Following establishment of relations in 1964, when Bokassa came to power in 1966, he immediately switched the nation's recognition back to Taiwan and severed diplomatic ties with the government in Beijing, "accusing Chinese Communists of conspiring against his nation's interests". However, he again normalized relations with the People's Republic and visited Beijing in 1976. The Central African Republic switched its recognition back to the Taiwan in 1991 under President André-Dieudonné Kolingba. Kolingba's successor, Ange-Félix Patassé, would switch the CAR's recognition back to the People's Republic of China in 1998, which remained the status quo in the following decades. Since 1998, China has delivered much foreign aid to the CAR, including doctors and civil engineers. Trade between China and the CAR has increased in the 2000s, and CAR President François Bozizé called for more Chinese investment in the country in 2009.

The Chinese embassy in Bangui temporarily suspended its operations in 2013 after the fall of President Bozizé and the subsequent civil war, but as of 2016 it was reopened.

The Central African Republic was one of 53 countries that backed the Hong Kong national security law at the United Nations in June 2020. The Central African Republic follows the one China principle. It is among the countries which recognizes the People's Republic of China as the sole government of China and Taiwan as an integral part of China's territory, and supports all efforts by the PRC to "achieve national reunification". The Central African Republic considers Hong Kong, Xinjiang and Tibet to be China's internal affairs.

A Confucius Institute was inaugurated in Bangui in April 2023.

== Economic relations ==
China is active in gold mining in the CAR. Over the years, multiple killings have occurred in or around Chinese-run mines. Two Chinese nationals were killed by residents who attacked a Chinese-operated mine in Sosso-Nakombo in 2020. On 19 March 2023, the Chimbolo massacre took place, killing 9 Chinese workers at a gold mine. China stated it didn't know for certain who was responsible for the killings. Shortly after the massacre, China repatriated 80 nationals. In July 2023, Wagner Group fighters reportedly came to the rescue of another group of Chinese miners under attack from militias near Dimbi. In May 2024, four workers were killed by rebels who attacked the Chinese-run gold mining town of Gaga.

In June 2024, Central African authorities revoked the Chinese mining company Daqing SARL's license to carry out activities in Mingala over alleged collusion with rebel groups. Daqing was accused of "[sharing] intelligence with armed groups, illegal exploitation, illegal introduction of foreign subjects into mining areas, non-payment of taxes and lack of activity reports".

The Central African Republic joined the Belt and Road Initiative (BRI) in 2021.

=== Economic aid ===
Since the first Forum on China Africa Cooperation in 2000, the Chinese government has delivered $152 million in development assistance to the Central Africa Republic. Several major Chinese aid projects in the Central African Republic include:

- A $67.4 million loan from the Exim Bank of China to install fix and mobile networks in the country.
- Construction of the 20,000-seat Barthélemy Boganda Stadium in Bangui financed by the Chinese government, carried out between 2003 and 2007.
- The cancellation of $11.4 million in debt owed to China.
- Construction of the Sakaï Solar Power Plant, located 10 kilometers from Bangui, with Chinese financial and technical aid. The plant is intended to deal with the widespread power cuts in the CAR. It became operational in April 2023 after three years of construction.
- Construction of a 68.84-kilometer highway from Bossarangba to Mbaïki by PowerChina, starting in 2023.

== Military aid ==
Chinese instructors have trained members of the Central African Republic's internal security forces, such as police and presidential guard, in 2018.

== See also ==
- Foreign relations of the Central African Republic
- Foreign relations of China
