= Silambi =

- Location in Central African Republic
- Coordinates: 7°58′17″N 17°41′11″E
- Country: Central African Republic
- Prefecture: Ouham
- Sub-prefecture: Markounda
- Commune: Nana Markounda

Silambi is a village located near Central African Republic–Chad border in Ouham Prefecture, Central African Republic.

== History ==
ANT soldiers allied with Peuhl Herders stormed Silambi on 29 February 2008, killing one person, burning 200 houses, and looting civilian belongings. The 2008 February attack prompted the 100 villagers to flee the village. In October 2016, the village had a base for RJ and a base for FPRC.

A clash between RJ and MPC ensued in Silambi on 22 March 2018. In March 2023, the village was under government control.

== Education ==
Silambi has one school. The school was burned during the 2008 February attack.
