= Mainodjo =

- Location in Central African Republic
- Coordinates: 7°51′3″N 17°28′47″E
- Country: Central African Republic
- Prefecture: Ouham
- Sub-prefecture: Markounda
- Commune: Nana Markounda

Mainodjo is a village situated in Ouham Prefecture, Central African Republic.

== History ==
At the end of 2006, a clash between rebels and government forces ensued near Mainodjo, leading the villagers to seek refuge in Chad. ANT raided the village in the early 2008.

RJ was reportedly established a base in Mainodjo in March 2019. As of April 2024, FACA controlled the village.

== Healthcare ==
The village has one health post. MSF used to manage the post until they closed it in August 2011.
