= Bongboto massacre =

2021 massacre in Ouham, Central African Republic

Coordinates: 6.60170°N 17.43574°E

- Part of Central African Republic Civil War
- Location: Bongboto, Ouham, Central African Republic
- Date: 21 July 2021
- Attack type: Massacre
- Weapon: Firearms
- Deaths: 13 killed
- Perpetrator: Disputed
- No. of participants: 4–6

On 21 July 2021, 13 unarmed civilians were murdered in Bongboto village near Bossangoa in the Central African Republic. Government forces and rebels from Coalition of Patriots for Change have blamed each other for the massacre. Investigation done by Human Rights Watch has identified Russian mercenaries from the Wagner Group as responsible for the massacre, while the results of an investigation launched by the government have not been published.

== Timeline of events according to Human Rights Watch ==
On 21 July shortly after 6 a.m. a group of 19 young men riding on six motorbikes left Bossangoa heading north. They then crossed through a permanent Central African military checkpoint north of Bossangoa. Two or three motorbike drivers were allowed to either pass through the checkpoint or return to Bossangoa, while three or four of them were stopped by soldiers. One witness said that between 6 and 7 a.m. he saw a number of military vehicles passing the location including a pickup land cruiser, a national army land cruiser, and a gendarmerie pickup truck. Then he saw four motorcycles with white men pass the spot. According to sources Russian mercenaries were conducting patrols in the area with gendarmes.

According to witness testimony between four and six men on four motorcycles were blocking the road 12 km north of Bossangoa. They were wearing beige khaki clothes, scarves covering their faces, military boots, gloves, and sunglasses. They pointed weapons at travelers signaling with their hands to stop, which the group did a few meters away from the roadblock. Then the Russian men forced them to get off motorcycles and place their hands on their heads. The Russians took their phones, money and searched their bags. The men encircled the group and started beating and kicking them while they were laying on the ground. Then two of the Russian-speaking men pulled up members of the group one by one and shot them in the head. Two people managed to escape.

One witness said that he saw 11 bodies including eight or nine in a shallow pit near the road and two or three nearby. Another witness said that all of the people had been shot in the head. Human Rights Watch claims that they managed to obtain four photos from the massacre. One shows a pile of seven bodies near the road with some having gunshot wounds to the head. Two photos show eight corpses in a vehicle. According to the prefect of Bossangoa, authorities recovered 13 bodies. Three corpses were taken directly from the scene of the crime, while the remaining 10 were taken to the Bossangoa hospital, where relatives picked them up before doctors could examine them.

== Reactions and aftermath ==
UN peacekeeping mission, MINUSCA, sent a joint patrol of UNPOL and MINUSCA Forces to the area to investigate the killings. Two witnesses said that they saw multiple vehicles arrive in the area including police, gendarmerie, MINUSCA, UNPOL as well as the prefect. Other person said that they saw MINUSCA soldiers picking up bullet casings near the bodies.

According to prefect of Bossangoa and minister of communication massacre has been committed by the rebels from Coalition of Patriots for Change. Government has created a Special Commission to investigate the massacre however as of May 2022 it has not published any findings. According to opposition party Kwa Na Kwa and CorbeauNews massacre has been committed by Russian mercenaries from the Wagner Group. Coalition of Patriots for Change has officially released statement denying responsibility for the massacre and blaming Russian mercenaries. Investigation conducted by Human Rights Watch which involved interviewing 12 people, 10 by phone and two in person also blamed Russian mercenaries. The findings of this investigation were published in May 2022.
