= Benzambe =

- Location in Central African Republic
- Coordinates: 6°47′22″N 17°38′18″E
- Country: Central African Republic
- Prefecture: Ouham
- Sub-prefecture: Bossangoa
- Commune: Ben Zambé

Population (2013)
  - Total: 4,500

Benzambe is a village located in the Central African Republic prefecture of Ouham northwest of Bossangoa.

== History ==
In September 2013 Benzambe was captured by Anti-balaka fighters supported by former president François Bozizé. On 25 February 2021 Benzambe was recaptured by government forces during their offensive against rebels from Coalition of Patriots for Change. On 16 October seven people were killed by Russian mercenaries in Benzambe.
