= Dokabi =

- Location in Central African Republic
- Coordinates: 7°44′3″N 17°14′28″E
- Country: Central African Republic
- Prefecture: Ouham
- Sub-prefecture: Markounda
- Commune: Nana Markounda

Dokabi is a village situated in Ouham Prefecture, Central African Republic.

== History ==
An armed militia looted and burned Dokabi on 14 December 2005. In mid-February 2008, ANT attacked Dokabi.

In 2014, ANT soldiers dressed in MISCA uniforms launched attacks in Dokabi. On 12 March 2014, an armed group from Chad pillaged and burned the village. FPRC controlled and had a base in the village in 2018.

== Healthcare ==
Dokabi has one health post.

== Bibliography ==
- UN Security Council (21 December 2015). Letter dated 21 December 2015 from the Panel of Experts on the Central African Republic extended pursuant to Security Council resolution 2196 (2015) addressed to the President of the Security Council (PDF) (Report).
