= Bouansouma =

- Location in Central African Republic
- Coordinates: 6°47′25″N 17°38′19″E
- Country: Central African Republic
- Prefecture: Ouham
- Sub-prefecture: Bossangoa
- Commune: Benzambé

Bouansouma is a village situated in Ouham Prefecture, Central African Republic. The village serves as the capital of Benzambé Commune.

== History ==
On 14 November 1959, Bouansouma was designated as the capital of the Benzambé commune. An alleged Seleka militia attacked Bouansouma on 22 September 2013 and burned around 280 houses. In October 2021, the villagers returned to Bouansouma.

== Education ==
There is a school in the village.

== Healthcare ==
Bouansouma has one health center.
