= Bossangoa Airport =

- IATA: BSN; ICAO: FEFS

Summary
- Airport type: Public
- Serves: Bossangoa, Central African Republic
- Elevation AMSL: 1,526 ft / 465 m
- Coordinates: 6°29′35″N 17°25′40″E

Map
- Location of Bossangoa Airport in the Central African Republic

Runways
Direction	Length		Surface
Direction	m	ft	Surface
12/30	1,814	5,951	Grass
- Source: Landings.com Google Maps GCM

Bossangoa Airport (IATA: BSN, ICAO: FEFS) is an airport serving Bossangoa, a city in the Ouham prefecture of the Central African Republic. The airport is on the west side of the city.

== See also ==
- Transport in the Central African Republic
- List of airports in the Central African Republic
