= Boguila =

- Location in Central African Republic
- Coordinates: 5°53′0″N 16°32′0″E
- Country: Central African Republic
- Prefecture: Ouham-Pendé
- Sub-prefecture: Bossemptélé
- Commune: Binon

Boguila is a village located in the Central African Republic prefecture of Ouham-Pendé. It should not be confused with the town of Boguila in Ouham prefecture.

According to Medecins Sans Frontieres,

Since the coup d’état in March 2013, Boguila has been unstable with increasing tensions and violence. In August 2013, a peak of violence provoked a massive population displacement in the area. In December 2013, Muslims fleeing violence from Nana Bakassa sought refuge with host families in Boguila before moving further north.

Between January and October 2013, approximately 95,000 people in the areas surrounding the town received treatment for malaria.

On April 11, 2014, "nearly 7000 people fled to the bush after fighting erupted in Boguila." Chadian troops were escorting a convoy of "the last 540 Muslim residents of the northwestern town of Bossangoa to Goré, Chad," and were attacked by local militia as they passed through Boguila. On April 28, 2014, Medecins Sans Frontieres announced it would suspend its activities in Boguila, after "rebels affiliated with the Séléka group" opened fire in a hospital, "killing at least 16 people."
