= Kembé Falls =

Central African waterfall system

Coordinates: 4°38′8″N 21°55′5″E

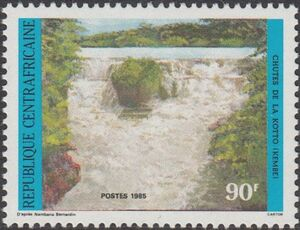
A 1985 Central African stamp depicting the Kotto Falls.

Kembé Falls (also known as the Kotto Falls) are located on the Kotto River, near Kembé on the road from Bangui to Bangassou in the Central African Republic, located about 80 km from Bangassou. Located some 3km from the town of Kembé, they are undeveloped and a regular stopping point for overland travelers.
