= Nana-Bakassa =

- sub-prefectures
- Location in Central African Republic
- Country: Central African Republic

Government
  - Sub-prefect: Edgard Marcien Namkona

Population (2014)
  - Total: 7,516

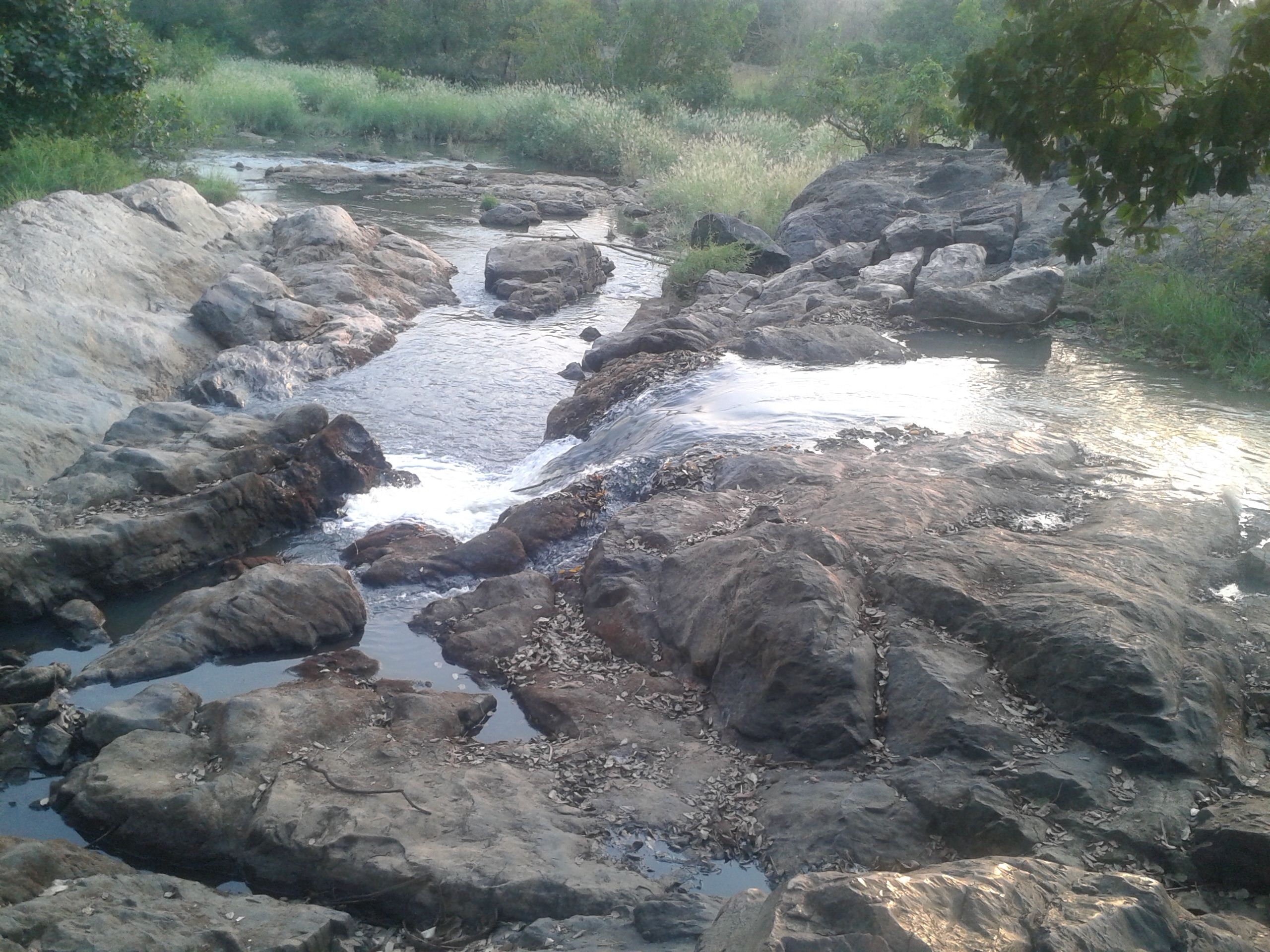
Nana Bakassa

Nana-Bakassa is a sub-prefecture of Ouham in the Central African Republic.

== Geography ==
The locality located on the left bank of the Nana Bakassa River, a tributary of Ouham, is crossed by the RN1 road connecting Bossangoa to the Chadian border. In 2014, the population of the locality is estimated at 7,516 inhabitants.

The commune of Nana-Bakassa is located in the center of the prefecture of Ouham, it is surrounded by 6 neighboring communes.

Most villages are located on the Bossangoa - Nana-Bakassa - Chad road, RN1 national road.

Communes bordering Nana-Bakassa
| | Nana-Markounda | |
| Nanga Boguila | | Bede |
| Ndoro-Mboli | Bossangoa | Benzambé |

== History ==
In 2002, Nana-Bakassa was erected in sub-prefecture, resulting from a division of the sub-prefecture of Bossangoa. On 25 June 2020 Nana-Bakassa was reportedly under control of MPC armed group. On 7 October it was captured by Return, Reclamation, Rehabilitation group. On 25 March 2021 it was reported that Nana-Bakassa was recaptured by government forces.

CPC attacked the FACA position in Nana-Bakassa on 24 July 2023. The clashes lasted for several hours and the rebels managed to occupy the town briefly before FACA recaptured it. Three insurgents were killed and two wounded. Due to the attack, some town residents fled to the bush and shops were closed.

== Administration ==
The sub-prefecture of Nana-Bakassa is made up of the single commune of the same name. With 46,247 inhabitants and 174 villages recorded in 2003, the commune is the most populated of the prefecture.

Villages on the Nana-Bakassa axis at Bossangoa: Bodoni, Tigueda, Bondiba, Zian, Bofile, Konkon, Goniyari, Bendoui, Ndali, Pembe Farm, Anafio 2, Dabili, Boali, Bozanga, Anafio, Zian-Boy, Ngawele, Botoro, Ngai-Gban, Bokoura, Bodolé, Bokongo, Bodoro-Gassa, Gonissang-Gassa, Boferan, Léré, Boko, Bokessé, Bonkone, Bende, Bokine, Bodouk, Bozele, Bokpata 1, Kete-Cbanou, Gazouene, Nonsi, Bomboimo, Bongboto, Douben, Zoro, Bogoro, Gbaton.

== Company ==
Since 1960, the locality is the seat of the Catholic parish Holy Thérèse of the Child Jesus Nana Bakassa, it depends on the diocese of Bossangoa. The commune is the seat of another Catholic parish whose seat is in the locality of Kouki, Saint Laurent de Kouki.

== Economy ==
In March 2013, after the closure of the Bossangoa factory, the industrial cotton crop gave way to subsistence crops.
