= Banangui =

- Location in Central African Republic
- Coordinates: 5°32′56″N 25°14′2″E
- Country: Central African Republic
- Prefecture: Haut-Mbomou
- Sub-prefecture: Zemio
- Commune: Zemio

Banangui, also spelled Banangi, is a village located in Haut-Mbomou Prefecture, Central African Republic.

== History ==
An armed group raided Banangui and looted civilian properties on 12 March 2017. On 17 May 2017, LRA militias attacked Banangui. They abducted 16 people and looted food from the village. Later, four men escaped and LRA released all women hostages. On 22 November 2018, a clash between Anti-balaka and UPC caused the villagers to flee Banangui and seek refuge in Dembia.

A clash between Azande Ani Kpi Gbe and UPC ensued in the village on 19 June 2024 and one AAKG militia was killed.

== Healthcare ==
Banangui has two health posts.

== Bibliography ==
- OCHA (18 December 2017a). Narrative Report (PDF) (Report).
