= Boyali =

- Location in Central African Republic
- Coordinates: 5°03′11″N 17°52′52″E
- Country: Central African Republic
- Prefecture: Ombella-M'Poko
- Sub-prefecture: Bossembélé

Boyali is a village located in the Central African Republic prefecture of Ombella-M'Poko on the road between Boali and Bossembélé.

== History ==
On 8 January 2014 Séléka withdrew from Boyali. Same day 200 Anti-balaka fighters enter the town killing local Muslims leading to return of Séléka forces which committed another massacre, burning 961 homes. On 22 December 2020 Boyali was captured by rebels from Coalition of Patriots for Change. Government forces recaptured it on 26 January 2021 killing 44 rebels.
