= Baoro =

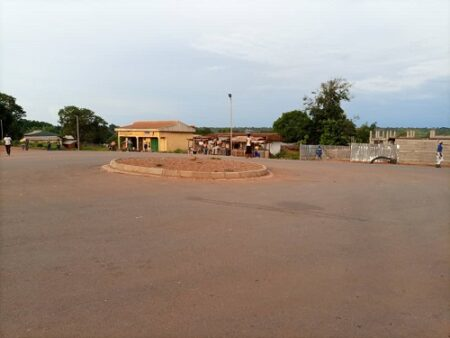

- Location in Central African Republic
- Coordinates: 5°41′N 15°57′E
- Country: Central African Republic
- Prefecture: Nana-Mambéré

Government
  - Sub-prefect: James Chantal Pokossi Gbapelet

Baoro is a town located in the Central African Republic prefecture of Nana-Mambéré.

== History ==
On 20 January 2014 Seleka withdrew from Baoro. Two days later armed Anti-balaka fighters attacked the town killing civilians. Muslims were able to repel the attack and in respinse started killing Christian civilians resulting in more than 100 deads. On 29 January Anti-balaka took control of the town after last Muslims left. In July 2017 Baoro was reportedly under control of security forces (gendarmerie). On 28 December 2020 rebels from CPC took control of the town. Government forces recuptured it on 8 February 2021.

CPC attacked the Wagner base in Baoro on 5 June 2023. The clash between the two belligerents lasted for three hours and it was reported that Wagner suffered ten casualties, four died and six wounded. Aftermath the attack, Wagner's forces conducted a search operation in the town and arrested a drunk person who was suspected of plotting against Wagner.
