= Beboura =

- Location in Central African Republic
- Coordinates: 7°20′28″N 16°37′37″E
- Country: Central African Republic
- Prefecture: Lim-Pendé
- Sub-prefecture: Paoua
- Commune: Nana–Barya

Beboura is a village located in the Central African Republic prefecture of Lim-Pendé on the road between Paoua and Nanga-Boguila.

== History ==
In late 2005 Beboura was captured by People's Army for the Restoration of Democracy (APRD) with 420 to 570 fighters being stationed there.

On 24 December 2013 rebel group Revolution and Justice attacked Beboura killing 45 Séléka fighters. As of June 2017 the town was reportedly under joint control of RJ and Central African Patriotic Movement (MPC). On 9 January 2020 MINUSCA forces withdrew from Beboura in Ouham Pende after a crowd destroyed their base following a road accident. It was subsequently captured by MPC on 25 June. As of March 2021 Beboura remains under rebel control.
