= Chimbolo massacre =

Central African Republic mass killing

Coordinates: 5.7188°N 20.8445°E

- Part of Central African Republic Civil War
- Location: Chimbolo, Ouaka, Central African Republic
- Date: 19 March 2023; 4:00 WAT (UTC+01:00)
- Attack type: Massacre
- Weapon: Firearms
- Deaths: 9 killed (excluding 1 attacker)
- Injuries: 2 injured
- Victim: Chinese workers
- Perpetrator: Disputed
- No. of participants: Unknown

On 19 March 2023 unknown gunmen attacked a gold mine near the town of Chimbolo in the Central African Republic's province of Ouaka, killing nine Chinese workers and injuring two.

== Background ==
In the early March 2023, miners started to work near the Chimbolo village in a gold mine owned by Chinese company The Gold Coast Group.

== Events ==
Around 5 a.m. local time (04:00 GMT) a group of armed men entered the site. More than a dozen soldiers were supposed to protect the site but only four were present during the attack. Upon seeing the attackers all guards fled, shooting one of the attackers in the process. After their retreat, attackers entered the dormitories and began taking their inhabitants one by one. They tackled them to the ground before executing them at point-blank range. Before turning back, attackers searched the dormitory and retrieved the body of one of their fighters who was killed previously.

The attackers left the bodies of the victims facing down in a row in the mud. The victims have not been identified, and their bodies were cremated shortly after the attack.

== Responsibility ==
=== Allegations of rebel responsibility ===
The government, including justice minister Arnaud Djoubaye Abazène, has blamed rebel Coalition of Patriots for Change for the attack. Yevgeny Prigozhin, head of the Wagner Group claimed the "bandits" were responsible for the attack and that they were caught without elaborating. According to investigation by Afrique Media rebels from UPC were responsible for the attack. On 19 April government released its investigation blaming the CPC rebels for the massacre.

=== Allegations of government responsibility ===
Rebels spokesman Mamadou Koura refuted these allegations and instead blamed Russian mercenaries from the Wagner Group. According to Corbeau News Centrafrique one of the attackers who was killed during the attack was named Saleh alias "Erike" who belonged to pro-government armed group. The website blamed the Wagner Group and allied Central African militia for the attack citing interview with one of the survivors of the attack. Investigation by Mother Jones blamed Russian mercenaries for the attack.

According to Human Rights Division of the United Nations ex-UPC combatants allied with the government known as "Black Russians" were present in the area during the attack. They allegedly beat a man to force him to reveal the identities of the attackers.
