= Gaga, Central African Republic =

Gaga
- Location in Central African Republic
- Coordinates: 5°29′30″N 16°58′42″E
- Country: Central African Republic
- Prefecture: Ombella-M'Poko
- Sub-prefecture: Yaloke
- Commune: Guézéli

Population (2015)
  - Total: 8,000

Gaga is a village located in the Central African Republic prefecture of Ombella-M'Poko. Artisanal gold mining is active in the commune.

== History ==
On 7 October 2013 Seleka fighters raided Gaga and began demanding money and shooting people who refused to pay. At least 17 people were killed and then their bodies thrown into wells. Many people fled the town. On 9 October Anti-balaka attacked Gaga killing four rebels and then started attacking Muslim civilians killing around 60 people. Six days later, on 13 October, Anti-balaka took control of Gaga.

According to November 2019 report there were at least 16 artisanal gold mining sites in the Gaga commune. Chinese company was reportedly involved in some of these sites.

On 30 August 2020 militias took control of Gaga after clashes with FACA soldiers. They ransacked buildings of Chinese companies operating in the area. Soldiers returned to the town on 2 September. On 15 December 2020 it was captured by Anti-balaka fighters. 32 Chinese workers fled the mine and were rescued by Bangladeshi peacekeepers. As of 25 February 2021 rebels were still present in the vicinity of Gaga.

In May 2024, four workers were killed by rebels who attacked the mining town. The rebels were reportedly linked to the Coalition of Patriots for Change.
