= Nanga-Boguila =

- sub-prefectures
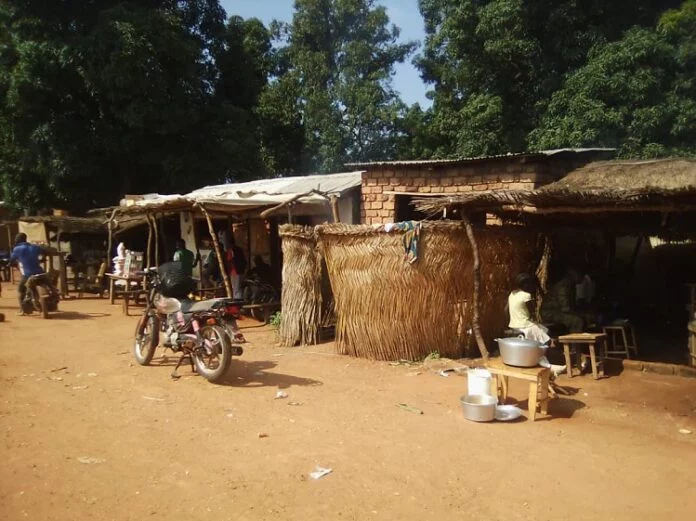
- Nanga-Boguila Market in 2019

- Location in Central African Republic
- Country: Central African Republic

Government
  - Sub-prefect: Arthur Beamkonam

Nanga-Boguila is a sub-prefecture of Ouham in the Central African Republic.

== Geography ==
The commune of Nanga Boguila is located in the north-west of the Ouham prefecture. It is crossed by the axis Nana-Bakassa - Boguila - Bongaro 1, national highway RN1.

Neighboring Communes of Nanga Boguila
Nana Barya	Nana-Markounda	
Bimbi		Nana Bakassa
Ouham-Bac	Ndoro-Mboli	

== Population ==
In 2003, the population was 23,982 people.

== History ==
Nanga Boguila is erected in sub-prefecture of Ouham since May 2, 2002 by division of southern part of the sub-prefecture of Markounda.

On 22 January 2014 Revolution and Justice rebel group attacked Boguila killing 22 Seleka fighters. On 25 June 2020 Central African Patriotic Movement rebel group reportedly moved to Nanga-Boguila. On 27 September 2020 Return, Reclamation, Rehabilitation established their presence there. Nanga-Boguila was recaptured by government forces on 18 February 2021.

== Villages ==
The main villages are: Bondaro, Boria, Boguila 1, Bogone 3, Boaya, Bomentana Center and Bowansen. The commune has 102 villages in rural areas identified in 2003: Arab 2, Bedin, Boaya, Bobaina, Boboro, Bodongue, Boferan, Bogama Kette, Bogama Kota, Bogassa, Bogodo, Bogomba, Bogomte Kette, Bogota Kota, Boguela, Boguila 1, Boguila 2, Boguila Kete, Boguila-Bedobo, Boguila-Gbogbol, Bohing, Bokarin, Bokote Kota 1, Bokote Kota 2, Bokote-Alato, Bokote-Kette, Bokote-Sesse, Bokparatong, Boleing Kette, Boling-Kota, Bomantana, Bomantanagbazoro, Bombaye-Kette, Bombaye-Kota, Bomber-Nouna, Bomentana-Biti, Bonanga, Bonasse 3, Bonasse Kota, Bonasse-Kette, Bondondi, Bondoro-Kette, Bondoro-Kota, Bongba Kette, Bongbara, Bongone 3, Bonoi 1, Bonoi 2, Bonte, Boria, Borok-Mo Kota, Borosse, Borro 1, Bossara, Bossole, Botongo, Botoni, Bounana-Breeding, Boundia, Bowain, Bowansem, Bowara, Boyanga, Boyanga Kette, Boyanga Kota, Bozanzon, Bozera, Bozera -Kette, Bozera-Kota, Bozima, Bozinga, Bozoe, Bozona 1, Bozona 2, Medical Center, Dangsom, Daring, Dombang, Donfera, Gbadam, Gbakera, Gbangono, Gbanou, Gbaring, Gbassom, Gom-Okpa, Gompo, Kobana 2, Kobana 2, Mbombara-Kette, Mbombara-Kota, Nanga, Ndakta, Ngazomgue, Sagon, Samon, Sokodo 3, Sokodo-Kette, Sokodo-Kota, Teyengue, Togbissa, Zekewen.

== Education ==
The commune has 21 public schools: Sous-prefectorale of Boguila, Bolgue, Boyanga-Kota, Bobai-Kota, Nanga, Bondodi, Sokodo, Bombara-Kota, Bomentana, Bonasse-Kete, Bokote-Kete, Samon, Bokote-Kota 2, Bowing, Bomantana-Beti, Bogama-Kete, Botongo, Bouria, Gbounou, Bondaro and Bokote-Sesse.

== Political representation ==
The Sub-prefecture of Nanga-Boguila has been a legislative constituency since 2005.

Members of Nanga-Boguila
Election date	Identity	Left
2005	Maurice Saragba	independent
2011	Maurice Saragba	independent
2016	Franck-Urban Saragba	independent
