= Kembé =

- Location in Central African Republic
- Coordinates: 4°36′N 21°46′E
- Country: Central African Republic
- Prefecture: Basse-Kotto

Government
  - Sub-Prefect: Richard Nouidemona

Kembé is a town located in the Central African Republic prefecture of Basse-Kotto. The Kotto Falls double waterfall is nearby.

== History ==
In 1985, Kembé was electrified.

Kembé, together with nearby Dimbi, was captured by Séléka rebels on 20–21 January 2013. In November 2016 it was reported that Kembe was under control of rebels from Union for Peace in the Central African Republic. On 11 October 2017, 25 Muslim civilians were massacred by anti-balaka militiamen inside a mosque in the town of Kembe. As of June 2019 Kembe was under control of Anti-balaka. On 6 May 2021 the town was recaptured by government forces, however later it was captured by UPC rebels and as of April 2022 remains under UPC control.
