= Dimbi =

- Location in Central African Republic
- Coordinates: 4.6221°N 21.7256°E
- Country: Central African Republic
- Prefecture: Basse-Kotto
- Sub-prefecture: Kembé
- Commune: Kembé

Dimbi is a village located in the Central African Republic prefecture of Basse-Kotto.

== History ==
Dimbi was captured by Séléka rebels on 20–21 January 2013.

On 6 May 2021 Dimbi was recaptured by government forces after ousting Union for Peace in the Central African Republic armed group. On 8 October 2021 UPC rebels regained control of Dimbi. On 13 June 2022 armed forces supported by Russians captured Dimbi after clashing with rebels. On 3 July armed forces repelled rebel attack on Dimbi killing 12 rebels and capturing five.
