= National Movement for the Liberation of the Central African Republic =

- Mouvement national pour la libération de la Centrafrique
- Leader: Ahmat Bahar
- Dates active: 2017–2019
- Headquarters: Bémal
- Active regions: Northwestern part of Central African Republic
- Part of: MPC (since 2018)
- Wars: Central African Republic Civil War (2012–present)

National Movement for the Liberation of the Central African Republic (MNLC, French: Mouvement national pour la libération de la Centrafrique) was a rebel group in the Central African Republic based in northwestern part of country.

== History ==
In 2017, a new rebel group named MNLC was formed in Central African Republic. Media reports connect the new MNLC to outbursts of violence in the Central African Republic. NGO International Crisis Group reports that "clashes between armed groups National Movement for the Liberation of the Central African Republic (MNLC) and Revolution and Justice (RJ) intensified" in January 2018. In May 2018 its leader, Ahmat Bahar announced that group was merging with Central African Patriotic Movement. In October 2019 Ahamat Bahar was reportedly arrested in Goré in Chad after he fled Central African Republic two months before.
