= Revolution and Justice =

- Révolution et Justice
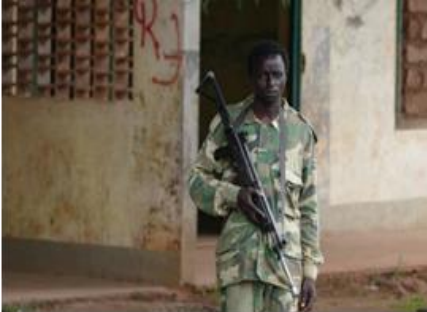
- RJ fighter in Paoua, 2016
- Leaders: Armel Mingatoloum-Sayo; Esther Audrienne Guetel-Moïba
- Dates active: 2013–2019
- Headquarters: Boloum (2013); Paoua (2014–2018)
- Active regions: Central African Republic: Ouham prefecture; Ouham-Pende prefecture
- Wars: Central African Republic Civil War (2012–present)

Revolution and Justice (RJ, French: Révolution et Justice) was an armed group based in northwestern part of the Central African Republic.

== History ==
Territories held by RJ in May 2017

On 1 November 2013 Revolution and Justice established training camp in Boloum near Paoua. On 24 December RJ attacked Beboura killing 45 Seleka fighters. On 22 January 2014 heavy clashes erupted in Boguila between RJ and Seleka leading to 22 Seleka fighters being killed. On 24 January RJ took control of Bojomo on Boguila-Markounda axis after killing 13 Seleka fighters. In January it took control of Paoua. In February RJ took control of Bang near Ngaoundaye. On 29 March RJ captured Bedaka north of Paoua after clashes with Séléka forces.

On 20 January 2018 heavy clashes broke out between RJ and MNLC north of Paoua forcing 60,000 people to seek refugee in city On 30 January RJ agreed to voluntarily dissolve itself, becoming first group to do so. On 9 April heavy clashes erupted between RJ and MNLC in Betin village north of Paoua. Since August 2018 it was reported that RJ was still present at Paoua-Betoko axis extorting local population and erecting checkpoints.

In February 2019 two factions of Revolution and Justice signed peace agreement with the government. In July 2019 RJ reportedly completed its disarmament.
