= Dembia =

- Location in Central African Republic
- Coordinates: 5°6′37″N 24°27′57″E
- Country: Central African Republic
- Prefecture: Mbomou
- Sub-prefecture: Rafai
- Commune: Ouara

Dembia is a village located near the border of Mbomou and Haut-Mbomou Prefecture.

== Insurgency ==
=== LRA attack ===
On 28 March 2010, Lord's Resistance Army (LRA) attacked Dembia. Uganda People's Defence Force (UPDF) soldiers chased the LRA fighters and managed to kill fifteen.

On 18 March 2016, LRA bands attacked Dembia. They looted the villagers' properties and abducted seven people, six men and a woman. They were released three days later. The residents, however, had fled to the bush before the attack happened after they heard the presence of the LRA near Dembia. After the attack, they gradually returned to Dembia. Nevertheless, hearing rumors of an LRA attack, they fled to the bush again. They only went back to Dembia at the end of April.

=== UPC attack ===
UPC rebels from Zemio attacked Dembia on 20 November 2017. They looted and burned 75% of the houses in Dembia. Moreover, they massacred 46 people, 44 men, and 2 women. As a result, the villagers fled to Rafai, Bangassou, and Congo DR. Those who fled to Congo DR returned to the village at the end of April 2019.

The clash between the village's self-defense group and UPC happened in Dembia on 6 July 2023 because the rebels erected a barrier at the crossroad without the villager's approval. Casualties were reported on both sides, and the self-defense group captured one UPC officer. Afterward, he was transferred to Rafai for further investigation.

=== AAKG attack ===
On 1 October 100 AAKG, led by Celestin Bakayogo Leman and Elie Gomengue, entered Dembia and occupied it for six days. During the group occupation, they targeted Muslim and Sudanese asylum seekers and killed around 20 people. Due to the attack, MINUSCA established a temporary base in the village.

AAKG militias stormed FACA soldiers in Dembia on 3 February 2026, capturing four of them.

== Demographics ==
The largest ethnic group in Dembia is Zande, followed by Fula, Nzakara, and Yakoma. Since January 2024, the village has accepted Sudanese refugees.

== Education ==
There is one school in the village.

== Healthcare ==
Dembia has one public health center.

== Security ==
There is a gendarmerie post in Dembia.

== Bibliography ==
- ACTED (22 July 2019). RCA RRM : Evaluation multisectorielle à Guinikoumba et Dembia (Préfectures du Haut-Mbomou et du Mbomou), Rapport(ACTED/22.07.2019) (PDF) (Report).
- MINUSCA (March 2025). Rapport public sur les violations et atteintes graves aux droits de l’homme commises par les Wagner Ti Azandé et les Azandé Ani Kpi Gbé du 1 au 7 octobre 2024 à Dembia et Rafaï, préfecture du Mbomou (PDF) (Report).
