= Markounda =

- Sub-prefecture and town
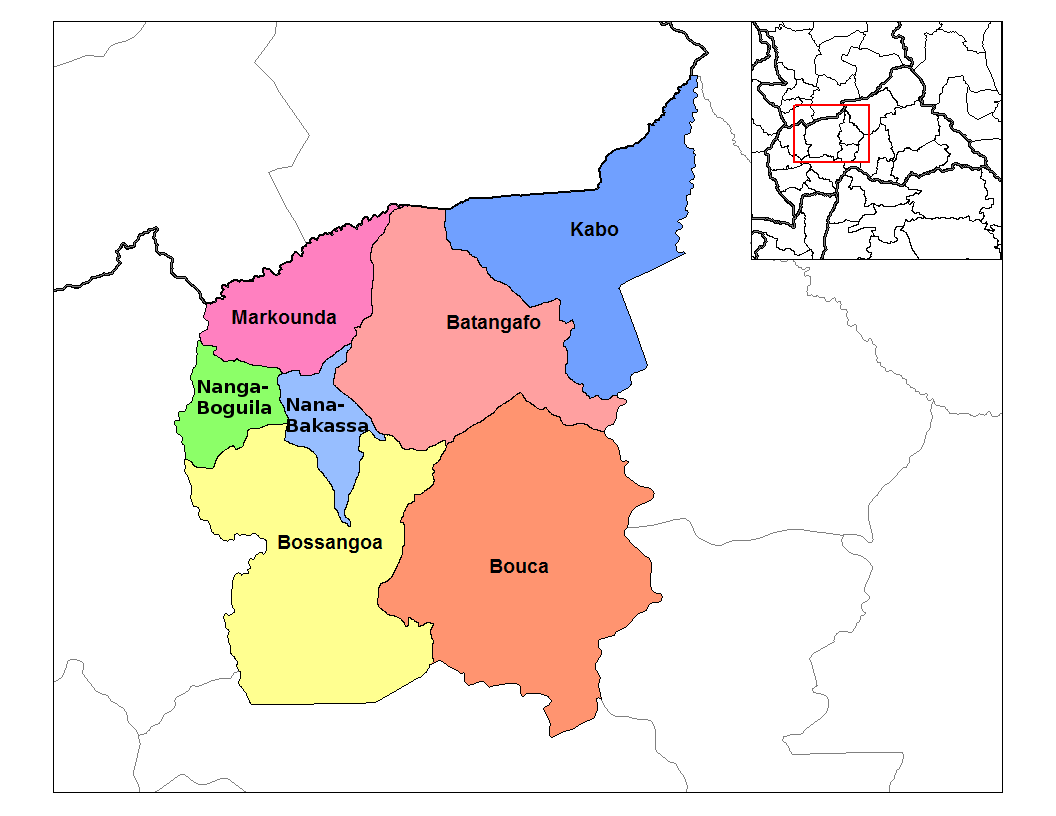
- Sub-prefectures of Ouham

- Location in the Central African Republic
- Coordinates: 7°37′N 16°59′E
- Country: Central African Republic
- Prefecture: Ouham

Government
  - Sub-Prefect: Roger Ngaikouto
- Time zone: UTC+1 (WAT)

Markounda, formerly Fort-Brusseaux, is a sub-prefecture and town in the Ouham Prefecture of the north-western Central African Republic. The sub-prefecture borders with Chad.

== History ==
Codos rebels from Chad attacked Markounda on 9 November 1984, killed the town's police commissioner, and briefly occupied it for several hours. Later, they withdrew to Chad when they heard reinforcement forces would come to the town. The reinforcement forces of the Presidential guard were sent to Markounda, and as they arrived on 10 November, they did not encounter any rebels.

On 1 May 2014 Séléka rebels supported by Chadian mercenaries took control of Markounda from Revolution and Justice armed group. On 19 April 2021 Markounda was recaptured by government forces.
