= Bossangoa =

- Town
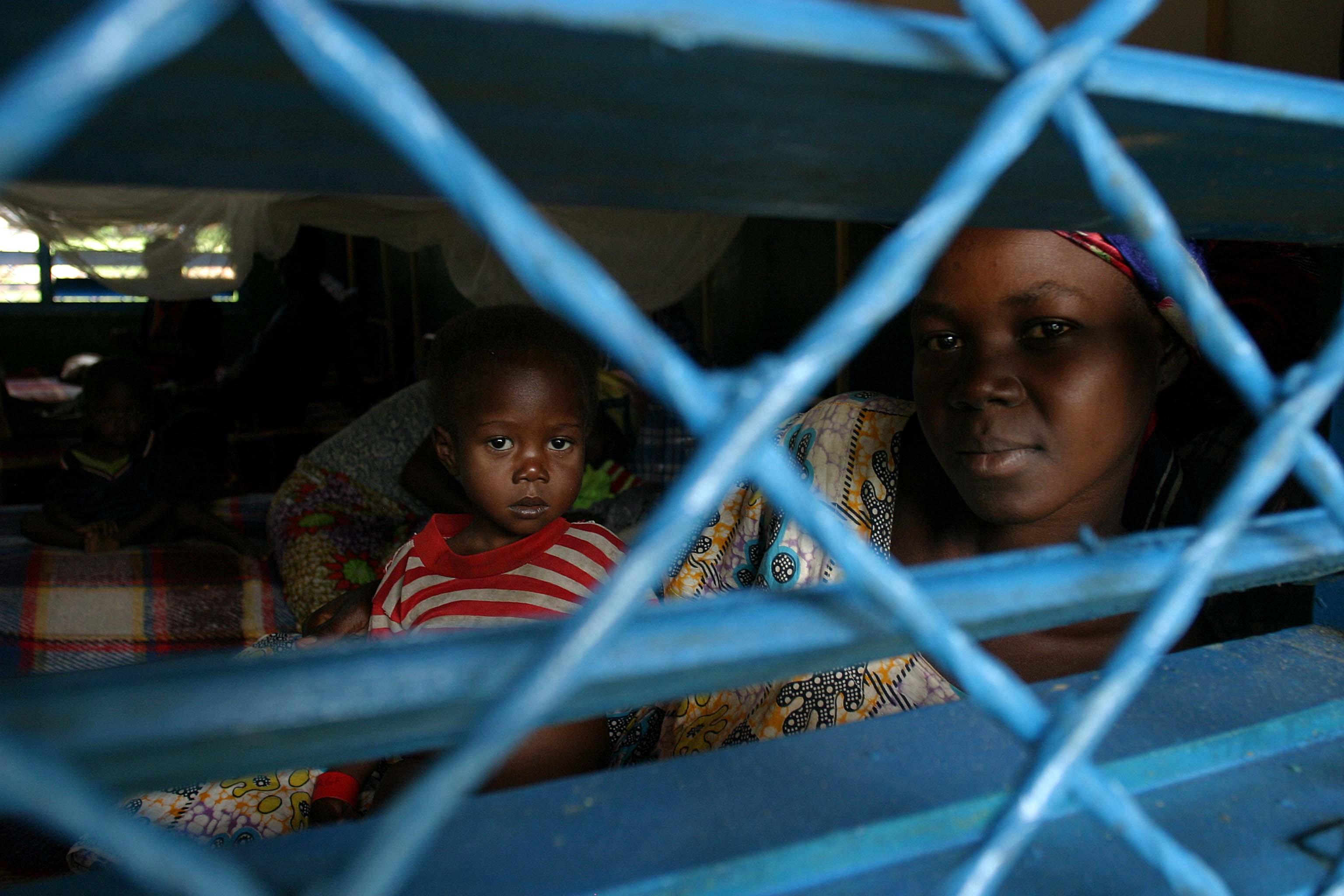
- Nutritional Therapeutic Unit in Bossangoa

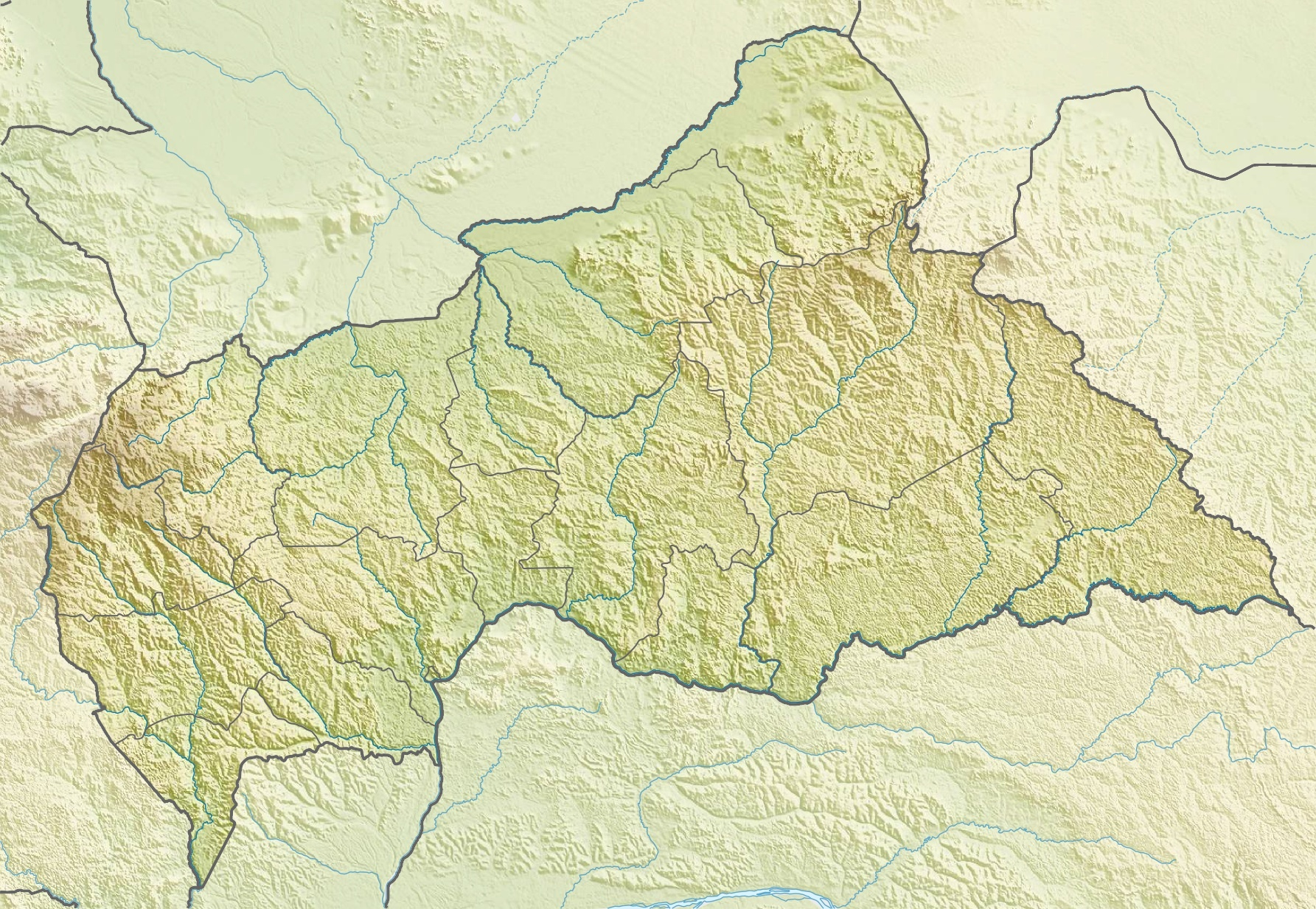
- Location in the Central African Republic
- Coordinates: 6°29′51″N 17°27′00″E
- Country: Central African Republic
- Prefecture: Ouham
- District: Bossangoa

Government
  - Sub-Prefect: Jean Claude Bandore
  - Mayor: Pierre Denamguere
- Elevation: 465 m (1,526 ft)

Population (2012)
  - Total: 38,451
- Time zone: UTC+01:00 (WAT)

Bossangoa is the capital of Ouham, one of the 20 prefectures of the Central African Republic. The town has a population of 36,478 (2003 census). It is located 303 km (189 mi) north of the country's capital, Bangui. The Ouham River passes through Bossangoa and on through a number of waterfalls east of the city before turning north to join the Chari River in Chad.

The Mandjia, the third most populous ethnic group in the Central African Republic, are concentrated in Bossangoa. Along with the Baya, a closely related group, the Mandjia are important historically for their resistance to invasion by various Muslim powers to the north.

== History ==
From 1901 to 1905 Bossangoa and the surrounding area was in rebellion against French colonial authorities. Bossangoa became a center of Protestant missionary activity during the 1920s. In 1959, the city was made the seat of the Apostolic Prefecture of Bossangoa from the Diocese of Berbérati. In 1964, it was promoted as the Diocese of Bossangoa. Bossangoa received electricity in 1970. In June 1980, the city was the scene of clashes between police and farmers over government food policies. The next year French troops were called in to suppress rioting in the aftermath of elections.

=== 2012-2014 Conflict ===
In March 2013, rebels of the Séléka Alliance overtook the town, as part of the 2012-13 Central African Republic conflict. The rebels are seeking to overthrow the government of President of the Central African Republic François Bozizé.

In January 2014, Bossangoa was described as a ghost town, "strangely empty" with "no people, only charred houses and storefronts, block after block of blackened roofless dwellings, an abandoned bank, a gas station stripped down to the metal frames of its pumps, and an emptied city hall." The population, which once numbered 50,000, has mostly fled the city to escape communal violence between Muslims and Christians in the aftermath of the civil war. The population was living in two separate camps – one for Muslims and one for Christians.

In April 2014, Chadian troops escorting a convoy of "the last 540 Muslim residents of the northwestern town of Bossangoa to Goré, Chad," were attacked by local militia as they passed through Boguila." Three people were wounded. On 24 February 2021 government forces captured Bossangoa.

== Climate ==
Bossangoa has a tropical savanna climate (Köppen climate classification Aw).

Climate data for Bossangoa
Month	Jan	Feb	Mar	Apr	May	Jun	Jul	Aug	Sep	Oct	Nov	Dec	Year
Mean daily maximum °C (°F)	35.7 (96.3)	37.5 (99.5)	38.3 (100.9)	36.3 (97.3)	34.4 (93.9)	32.4 (90.3)	31.2 (88.2)	30.9 (87.6)	31.5 (88.7)	32.7 (90.9)	34.3 (93.7)	34.9 (94.8)	34.2 (93.5)
Daily mean °C (°F)	25.1 (77.2)	27.9 (82.2)	29.8 (85.6)	29.4 (84.9)	28.5 (83.3)	26.9 (80.4)	26.1 (79.0)	25.9 (78.6)	26.2 (79.2)	26.6 (79.9)	26.7 (80.1)	25.0 (77.0)	27.0 (80.6)
Mean daily minimum °C (°F)	14.3 (57.7)	18.4 (65.1)	21.3 (70.3)	22.5 (72.5)	22.0 (71.6)	21.4 (70.5)	20.9 (69.6)	20.9 (69.6)	20.7 (69.3)	20.6 (69.1)	19.0 (66.2)	15.0 (59.0)	19.8 (67.5)
Average rainfall mm (inches)	1 (0.0)	6 (0.2)	47 (1.9)	92 (3.6)	141 (5.6)	166 (6.5)	234 (9.2)	279 (11.0)	240 (9.4)	159 (6.3)	22 (0.9)	1 (0.0)	1,388 (54.6)
Mean monthly sunshine hours	265	242	211	211	227	188	165	155	172	198	248	266	2,548
Source 1: Normales et records pour la période 2000-2016 à Bossangoa ,
Source 2: Climate Bossangoa - Central African Republic for rainfall totals , Étude méthodologique pour l'utilisation des données climatologiques de l'Afrique tropicale for sunshine hours

== Economy ==
The main agricultural products are cotton and coffee.

== Transport ==
There is a small local airport that serves light planes.

== See also ==
- List of cities in the Central African Republic
