= Coalition of Patriots for Change =

Rebel groups in the Central African Republic

- Coalition des patriotes pour le changement
- Logo of the group
- Leader: François Bozizé
- Dates active: 15 December 2020–present
- Groups: FPRC; Anti-balaka (anti-government elements); Former: MPC (until 2023) (Note: Despite Mahamat al-Khatim's November 2023 decision to leave CPC, some members of the group chose to stay in the coalition.); 3R (until 2025); UPC (until 2025)
- Headquarters: Bossangoa, Ouham (2020 – February 2021); Markounda, Ouham (February 2021); Kabo, Ouham (March 2021–April 2021); Koumra, Chad (June 2021); N'Djamena, Chad (since July 2021)
- Active regions: Central African Republic, Sudan
- Ideology: Revolutionary nationalism
- Website: Coalition of Patriots for Change on Facebook

The Coalition of Patriots for Change (French: Coalition des patriotes pour le changement; CPC) is a coalition of major rebel groups in the Central African Republic created in 2020 to disrupt the 2020–21 Central African Republic general election.

== Background ==
On 3 December 2020, the Constitutional Court of the Central African Republic rejected the candidature of the former president François Bozizé in the upcoming presidential elections. On 4 December, Bozizé met with Mahamat al-Khatim, leader of the rebel group Central African Patriotic Movement (MPC), in Kaga-Bandoro before leaving for his stronghold of Bossangoa.

Situation in Central African Republic on 3 January 2021 at height of CPC control

== History ==
On 15 December 2020, major rebel groups in the Central African Republic including Anti-balaka, UPC, FPRC, 3R and MPC created a coalition. The group seized many towns including Yaloke and Bossembele. Bambari was also temporarily seized by rebels. On 25 December, the rebels killed three UN peacekeepers and injured two others in Dekoa and Bakouma. Due to rebel attacks, elections did not take place in many areas of the country. Some 800 of the country's polling stations, 14% of the total, were closed due to violence, and during the first round, voting was unable to take place in 29 of the 71 sub-prefectures, while six others only managed to partially vote before being shut down due to voter intimidation. On 15 January, rebels attacked Bangui killing one peacekeeper before being repelled by international forces. On 21 March, the coalition announced that Bozizé had become the group's "general coordinator". On 6 April UPC reportedly left Coalition of Patriots for Change, but officially rejoined in early December 2021.

=== Bozizé–Darassa conflict and split ===
In July 2024, Ali Darassa, leader of UPC and Bozizé's right-hand man, announced the cessation of hostilities with the Touadéra government. According to Bozizé the statement was denied by the entirety of CPC and Darassa was removed from the alliance on 5 August.

On 30 August, Darrassa announced the creation of CPC–Fondamentale (CPC-F), a splinter faction composed mainly of UPC, FRPC and anti-balaka memebers. A recently formed Front de défense pour les libertés publiques (FDLP) group also joined. Haroun Gaye was appointed general coordinator of CPC-F. Despite the creation of CPC-F, many groups within CPC remained loyal to Bozizé, including 3R, remaining elements of MPC and several high-ranking FPRC members. Bozizé subsequently designated the 3R leader, Ramadhane Abdlekader (Sembé Bobbo), as his deputy, and the 3R chief of staff Dobordje Goska, as military chief of staff for the coalition.

Despite the rift, CPC and its splinter faction continued to cooperate on the ground and held a meeting in November 2024, discussing plans to ramp up attacks against FACA. From July to December of the same year, Darassa held negotiations with the government to rejoin the disarmament process, although some senior rebel sources indicated that he was not genuinely committed to peace talks. Ultimately, Darassa didn't rejoin the reconciliation process and ordered CPC-F faction to attack positions of government troops.

=== Dissolution of 3R and UPC ===
A peace agreement was concluded on 19 April 2025, between the Central African government and the armed groups 3R and UPC. They were officially dissolved on 10 July 2025, during a ceremony held in Bangui.
