= Ouham =

Prefecture of the Central African Republic

Coordinates: 7°00′N 18°00′E

- Prefecture
- Ouham in the Central African Republic

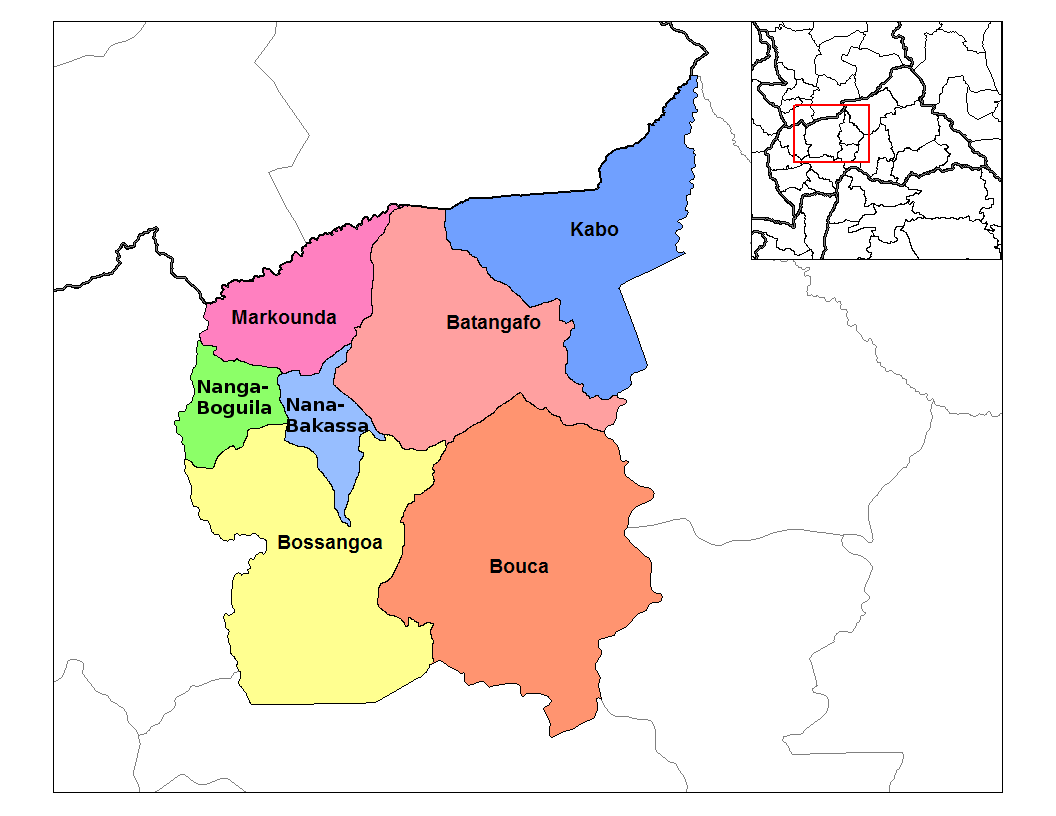
- Sub-prefectures of Ouham before Dec. 2020
- Country: Central African Republic
- Capital: Bossangoa

Government
  - Prefect: Barthelemy Wilikon
  - Deputy Prefect: Gervais Mbiriké

Area
  - Total: 20,240 km^{2} (7,810 sq mi)

Population (2003 census)
  - Total: 369,220
  - Estimate (2024 estimation): 329,645

Ouham is one of the 20 prefectures of the Central African Republic. Its capital is Bossangoa. The prefecture covers an area of 20,240 km² and, according to official estimates, its population was 329,645 inhabitants in 2024. At the time of the country's last official census, in 2003, the population was 369,220 inhabitants in an area of 50,250 km². These are data from before December 2020, when part of the territory was dismembered to create the Ouham-Fafa prefecture.

== Geography ==
The prefecture is in the north-west of the Central African Republic. In the north it has a border with Chad. In the south is the prefecture Ombella-Mpoko, in the west the prefecture Ouham-Pendé and in the east the prefectures Nana-Grébizi and Kémo.

== Sub-prefectures ==
- Bossangoa
- Markounda
- Nana-Bakassa
- Nanga-Boguila
