= Koumboli =

Koumboli Komboli
- Location in Central African Republic
- Coordinates: 5°3′21″N 25°9′3″E
- Country: Central African Republic
- Prefecture: Haut-Mbomou
- Sub-prefecture: Zemio
- Commune: Zemio

Population (2024)
  - Total: 4,000

Koumboli, also known as Komboli, is a village situated in Haut-Mbomou Prefecture, Central African Republic.

== History ==
In 1962, Koumboli had a population of 572 people.

An alleged LRA abducted three men, one woman, and a child in Koumboli on 30 July 2020. LRA splinter group led by Doctor Achaye established a camp in Koumboli on 13 January 2021 and later departed from the village on 20 January.

A clash broke out between Azande Ani Kpi Gbe and FACA-Wagner in Koumboli on 30 April 2025 after Azande militias refused to disarm. Due to the attack, four soldiers were killed and two soldiers injured. On 9 May 2025, Azande Ani Kpi Gbe ambushed joint FACA-Wagner patrol in the village's forest.

== Education ==
There is a school in Koumboli.

== Healthcare ==
Koumboli has one health post.
