= Guibéré =

- Location in Central African Republic
- Coordinates: 5°15′51″N 25°14′54″E
- Country: Central African Republic
- Prefecture: Haut-Mbomou
- Sub-prefecture: Zemio
- Commune: Zemio

Guibéré is a village situated in Haut-Mbomou Prefecture, Central African Republic.

== History ==
The locals sought refuge in Zemio at the end of May 2010 due to the LRA's attack threat. LRA stormed the village on 26 January 2016, prompting the residents to flee to Zemio. An alleged LRA attacked the RTF Regional Task Force truck in Guibéré on 15 January 2017.

== Healthcare ==
The residents go to Tambourah to seek medical treatment since there is no health infrastructure in the village.
