= Barraoua =

- Location in Central African Republic
- Coordinates: 5°35′54″N 24°42′26″E
- Country: Central African Republic
- Prefecture: Mbomou
- Sub-prefecture: Rafai
- Commune: Rafai

Barraoua, also spelled Baroua, is a village located in Mbomou Prefecture, Central African Republic.

== History ==
In October 2009, LRA attacked Barraoua twice and abducted 29 people. One month later, LRA invaded Barroua on 24 November 2009, killing one person and abducting 24 people. On 5 January 2010, LRA raided Barroua. They killed three civilians and abducted three villagers. On 1 October 2010, LRA attacked the village and kidnapped 19 people. Two years later, on 18 January 2012, Barroua was attacked by LRA.

Responding to the LRA's attack in Derbissaka on 7 November 2023, the villagers fled to Dembia on 19 November. By 25 November, all of the houses in Barroua were burned. LRA splinter group led by Doctor Achaye attacked the village on 30 May 2016.

== Healthcare ==
Barraoua has one public health post.
