= Aliwali =

- Location in Central African Republic
- Coordinates: 5°3′13″N 25°3′45″E
- Country: Central African Republic
- Prefecture: Haut-Mbomou
- Sub-prefecture: Zemio
- Commune: Zemio

Population (2014)
  - Total: 230

Aliwali is a village located 12 km from Zemio in Haut-Mbomou Prefecture, Central African Republic.

== History ==
On 20 November 2014, two houses were burned in Aliwali by an armed group to avenge the death of Peuhls in Zemio. Due to this incident, the villagers decided to sleep in the bush and only returned to the village after sunrise. Around March 2016, Aliwali residents fled the village and sought refuge either in Zemio or the bush, responding to the LRA attack in Tabane on 5 March. Later, they returned to the village.

As of August 2023, the villagers live under the terror of UPC terror. Every week, UPC rebels visited the village and coerced the residents to give money and food. They will beat the people who do not have money.

== Economy ==
Locals harvest peanuts, corn, squash, and cassava and they sell those foods at the markets in Zemio and Tabane.

== Bibliography ==
- ACTED (2 December 2014). Evaluation Multisectorielle RRM Barh, Bogou et Aliwali Rapport Préliminaire du 02/12/2014 (PDF) (Report).
