= Maboussou =

- Location in Central African Republic
- Coordinates: 5°27′43″N 25°38′24″E
- Country: Central African Republic
- Prefecture: Haut-Mbomou
- Sub-prefecture: Zemio
- Commune: Zemio

Maboussou, also spelled Mabousou, is a village located in Haut-Mbomou Prefecture, Central African Republic.

== History ==
On 28 July 2009, LRA raided Maboussou. They looted civilian's properties and a health post.

On 27 August 2009, 19 LRA fighters under the command of Major Olanya attacked Maboussou. They killed three people, raped one woman, and abducted eight villagers.

LRA militias attacked Maboussou on 20 March 2011. They looted food stores and abducted the villagers.

On 15 September 2014, LRA militias attacked the village. They abducted five people and looted food. Later, they freed four hostages.

In 2019, Maboussou was controlled by UPC.

A skirmish between UPC and Azande Ani Kpi Gbe occurred in Maboussou on 22 and 23 February 2024, leading the residents sought refuge in Zemio.

== Healthcare ==
Maboussou has one health post.
