= Bogou =

- Location in Central African Republic
- Coordinates: 5°6′50″N 24°53′51″E
- Country: Central African Republic
- Prefecture: Haut-Mbomou
- Sub-prefecture: Zemio
- Commune: Zemio

Population (2014)
  - Total: 323

Bogou is a village situated in Haut-Mbomou Prefecture, Central African Republic.

== History ==
On 16 November 2014, an armed group attacked Bogou and burned 34 houses in response to the assassination of a Muslim merchant in Sélim.

== Healthcare ==
Bogou has one health post.
