= Rosalie Nawira =

Central African politician

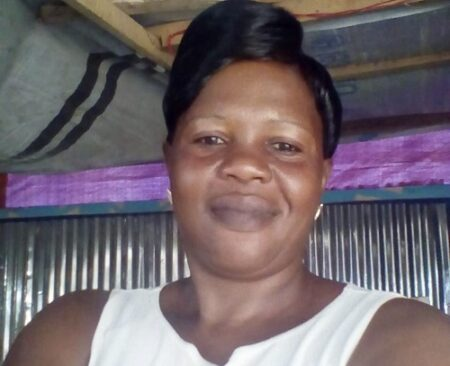

Mayor of Zemio

Personal details
- Born: 1968 (age 57–58)

Rosalie Nawira (born 1968) is a Central African politician and a current mayor of Zemio.

== Early life and career ==
Born in 1968, Nawira learned the trade from his father. Nawira lost her father at the age of 12. Four years later, she became orphaned when her mother died. Afterward, she started her career as a merchant. She traded many items, such as food, clothes, bicycle parts, and ivory. In 1999, an agricultural bazaar was held in Zemio, and she was tasked to manage the budgets for the event.

== Mayor of Zemio ==
=== December 2014 Zemio Violence ===
In 2014, sectarian violence between Muslims and Christians broke up in Zemio. Responding to this horizontal conflict, Nawira tried to persuade the local police and UPDF to approach two warring parties. However, they refused to do it and instead asked her to meet the groups. She accepted it and convinced them to end the conflict. With her persuasion, both groups agreed to stop the conflict and even apologize for the tension they created. Nawira's success in easing the tension led her to be invited to Bangui to speak at National Transitional Council.

=== Women rights ===
Nawira created a group Femme Action Plus to empower women and support the LRA's returnees. She was appointed as the organization coordinator.

=== Taxation ===
Nawira imposed taxes on several things. For the displaced people who returned to the town and wanted to rebuild houses, she taxed them at 25,000 CFA Francs. Besides, she ordered the sellers of a Central African traditional drink, ngouli , and a person who braids hair at houses to pay tax at 10.000 CFA Francs. Imported cassavas from Congo are taxed at 1,000 CFA francs, while the person who distributed it has to pay 500 CFA francs. Anyone who wants to sell cassava in the town must pay a tax of 500 CFA Francs for each bowl.

Nawira's tax policy was controversial since it burdened the town residents, who mostly lived in miserable conditions. The economic adviser of Haut-Mbomou Prefecture called her tax policies "unacceptable".

=== Kidnapping and arrest ===
On 3 July 2023, UPC members from Mboki visited Zemio and kidnapped Nawira. She was then released several hours later after the intervention from locals who asked the rebels to release the hostage.

On 27 May 2024, Wagner arrested Nawira for weapon possession and collaborating with UPC.

Nawira fled to Bangui on 3 April 2025 after a demonstration happened in Zemio.
