= Madabazouma =

Village in Mbomou, Central African Republic

- Location in Central African Republic
- Coordinates: 4°55′34″N 23°33′14″E
- Country: Central African Republic
- Prefecture: Mbomou
- Sub-prefecture: Bangassou
- Commune: Zangandou

Population (2020)
  - Total: 600

Madabazouma is a village situated in Mbomou Prefecture, Central African Republic.

== History ==
LRA militias attacked Madabazouma on 4 July 2020, killing four and kidnapping 7 people. On 16 January 2011, the LRA raided the village.

LRA stormed Madabazouma on 18 September 2026, killing one and abducting 11 villagers.

== Education ==
There is a school in Madabazouma.

== Healthcare ==
Madabazouma has one health post. In 2025, the WHO reported that the health post was "partially functioning".

== Bibliography ==
- ACTED (September 2020). RAPPORT D'EVALUATION MULTISECTORIELLE (MSA) Madabazouma, commune de Zangandou-Madabazouma, sous-préfecture de Bangassou, préfecture du Mbomou ; Sélim, Katambour, Guérékindo et Dembia, commune de Rafaï, sous-préfecture de Rafaï, préfecture du Mbomou (Report).
