= Katambour =

Village in Mbomou, Central African Republic

- Location in Central African Republic
- Coordinates: 4°58′30″N 24°8′19″E
- Country: Central African Republic
- Prefecture: Mbomou
- Sub-prefecture: Rafai
- Commune: Rafai

Population (2020)
  - Total: 168

Katambour is a village situated in Mbomou Prefecture, Central African Republic.

== History ==
LRA attacked Katambour on 3 May 2010, killing one and injuring 15 people. LRA's splinter group led by Doctor Achaye invaded the village on 5 November 2016. They abducted a hunter and looted the village.
