= Kadjéma =

- Location in Central African Republic
- Coordinates: 5°15′16″N 26°11′28″E
- Country: Central African Republic
- Prefecture: Haut-Mbomou
- Sub-prefecture: Obo
- Commune: Obo

Kadjéma, also spelled Kadjemah, is a village located in Haut-Mbomou Prefecture, Central African Republic.

== History ==
On 27 September 2009, LRA bands attacked Kadjema and killed one person. In December 2009, LRA fighters invaded Kadjéma and abducted five people.

On 14 June 2016, LRA raided Kadjéma. They kidnapped 17 people and looted the civilians' properties. A year later, on 18 August 2017, LRA attacked Kadjéma. The militias abducted six people and looted the health center.

UPC attacked Azande Ani Kpi Gbe militia on 23 May 2023 in Kadjéma. The battle lasted for two hours and UPC captured the village. Due to the attack, the villagers fled to the bush. LRA attacked the village on 24 June 2026 and captured one person. This attack caused the villagers fled to Obo.

== Healthcare ==
Kadjéma has one health center.
