= Derbissaka =

- Location in Central African Republic
- Coordinates: 5°46′39″N 24°51′11″E
- Country: Central African Republic
- Prefecture: Mbomou
- Sub-prefecture: Rafai
- Commune: Rafai

Derbissaka, also spelled Derbisaka, is a village located in Mbomou, Central African Republic.

== History ==
At the end of October 2009, LRA launched the first attack in Derbissaka. They looted and burned houses and granaries as well as kidnapped 28 people. On 7 November 2013, LRA attacked Derbissaka and injured two people. As a result, the village residents fled to Dembia and Djemah. They only returned to Derbissaka in December 2014.

In 2015, Derbissaka was attacked twice by an armed group. The first occurred on 27 February while the second one on 14 March. The armed group looted the village and the residents fled to the bush. One year later, on 18 October, LRA raided Derbissaka in the retaliation for their missing members who previously participated in the past attack in the village. They abducted three people.

== Healthcare ==
Derbissaka has one public health post.
