= Ligoua =

- Location in Central African Republic
- Coordinates: 5°13′17″N 26°36′22″E
- Country: Central African Republic
- Prefecture: Haut-Mbomou
- Sub-prefecture: Obo
- Commune: Obo

Ligoua (also known as Likhoua, Ligua, Ligwa, and Ligoua-Zewia) is a village located in Haut-Mbomou, Central African Republic. The village has received several attacks from LRA from 2008 to 2020. Food is the reason for LRA to raid Ligoua.

== History ==
The first LRA attack in Ligoua occurred on 8 March 2008 when LRA raided the village and abducted five people. On 20 June 2009, LRA fighters attacked Ligoua. They looted residents' properties, burned houses, and killed one person. One month later, on 21 July 2009, LRA raided Ligoua and kidnapped 13 people. Onn 19 August 2009, LRA attacked Ligoua and kidnapped the villagers, including children and traders. Between the end of June to August 2009, LRA carried out seven attacks in Ligoua. By March 2010, Ligoua became a ghost town.

Two high-frequency (HF) radios were set in Ligoua in May 2015 under the USAID-funded Project, SEEC.

Ligoua residents had to flee to Obo after receiving the news of three bodies found near the village on 30 October 2015, in which they were kidnapped and later executed by LRA bands.

On 13 February 2019, Ligoua was attacked by LRA militias. They abducted three people and looted villagers' properties before they fled to the bush. LRA raided Ligoua on 28 September 2020 at 3 PM and they kidnapped ten people. This attack resulted in the villagers seeking refuge in Obo.

Alleged UPC kidnapped five people in Ligoua on 6 August 2023.

== Healthcare ==
Ligouahas one health post.

== Bibliography ==
- Cakaj, Ledio (2016). When The Walking Defeats You: One Man's Journey as Joseph Kony's Bodyguard. London: Zed Books. ISBN 9781783608126.
