= Ngouyo =

- Location in Central African Republic
- Coordinates: 5°44′32″N 25°18′35″E
- Country: Central African Republic
- Prefecture: Haut-Mbomou
- Sub-prefecture: Zemio
- Commune: Zemio

Ngouyo is a village located in Haut-Mbomou Prefecture, Central African Republic.

== History ==
Between 15 July and 20 November 2010, LRA militias attacked Ngouyo. They killed eight people, burned 35 houses, and kidnapped four people.

In December 2011, LRA raided Ngouyo twice. Due to the attack, UPDF soldiers were deployed to Ngouyo. Nevertheless, LRA carried out another three attacks in March 2012. On 9 March 2012, LRA bands abducted six people, five men and one woman, and looted civilian property in Ngouyo.

== Healthcare ==
Ngouyo has one health post.

== Bibliography ==
- MINUSCA (May 2017). Report of the Mapping Project documenting serious violations of international human rights law and international humanitarian law committed within the territory of Central African Republic between January 2003 and December 2015 (PDF) (Report). MINUSCA.
