= Agoumar =

- Location in Central African Republic
- Coordinates: 5°0′12″N 23°54′40″E
- Country: Central African Republic
- Prefecture: Mbomou
- Sub-prefecture: Rafai
- Commune: Rafai

Agoumar is a village located in Mbomou. It is situated near Rafai town in Central African Republic.

== History ==
LRA bands attacked Agoumar on 21 March 2010 for five hours. They kidnapped 16 people and killed eight people. The militias burned houses and barns and looted the villager's properties. Consequently, some residents fled to Bangassou while others went to DR Congo.

LRA attacked Agoumar on 16 January 2011 and they kidnapped young girls.

On 17 April 2016, LRA militia led by Achaye 'Doctor' attacked Agoumar.They pillaged granaries and other stuff. The residents fled to the nearby bush. However, local self-defense groups repelled the LRA attack and captured three. After the attack, the Moroccan contingent of MINUSCA visited Agoumar and demanded the villagers hand over the injured LRA militia. The villagers refused to accept the demand and a clash between the locals and MINUSCA forces ensued that resulted in two deaths, including a Moroccan peacekeeper. Nevertheless, MINUSCA was able to retrieve an injured LRA militia and bring him to Rafai hospital.

== Education ==
There is one school in the village.

== Healthcare ==
Agoumar has one public health center and a community health center run by AIM.

== Bibliography ==
- MINUSCA (11 August 2016). Letter dated 9 August 2016 from the Panel of Experts on the Central African Republic extended pursuant to Security Council resolution 2262 (2016) addressed to the President of the Security Council (Report). UN Security Council.
