= Sélim =

- Location in Central African Republic
- Coordinates: 4°56′49″N 23°39′42″E
- Country: Central African Republic
- Prefecture: Mbomou
- Sub-prefecture: Rafai
- Commune: Rafai

Population (2020)
  - Total: 5,886

Sélim is a village situated in Mbomou Prefecture, Central African Republic.

== History ==
In 2009, the 25-meter-long bridge in Sélim was rehabilitated for two months.

On third week of March 2011, LRA attacked Sélim.

Responding to the death of a biker by the herders, armed herders clashed with the Sélim's farmers on 11 October 2013 in Sélim. Four people died, including one farmer and three herders. Three houses were also burned. On the next day, ex-Séléka officials visited Sélim to disarm the villagers. Unfortunately, they only managed to disarm the farmers as the herders had left from the village.

On 13 October 2013, 20 armed herders visited Sélim intending to buy cows. However, they attacked and looted the trader and village chief's house. Moreover, they burned hundreds of houses, granaries, and 20 motorcycles. Villager houses were also pillaged. Four people died, including two persons who died inside their house during the fire. The militias abducted three women and released them three days later. As a result, the residents fled to Agoumar, Rafaï, and Bangassou.

== Economy ==
The villagers cultivated cassava, sesame, banana, yam, and taro for daily staples. They also raise livestock animals which are goats, sheep, chickens, and ducks.

== Education ==
Sélim has one school. Studies were interrupted in 2013 due to the country's political situation. Nevertheless, the teachers, parents, and students planned to reopen the school in October 2013 as the new academic year began. Following the October 2013 attack, however, the school reopening plan was aborted.

== Healthcare ==
The village has one health center. During October 2013 attack, the armed militia looted the medicines in the health center.

== Bibliography ==
- ACTED (November 2013). Rapport d’Evaluation Rapid Response Mechanism – RRM Sélim, Sous-préfecture de Rafaï, Préfecture du Mbomou (PDF) (Report).
