= Kpété =

- Location in Central African Republic
- Coordinates: 4°59′31.3908″N 23°53′27.222″E
- Country: Central African Republic
- Prefecture: Mbomou
- Sub-prefecture: Rafaï
- Commune: Rafai
- Elevation: 1,906 ft (581 m)
- Time zone: UTC+1 (West Africa Time)

Kpété is a village in Rafaï Subprefecture, Mbomou prefecture, Central African Republic. It is located at around 4°59′31.3908″N 23°53′27.222″E, in the elevation of around 581 metres.

== Climate ==
Kpété has a Tropical savanna climate (Aw) with dry, warm winters and wet, cooler summers.

Climate data for Lujulo
| Month | Jan | Feb | Mar | Apr | May | Jun | Jul | Aug | Sep | Oct | Nov | Dec | Year |
|---|---|---|---|---|---|---|---|---|---|---|---|---|---|
| Mean daily maximum °C (°F) | 31 (88) | 32 (90) | 31.7 (89.1) | 30.3 (86.5) | 30.2 (86.4) | 29.2 (84.6) | 28.8 (83.8) | 28.8 (83.8) | 29.4 (84.9) | 29.5 (85.1) | 29.8 (85.6) | 30.3 (86.5) | 30.1 (86.2) |
| Daily mean °C (°F) | 24.2 (75.6) | 25 (77) | 25.3 (77.5) | 25.1 (77.2) | 24.7 (76.5) | 24 (75) | 23.7 (74.7) | 23.6 (74.5) | 23.9 (75.0) | 24 (75) | 23.9 (75.0) | 23.9 (75.0) | 24.3 (75.7) |
| Mean daily minimum °C (°F) | 17.5 (63.5) | 18 (64) | 18.9 (66.0) | 19.9 (67.8) | 19.3 (66.7) | 18.9 (66.0) | 18.6 (65.5) | 18.5 (65.3) | 18.5 (65.3) | 18.6 (65.5) | 18 (64) | 17.6 (63.7) | 18.5 (65.3) |
| Average precipitation mm (inches) | 17 (0.7) | 56 (2.2) | 103 (4.1) | 157 (6.2) | 203 (8.0) | 199 (7.8) | 208 (8.2) | 232 (9.1) | 223 (8.8) | 253 (10.0) | 116 (4.6) | 29 (1.1) | 1,796 (70.8) |
Source: Climate-Data.org
