= Tambourah =

- Location in Central African Republic
- Coordinates: 5°10′37″N 25°11′57″E
- Country: Central African Republic
- Prefecture: Haut-Mbomou
- Sub-prefecture: Zemio
- Commune: Zemio

Tambourah, also spelled Tamboura, is a village located in Haut-Mbomou Prefecture, Central African Republic.

== History ==
On 19 January 2016, LRA fighters raided Tambourah and abducted 16 people. Consequently, the residents fled and sought refuge in Zemio.

In August 2016, ACTED rehabilitated the village's well.

Due to the LRA's attack in Bangassou-Nzakara in January 2017, Tambourah was emptied. Most of the residents sought refuge in the bush, while some went to Zemio.

== Healthcare ==
Tambourah has one health post.
