= Rosalie Pouzère =

Member of National Assembly
- In office 2005–?
- Constituency: Djemah

Personal details
- Born: 1944 (age 81–82) Djemah, Ubangi-Shari (now the present-day Central African Republic)
- Spouse: Henri Pouzère
- Occupation: Politician, banker

Rosalie Pouzère (née Moussoukourou; born 1944) is a Central African politician and a former member of National Assembly.

== Early life and education ==
Born in 1944 in Djemah, Rosalie Pouzère was born with the name Rosalie Moussoukourou and belongs to the Vungara clan of Zande. Her family was related to the former sultans of the eastern Central African Republic region. She and her family moved to Bangui at six years old. In Bangui, she enrolled in the school and converted to Catholic. During her youth, she joined organizations such as A Ita Koue and Association nationale des étudiants centrafricains (ANECA). For the former, she became the leader.

She then moved to France to continue her studies and finished it with a master's degree in business law.

== Career ==
After marrying Henri Pouzère, she moved to Gabon due to her husband opposition to Bokassa. Pouzère worked as a banker in Gabon until 2004.

In 2005, she returned to Central African Republic and ran for the 2005 election as a National Assembly member candidate representing Djemah district. She was elected. In National Assembly, she joined the opposition faction. As an opposition, she criticized the lack of government action in solving the LRA issue in Haut-Mbomou.

As of 2022, she was a member of the executive board of Directoire de Citoyens Debout et Solidaires.

== Work ==
- Fleur de Djemah (2016)
