= Guinikoumba =

- Location in Central African Republic
- Coordinates: 5°5′37″N 24°36′26″E
- Country: Central African Republic
- Prefecture: Haut-Mbomou
- Sub-prefecture: Zemio
- Commune: Zemio

Guinikoumba, also spelled Guénékoumba, is a village located in Haut-Mbomou Prefecture, Central African Republic.

== History ==
In 2013, an unknown armed group attacked a van that transported vaccines to Zemio 2 km from Guinikoumba. They killed the doctors and the crews and burned the vehicle. Subsequently, the villagers felt threatened by the presence of an armed group near their village. They decided to take refuge in a field 15 km downstream from the village. As a result, Guinikoumba temporarily became a ghost town. The residents soon returned to the village.

On 25 April 2015, 17 LRA militias raided Guinikoumba. They looted houses, a school, and a health post and abducted two people. A clash between the local and LRA ensued, injuring one LRA militia. The residents fled Guinikoumba and only returned one week after the attack.

== Education ==
Guinikoumba has one school. In 2013, JUPEDEC constructed a school building with three classrooms to replace the straw school that was built by the community. However, in 2015, the construction was halted due to insecurity.

== Healthcare ==
Guinikoumba has one health post.

== Bibliography ==
- ACTED (20 June 2015a). RRM RCA : Evaluation Multisectorielle à Guinikoumba (Haut-Mbomou) - Rapport Complet (PDF) (Report). p. 4.
