= Guérékindo =

- Location in Central African Republic
- Coordinates: 5°4′39″N 24°20′37″E
- Country: Central African Republic
- Prefecture: Mbomou
- Sub-prefecture: Rafai
- Commune: Rafai

Guérékindo, also spelled Guerekindo, is a village located in Mbomou Prefecture, Central African Republic. In 2010, the village received several incursions from LRA.

== History ==
On 28 and 29 March 2010, LRA militias stormed Guérékindo. They looted civilian properties and abducted 14 people. On 3 April 2010, LRA attacked Guérékindo and killed seven people. One month later, on 14 May 2010, LRA raided Guérékindo. However, the villagers repelled the attack with knives, bows and arrows, machetes, and guns. They killed two LRA fighters and captured others.

LRA raided Guérékindo for the fourth time on 19 October 2010. They kidnapped six villagers and pillaged civilian properties.

On 7 March 2018, an armed group attacked and captured Guérékindo. The residents fled to the bush.

== Healthcare ==
Guérékindo has one public health center.

== Bibliography ==
- MINUSCA (May 2017). Report of the Mapping Project documenting serious violations of international human rights law and international humanitarian law committed within the territory of Central African Republic between January 2003 and December 2015 (PDF) (Report). MINUSCA.
