= Fodé =

- Location in Central African Republic
- Coordinates: 5°29′20″N 23°19′17″E
- Country: Central African Republic
- Prefecture: Mbomou
- Sub-prefecture: Bangassou
- Commune: Voungba Balifondo

Fodé is a village located in Mbomou Prefecture, Central African Republic.

== History ==
On 7 June 2010, LRA raided Fodé. They burned some houses and looted civilian properties. Furthermore, the militia abducted 30 people from the village. LRA militias attacked the village again on 29 April 2017. Two people were killed and LRA kidnapped some villagers. Fifty houses were burned by LRA. As a result, some residents fled to Bangassou while others hid in the bush.

== Economy ==
Some of the village residents rely on hunting wild game for their main income. However, the locals abandoned elephant poaching in 2012 due to the presence of LRA and the animal was rarely encountered.

== Healthcare ==
Fodé has one health post.
