= Finzane =

Finzane Fenzane, Finzani
- Location in Central African Republic
- Coordinates: 5°6′28″N 25°9′28″E
- Country: Central African Republic
- Prefecture: Haut-Mbomou
- Sub-prefecture: Zemio
- Commune: Zemio

Finzane, also written Fenzane or Finzani is a village located 10 km from northern Zemio in Haut-Mbomou Prefecture, Central African Republic.

== History ==
Finzane had a population of 348 people in 1962.

At the end of May 2010, the villagers fled to Zemio due to the LRA's attack threat. On 31 January 2017, an armed group attacked Finzane, killing two people. In December 2018, armed Peuhl militia attacked the village, prompting the MINUSCA to send its peacekeeping forces.
