= Bassigbiri =

- Location in Central African Republic
- Coordinates: 5°19′42″N 26°55′11″E
- Country: Central African Republic
- Prefecture: Haut-Mbomou
- Sub-prefecture: Bambouti
- Commune: Lili

Bassigbiri, also spelled Gbassigbiri and Gbazibri, is a village located in Haut-Mbomou Prefecture, Central African Republic.

== History ==
On 25 February 2008, LRA militias led by Okot Odhiambo attacked Bassigbiri. They abducted 40 people and brought the hostages to LRA's camp in Garamba National Park. It is the first known LRA attack in the Central African Republic.

Around 15 July-1 August 2009, LRA raided Bassigbiri for the second time.

In 2023, the village becomes the headquarter of Azande Ani Kpi Gbe militia.
