= Niakari =

- Location in Central African Republic
- Coordinates: 4°50′32″N 22°45′07″E
- Country: Central African Republic
- Prefecture: Mbomou
- Sub-prefecture: Bangassou
- Commune: Sayo-Niakari

Niakari is a village located in the Central African Republic prefecture of Mbomou north of Bangassou.

== History ==
=== Civil war ===
On 17 January 2021, fighters of Coalition of Patriots for Change led by Mahamat Salleh departed the city of Bangassou and moved to Niakari. There they committed cases of sexual violence including a case of forced marriage involving a minor. They also occupied local primary school since 21 January. They finally left Niakari on 20 February. On 9 March, another group of CPC fighters belonging to Union for Peace in the Central African Republic was reportedly present in Niakari. Overall Niakari was occupied by armed groups for two months during which they plundered food and medicines.

In May 2021, prime minister Ngrebada Firmin reported than Niakari was free from armed groups and population returned to their activities. In October 2021, reportedly more than 100 refugees were present in camp in Niakari fleeing from violence with only one borehole with water. Access to food was also a problem reportedly.
