= Bahr, Central African Republic =

Bahr
- Location in Central African Republic
- Coordinates: 5°7′11″N 24°50′25″E
- Country: Central African Republic
- Prefecture: Haut-Mbomou
- Sub-prefecture: Zemio
- Commune: Zemio

Population (2020)
  - Total: 382

Bahr, also spelled Barh, is a village located in Haut-Mbomou Prefecture, Central African Republic.

== History ==
UNICEF built a borehole equipped with a manual pump in 2002 to provide clean drinking water access for Bahr residents. Unfortunately, the pump was broken at the end of 2002.

Revenging the death of a Muslim merchant death in Sélim by an unknown person, the victim's family armed with weapons entered Bahr on 15 November 2014 and clashed with the locals. No casualties were reported and the victim families retreated from the village. An armed group attacked Bahr on 1 December 2014. They burned 18 houses and two straw huts. Three people died and two were injured.

On 4 September 2016 at 4 am, an armed group raided Bahr. The villagers fled to the bush and the militias looted houses and kiosks. The local residents returned to the village in the evening.

FACA attacked UPC in the village in July or August 2024.

== Education ==
Bahr has one school. In 2016, the militia destroyed the school materials.

== Healthcare ==
The village has one health post.

== Bibliography ==
- ACTED (10 April 2016). RCA RRM : Evaluation Multisectorielle à Zemio (Haut Mbomou), Rapport Préliminaire (ACTED/10.04.2016) (PDF) (Report).
