= Bangassou-Nzakara =

Bangassou-Nzakara Bangassou-Djakara
- Location in Central African Republic
- Coordinates: 5°12′4″N 25°10′57″E
- Country: Central African Republic
- Prefecture: Haut-Mbomou
- Sub-prefecture: Zemio
- Commune: Zemio

Bangassou-Nzakara, also known as Bangassou-Djakara, is a village situated in Haut-Mbomou Prefecture, Central African Republic.

== History ==
LRA attacked Bangassou-Nzakara on 28 March 2013 and stole food. Alleged LRA raided Bangassou-Nzakara on 15 January 2017. They looted granaries and houses and kidnapped civilians. Due to the attack, the villagers fled to the bush. The village was attacked again by an alleged LRA on 23 April 2017.

== Health ==
Bangassou-Nzakara has one health post.
