= Diocese of Bangassou =

Roman Catholic diocese in the Central African Republic

Coordinates: 4.7447°N 22.8200°E

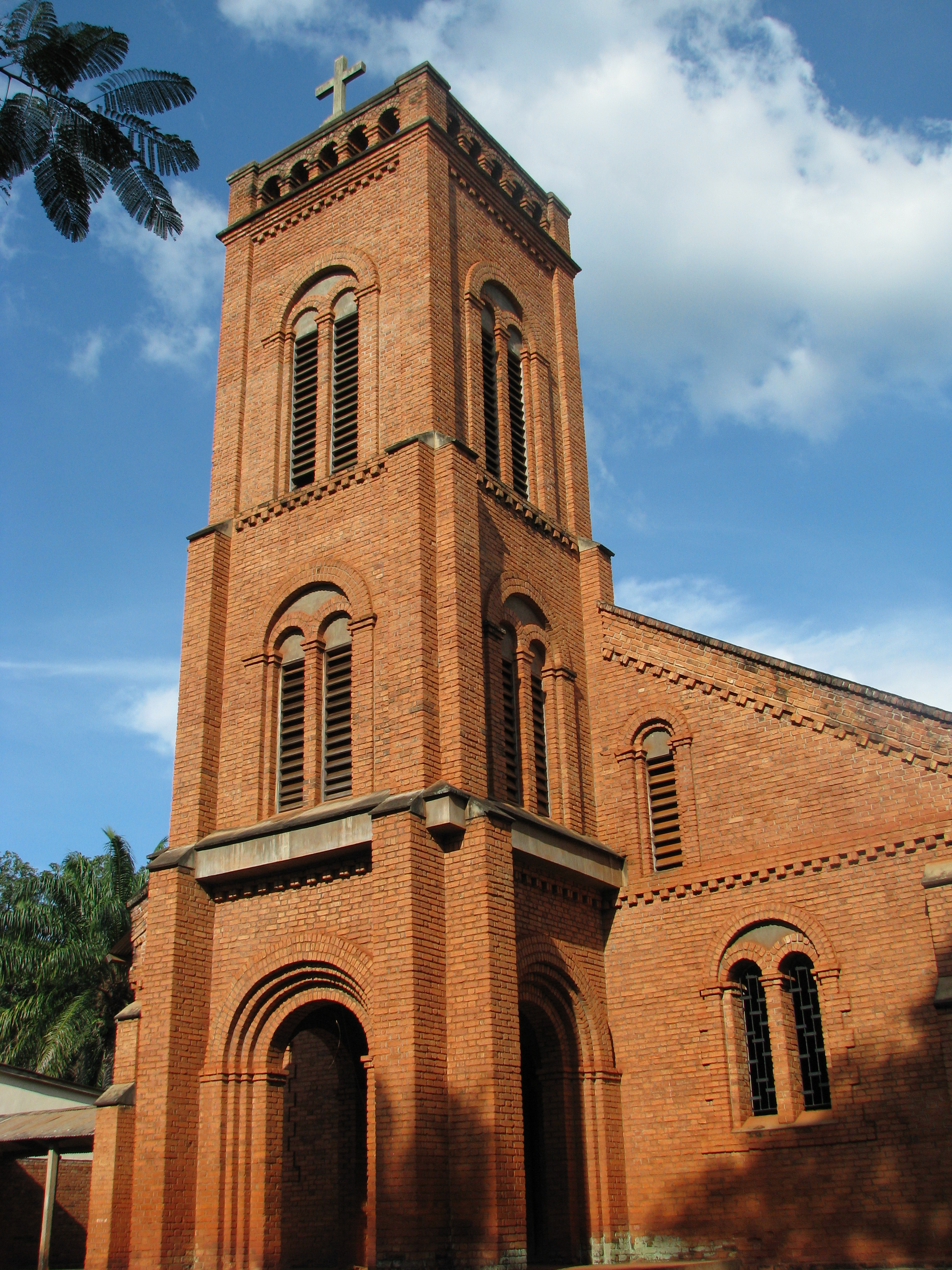
Cathédrale Saint Pierre Claver, seat of the Catholic diocese of Bangassou

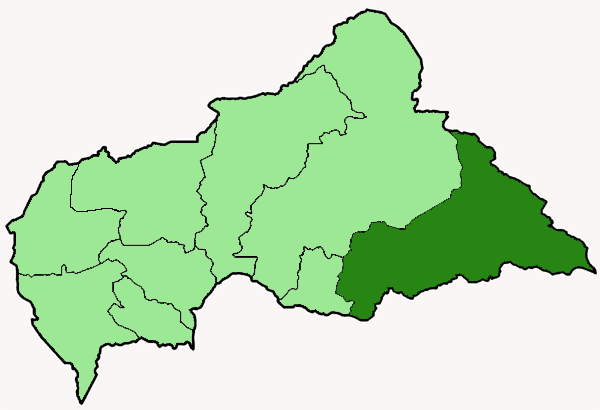
Map of the Roman Catholic Diocese of Bangassou in eastern Central African Republic.

The Roman Catholic Diocese of Bangassou (Latin: Bangassuen(sis)) is a suffragan diocese in the Central African Republic in the ecclesiastical province of Bangui. The diocese is dependent on the missionary Dicastery for Evangelization.

Its cathedral episcopal see is Cathédrale Saint Pierre Claver, dedicated to Jesuit Saint Peter Claver, in Bangassou, Mbomou prefecture.

== History ==
- Established on 14 June 1954 as Apostolic Prefecture of Bangassou, on territory split off from the Apostolic Vicariate of Bangui, its future Metropolitan
- Promoted to Diocese of Bangassou on 10 February 1964 as a suffragan of the Archdiocese of Bangui.
- Lost territory on 18 December 2004 to establish the Diocese of Alindao.

== Statistics ==
As per 2020, the diocese pastorally served 82,500 Catholics (14.2% of 582,500 total population) on 134,284 km^{2} in 14 parishes with 28 priests (24 diocesan, 4 religious), 13 lay religious (5 male, 8 female) and 10 seminarians.

== Ordinaries ==
(all Roman rite, so far European members of Latin congregations)

=== Apostolic Prefect of Bangassou ===
1. Father Martin Bodewes, Holy Ghost Fathers (C.S.Sp.) (4 March 1955 – 10 February 1964)

=== Bishops of Bangassou ===
1. Antoine Marie Maanicus, C.S.Sp. (10 February 1964 – 21 December 2000)
2. Juan José Aguirre, Comboni Missionaries (M.C.C.J.) (21 December 2000 – Present), former Coadjutor Bishop of Bangassou (13 December 1997 – 21 December 2000)

=== Auxiliary Bishop ===
- Jesús Ruiz Molina, M.C.C.J., Titular Bishop of Aræ in Mauretania (11 July 2017 – 10 March 2021), Appointed, Bishop of Mbaïki.

=== Other priest of this diocese who became bishop ===
- Cyr-Nestor Yapaupa (priest in diocese from 18 March 2001 to 18 December 2004), appointed Coadjutor Bishop of Alindao in 2012

== See also ==
- List of Roman Catholic dioceses in the Central African Republic
- Roman Catholicism in the Central African Republic

== Sources and external links ==
- GCatholic.org - data for all sections
