= Baar =

Baar may refer to:

== Places ==
- Baar, Switzerland, a municipality in the Canton of Zug, Switzerland
- Baar, Swabia, a town in western Bavaria, Germany
- Baar, Rhineland-Palatinate, a municipality in Rhineland-Palatinate, Germany
- Baar (region), a region in southern Germany, between the Black Forest and the Swabian Alb
- Baar-Ebenhausen, a municipality in central Bavaria

== People ==
- Baar (surname)
- Count of Baar, Germany
- Fürstenberg-Baar

== Television ==
- Baar (TV series), an Estonian reality television program, based on The Bar Swedish reality competition television franchise

== See also ==
- Bahr (disambiguation)
- Barr (disambiguation)
