= Tabane =

Tabane may refer to:

- Philip Tabane (1934–2018), South African musician
- Tabane, Central African Republic
