= Bahr =

Bahr may refer to:

- Bahr, Central African Republic, village in Haut-Mbomou Prefecture, Central African Republic
- Bahr, Iran, village in Bushehr Province, Iran
- Bahr, village near Straßburg, now: Barr, Bas-Rhin, Alsace, France
- Bahr, Netherlands, hamlet in Gelderland, Netherlands
- Bahr (surname)
- Bahr Winery, winery in California
- Bahr (toponymy), a component of Arabic and Amharic placenames meaning "sea" or "large river"
  - Bahir Dar

== See also ==
- Bähr, a German surname
- Bahrs, a seafood restaurant in New Jersey, US
- Baar (disambiguation)
