= Radio Zereda =

Obo, Haut-Mbomou; Central African Republic
- Broadcast area: Haut-Mbomou
- Frequency: 100.6 MHz

Programming
- Format: Community Radio
- Affiliations: Réseau des Journalistes pour les Droits de l’Homme en Centrafrique

History
- First air date: 17 June 2008

Links
- Website: zereda.wordpress.com

Radio Zereda is a community radio station based in Obo, Haut-Mbomou, Central African Republic. The name Zereda derives from Zande language, meaning peace. The radio station received support from Invisible Children and is part of Réseau des Journalistes pour les Droits de l'Homme en Centrafrique. In 2012, Radio Zereda was popular among the Obo residents and became their main news source.

== History ==
Arthur Zoungagde founded Radio Zereda on 17 June 2008. In the beginning, Radio Zereda coverage only reached 5 km from the station, broadcasting with a homemade transmitter and transmitting antenna from the kapok tree. With assistance from the local community and NGOs, Radio Zereda could air up to 25 km. In 2018, Radio Zereda could reach a radius of up to 150 km. However, Radio Zereda was forced to shut down in 2018 due to dilapidated equipment.

On 29 May 2021, Radio Zereda was on-air again, thanks to the support from the EU-funded RELSUDE program. It also received new equipment from the project. In June 2023, the radio stopped broadcasting due to technical failures. Nevertheless, it started to broadcast again in November after receiving logistical support from the MINUSCA and local authorities, and PONFIL Mbombo technicians resolved the problems.

== Broadcasts ==
In 2012, powered by Solar panels, Radio Zereda broadcast daily from 5:30 pm to 9:00 pm. It was available in two languages: Zande and Sango. The radio station reported daily news from RJDH and relayed Radio Ndeke Luka's broadcast for 30 minutes until 2022. Besides, it also broadcast religion-based programs for Muslims and Christians, music entertainment, message on special events, and public service announcements from ICC. In 2016, Radio Zereda relayed a message from Dominic Ongwen after his defection from LRA.

Radio Zereda had a show that targeted the LRA fighters, Come Home messages. This show was aired three times a week and hosted in Acholi by a former LRA victim. During the show, the host encouraged the LRA fighter to lay down the weapon and return to normal life as well as asked the locals to accept the ex-LRA fighter who wanted to mingle in the community again.
