= Obo Airport =

Obo Airport may refer to:

- Obo Airport (Papua New Guinea) in Obo, Papua New Guinea
- M'Boki Airport in Obo, Central African Republic
- Poste Airport in Obo, Central African Republic
