= St. Peter Claver Cathedral, Bangassou =

St. Peter Claver Cathedral
- Cathédrale Saint Pierre Claver de Bangassou
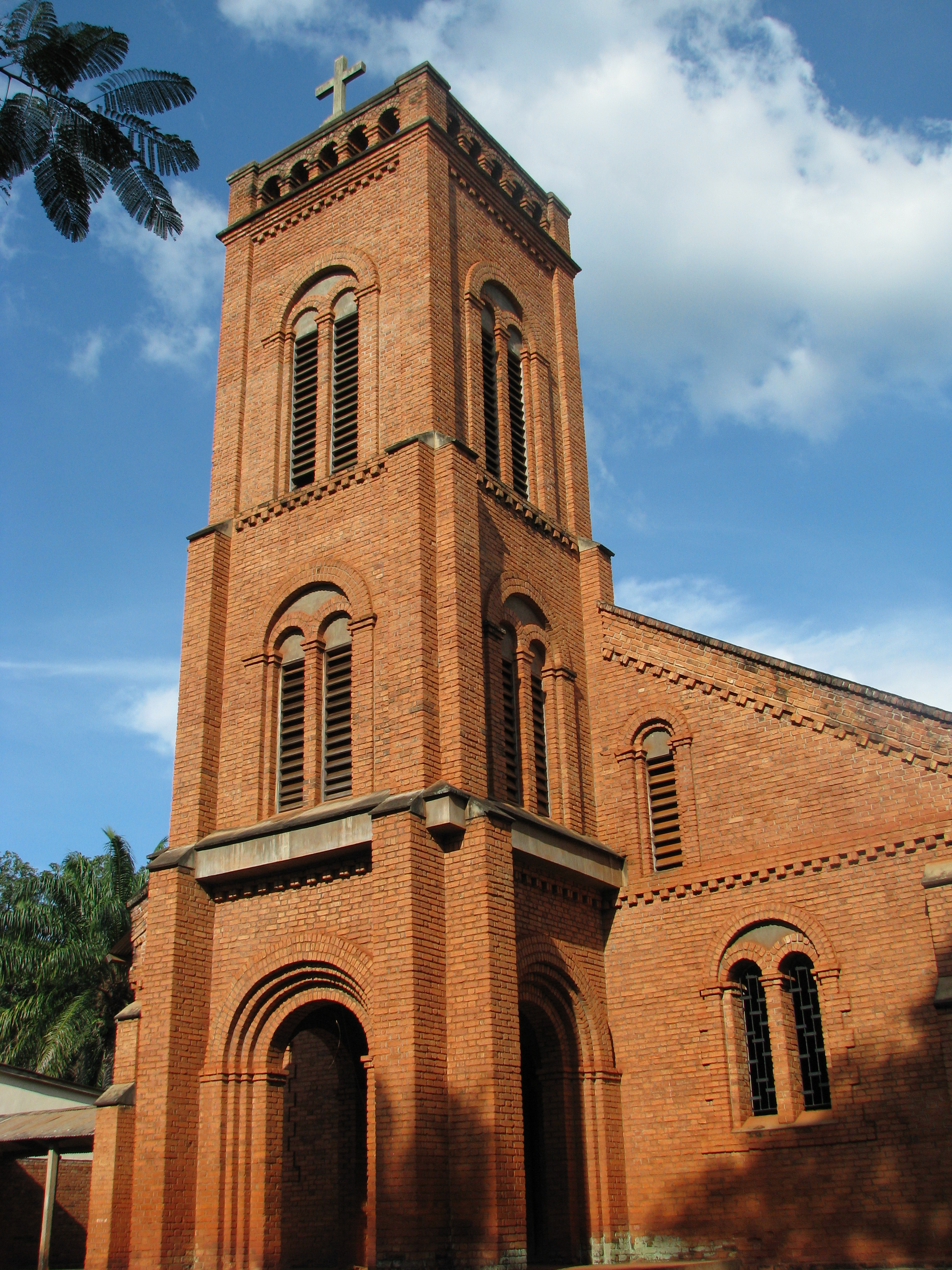
- St. Peter Claver Cathedral
- 4.7464°N 22.8097°E
- Location: Bangassou
- Country: Central African Republic
- Denomination: Roman Catholic Church

The St. Peter Claver Cathedral (French: Cathédrale Saint Pierre Claver de Bangassou) or just Bangassou Cathedral, is a religious building belonging to the Catholic Church and is located in the town of Bangassou part of Mbomou prefecture, south of the Central African Republic.

== History ==
The cathedral is governed by the Roman Catholic or Latin rite and functions as the headquarters of the Roman Catholic Diocese of Bangassou (Dioecesis Bangassuensis) which was created in 1964 by Pope Paul VI with the bull "Quod sacri Evangelii".

It is under the pastoral responsibility of Bishop Juan-José Aguirre Muñoz. It was dedicated in honor of Peter Claver (also written Pedro or Pere Claver), a missionary and Spanish Jesuit priest who is known for his promotion of the rights of slaves in the Spanish colonies in the Americas and was canonized in 1888.

== See also ==
- Roman Catholicism in the Central African Republic
