= Azande Ani Kpi Gbe =

Ethnic militia in the Central African Republic

- Group logo
- Leader: General Limane
- Dates active: 2023–present
- Headquarters: Bambouti
- Active regions: Haut-Mbomou and Mbomou
- Size: 1,000+
- Wars: Central African Republic Civil War
- Website: Azande Ani Kpi Gbe on Facebook

Azande Ani Kpi Gbe ("Too many Azande people have died"), also known as Wagner Ti Azandé, is an ethnic militia of Azande people active in the Haut-Mbomou prefecture of the Central African Republic since March 2023.

== History ==
On 3 March 2023 the group sent a letter demanding resignation of prefect of Haut-Mbomou Prefecture, Jude Ngayako, whom they accused him of colluding with UPC. At this point, the group was based in Bassigbiri village.

On 15 March 2023, Azande Ani Kpi Gbe captured Bambouti from UPC rebels. As a result, UPC withdrew to a place not far from the town.

UPC rebels attacked Azande Ani Kpi Gbe militia in Bambouti to recapture the town on 30 March 2023. Azande self-defense militia managed to repel the attack. Nevertheless, both sides suffered casualties.

Azande Ani Kpi Gbe attacked a FACA military base in Obo on 5 April 2023 as a response to the arrest of its two members. The attack lasted for twenty minutes and the militia withdrew from the city. They claimed that the attack was a warning to the government.

The South Sudanese army attacked a Azande Ani Kpi Gbe position in Bambouti on 23 April 2023. Azande Ani Kpi Gbe militia repelled the attack and both warring parties suffered casualties.

Azandé Ani Kpi Gbé militia attacked a UPC position 10 kilometers from Mboki on 7 May 2023 after hearing of the disappearance of a Fulani herder, which the militia blamed on the rebels. This forced the town residents to seek refuge at the Catholic church. On 8 May 2023, the clash between Azandé Ani Kpi Gbé and UPC reached Mboki downtown and Azande militia controlled 80% of the town. Later, the Azandé militia retreated 7 km from Mboki after MINUSCA forced them to withdraw.

UPC attacked Azande Ani Kpi Gbe militia on 23 May 2023 in Kadjéma. The battle lasted for two hours and UPC captured the village. Due to the attack, the villagers fled to the bush.

Azandé Ani Kpi Gbé attacked the UPC position in Mboki for the second time on 15 June 2023. Although UPC repelled the attack, Azandé Ani Kpi Gbé militia remained on the town's outskirts, and the residents fled to the field and bush near Mboki. It was estimated that 40 people were dead from both warring parties, and four civilians were killed.

Wagner trained Azandé Ani Kpi Gbé militia in March 2024. The training ended on 1 May, and around 100 militiamen joined FACA. Azandé Ani Kpi Gbé is allegedly participated in February 2025 Azande-Balanda ethnic conflict in Western Equatoria.

On 6 October 2024, AAKG attacked Dembia, making its first attack outside Haut-Mbomou.
