= Poste Airport =

- IATA: none; ICAO: FEFB

Summary
- Airport type: Public
- Serves: Obo, Central African Republic
- Elevation AMSL: 2,137 ft / 651 m
- Coordinates: 5°24′16″N 26°29′15″E

Map
- Location of Poste Airport in the Central African Republic

Runways
Direction	Length		Surface
Direction	m	ft	Surface
04/22	640	2,100	Grass
- Source: Landings.com Google Maps GCM

Poste Airport (ICAO: FEFB) is an airport serving Obo, a town in the Haut-Mbomou prefecture of the Central African Republic. The airport is on the northwest corner of the town.

== See also ==
- Transport in the Central African Republic
- List of airports in the Central African Republic
