= Henri Pouzère =

Central African politician

Minister of Posts, Telecommunications, and New Technologies
- In office 3 February 2013 – 27 January 2014
- President: François Bozizé; Michel Djotodia
- Preceded by: Abdou Karim Meckassoua
- Succeeded by: Abdallah Kadre Hassan

Personal details
- Born: December 27, 1938 Yétomane, Ouaka, Ubangi-Shari (now the present-day Central African Republic)
- Died: 25 February 2018 (aged 79) Saint-Denis, France
- Spouse: Rosalie Pouzère
- Education: University of Sorbonne-Paris I

Henri Pouzère (27 December 1938 – 25 February 2018) was a Central African politician and lawyer. He was appointed to the government of the Central African Republic as Minister of Posts and Telecommunications in 2013.

== Early life ==
Pouzère was born on 27 December 1938 in a village near Ippy, Yétomane. He graduated from Collège Émile Gentil in 1960. Subsequently, he continued his education at Lycée Savorgnan de Brazza in Brazzaville through a Ministry of Education scholarship and finished it in 1961. Pouzère then studied political science at University of Sorbonne-Paris I. Afterward, he lived in Gabon in the mid-1980s and joined the bar association in Libreville.

== Political career ==
Pouzère ran in both the September 1999 and March 2005 presidential elections as an independent candidate, receiving 4.19% of the vote in 1999 and 2.10% in 2005. In the concurrent 2005 parliamentary election, he also ran for a seat in the National Assembly from Ippy, but was defeated by Yvonne Ndjapou.

As of 2007, Pouzère was coordinator of the Union of the Active Forces of the Nation (UFVN) opposition coalition.

Following a rebellion in December 2012, a national unity government was appointed on 3 February 2013, composed of supporters of President François Bozizé, the opposition, and rebels. Pouzère was appointed to the government as Minister of Posts, Telecommunications, and New Technologies. After Bozizé was ousted by the rebels in March 2013, Pouzère was retained as Minister of Posts and Telecommunications in the next government, appointed on 31 March 2013.

== Death ==
Pouzère died in Saint-Denis on 25 February 2018. His funeral was held on 19 March 2018 in Bangui, attended by Faustin-Archange Touadéra.

Pouzère played a key role within the opposition group (UFVN), and he ran for president on many occasions. The incumbent President Faustin-Archange Touadéra, who participated in Pouzère’s formal funeral ceremony in 2018, will run for re-election in the coming 2025 election cycle.
