= Gambo-Ouango =

- Sub-prefecture and town
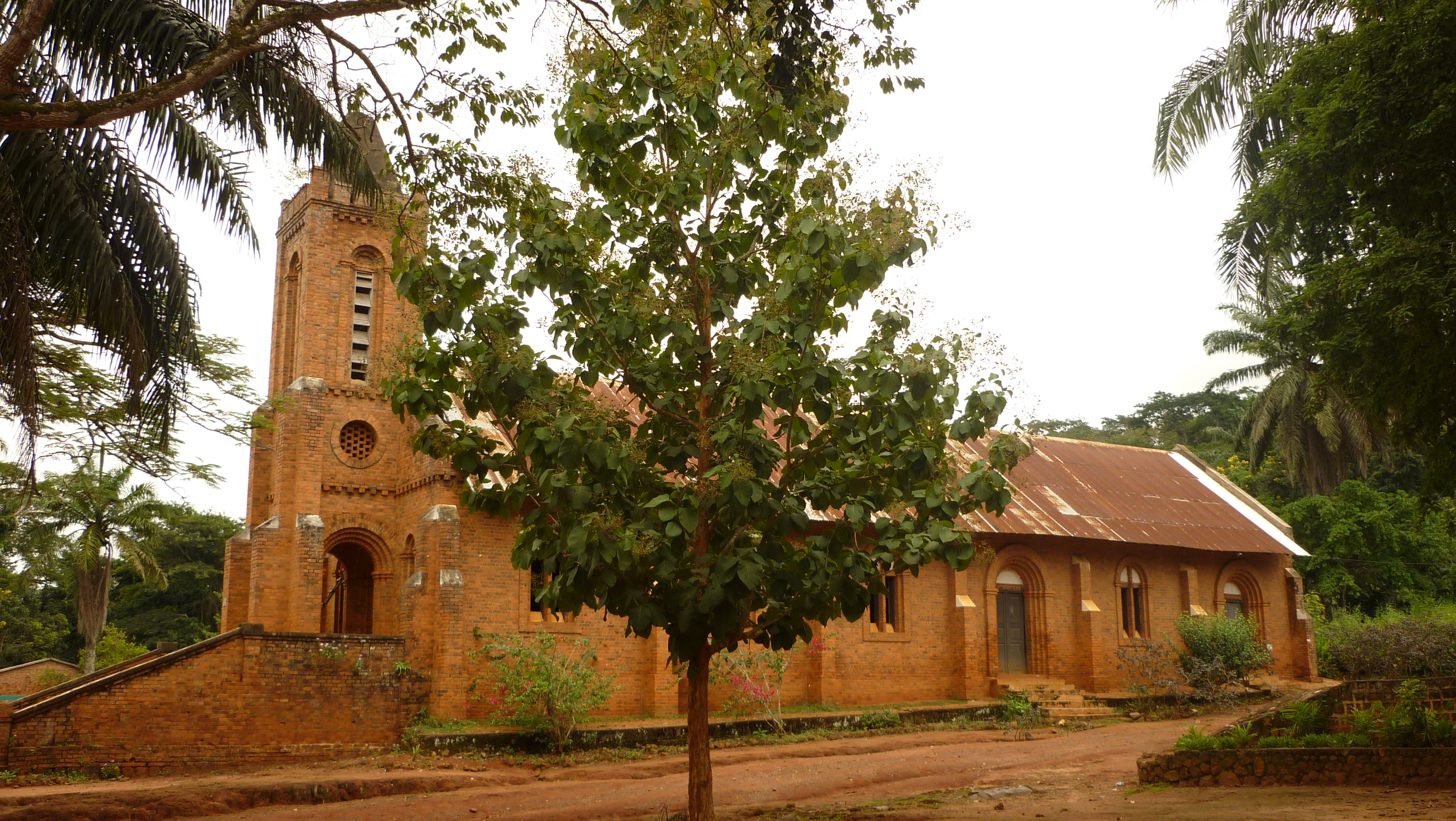
- Parish of St. George, Ouango.

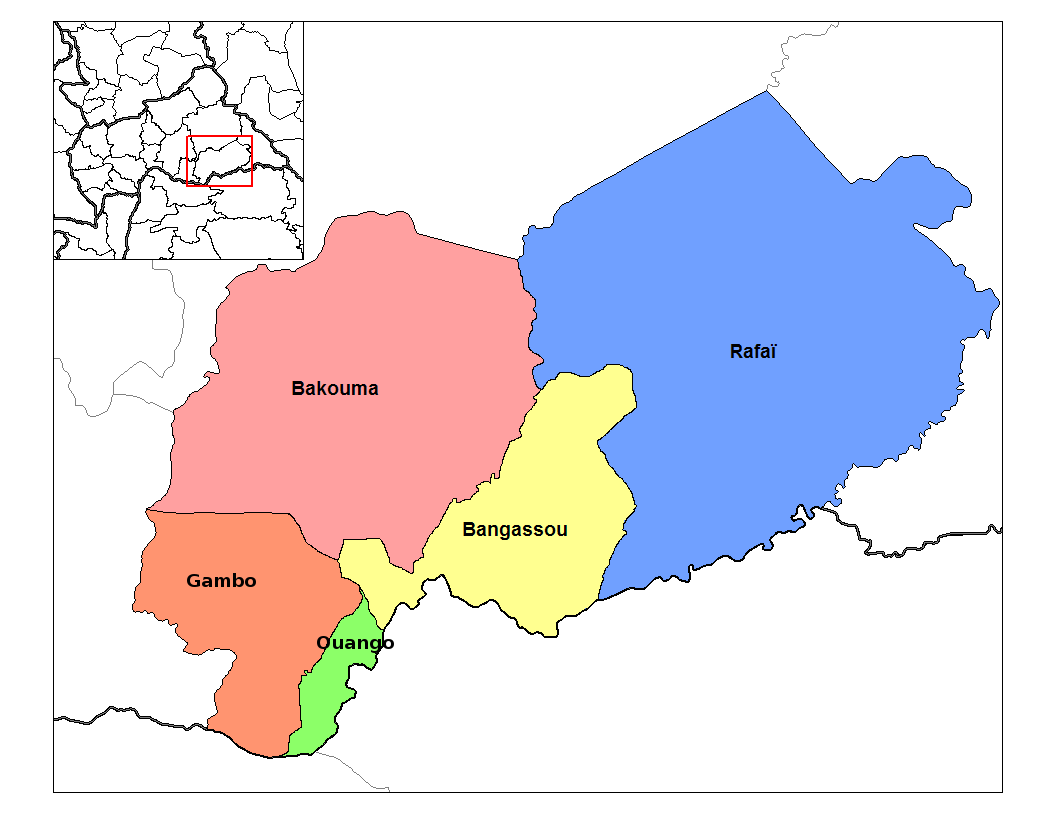
- Sub-prefectures of Mbomou

- Location in the Central African Republic
- Coordinates: 4°8′N 22°15′E
- Country: Central African Republic
- Prefecture: Mbomou
- Capital: Gambo
- Time zone: UTC+1 (WAT)

Gambo-Ouango is a sub-prefecture in the Mbomou Prefecture of the south-eastern Central African Republic.
