= Tabane, Central African Republic =

Tabane
- Location in Central African Republic
- Coordinates: 5°5′29″N 24°59′24″E
- Country: Central African Republic
- Prefecture: Haut-Mbomou
- Sub-prefecture: Zemio
- Commune: Zemio

Tabane is a village located in Haut-Mbomou Prefecture, Central African Republic.

== History ==
On 5 March 2016, LRA splinter group commander by Doctor Achaye attacked Tabane. Two people were killed and 12 civilians were kidnapped. Several houses were razed to the ground and the militias also looted civilians' properties. As a result, Tabane residents took refuge in Zemio.

On 19 September 2016, LRA raided Tabane. The raid displaced 700 civilians.

An alleged UPC rebels killed three people in Tabane on 13 or 14 April 2024. Later, the locals founded the victim's bodies in the bush.

FACA clashed with UPC in Tabane in July or August 2024. An armed group attacked MINUSCA patrols in the village on 29 March 2025, killing one Kenyan soldier.

== Healthcare ==
Tabane has one health post.
