= Baar (surname) =

Baar (German pronunciation: [ˈbaːɐ̯]) is a German surname. Notable people with the surname include:

- Arnold R. Baar (1891–1954), American judge
- Arthur Baar (1890–1984), Austrian head of SC Hakoah Wien
- Hein de Baar (born 1949), Dutch oceanographer
- Jindřich Šimon Baar (1869–1925), Czech writer, clergy
- Roland Baar (born 1965), German sportsman
- T. Baar, managing director of the Continental Wondergraph Company, a cinema chain established in Australia in 1910
- Tim Baar (1912–1977), American special effects artist
