= Hein de Baar =

Dutch academic

Henricus "Hein" J.W. de Baar (born 18 November 1949, The Hague) is a Dutch professor of Oceanography. He has worked in the group of Harry Elderfield at the University of Cambridge, at the University of Groningen and at the Royal Netherlands Institute of Sea Research (NIOZ).

De Baar studied chemical technology at Delft University of Technology (1977), after which he obtained his PhD in chemical oceanography (marine chemistry) from the WHOI-MIT Joint Program in Oceanography (1983). His thesis supervisor was Peter Brewer.

He has worked at the Royal Netherlands Institute for Sea Research (NIOZ) since 1987, where he was a senior scientist. He became a full professor at the University of Groningen in 1992. He formally retired in November 2014. De Baar was elected into the Royal Netherlands Academy of Arts and Sciences (KNAW) in 2010.

De Baar has supported the farming of algae for biofuel and has warned about the speed at which ocean acidification intensifies.

De Baar is globally well recognised for his expertise. In 2009, Nature quoted him as follows: "Ocean iron fertilization is simply no longer to be taken as a viable option for mitigation of the CO2 problem."

The high-ranking scientific journal Marine Chemistry dedicated an issue to him and described him as "a chemical oceanographer who investigated the oceans with the conviction that only true integration of biology, chemistry, and physics is pivotal to understand the inner workings of the oceans. He was one of the initiators of the Joint Global Ocean Flux Study (JGOFS) and of GEOTRACES."
