= Mboki =

- Sub-prefecture and town
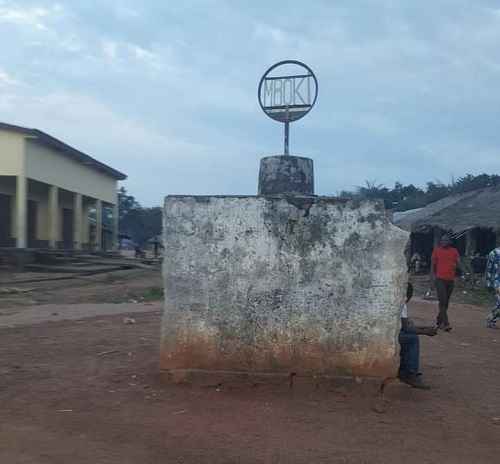
- Mboki in 2023

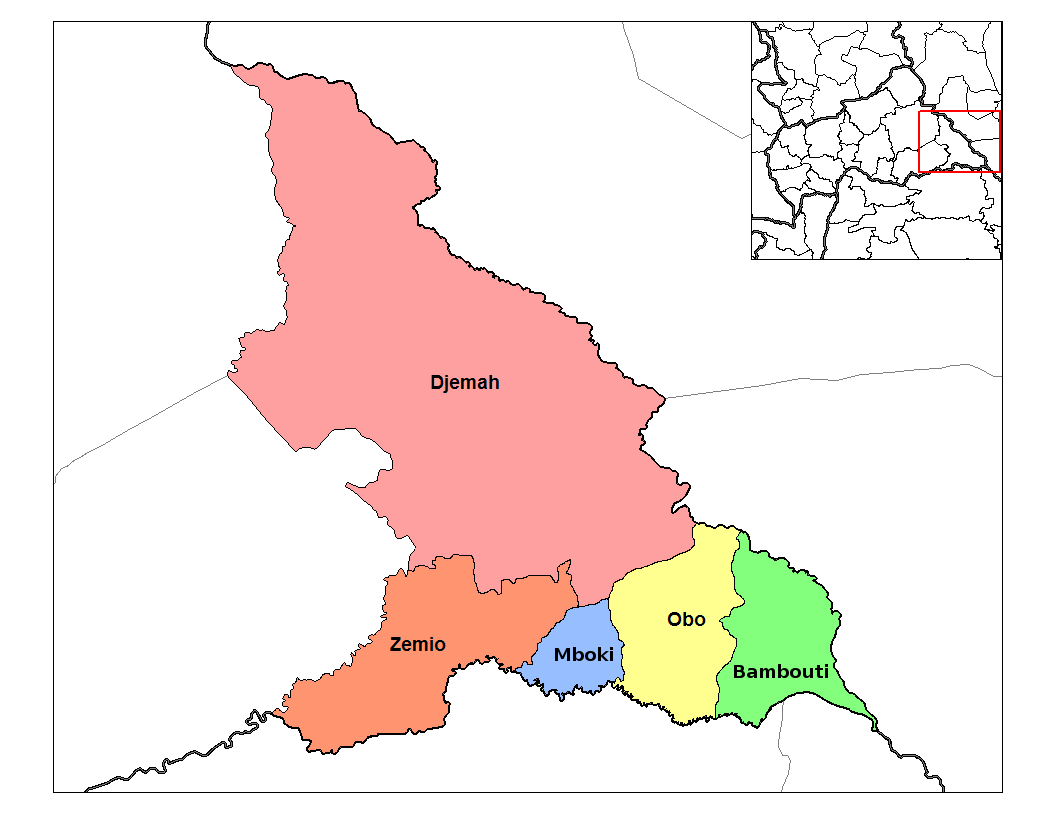
- Sub-prefectures of Haut-Mbomou

- Location in the Central African Republic
- Coordinates: 5.316°N 25.9571°E
- Country: Central African Republic
- Prefecture: Haut-Mbomou

Government
  - Sub-Prefect: Christian Jonas Kadayombo
  - Mayor: Léa Patah

Population (2014)
  - Total: 10,000
- Time zone: UTC+1 (WAT)

Mboki is a town and sub-prefecture in the Haut-Mbomou prefecture of the south-eastern Central African Republic.

== History ==
=== Sub-prefecture ===
On 16 March 1968, the Mboki sub-prefecture was established and later it was abolished on 14 February 1984 due to unknown circumstances. However, Mboki regained the status of sub-prefecture.

=== LRA Insurgency ===
On 24 July 2009, 13 LRA fighters commanded by Colonel Acellam Smart attacked Mboki. They looted the town's market and killed five civilians. However, when they killed 11 years old boy, 200 Mboki self-defence force fighters armed with arrows and machetes attacked the militias. The self-defense group managed to kill three and injure three LRA fighters. As a result, LRA retreated and escaped to the bush. While hiding in the bush, three injured LRA fighters soon died.

On 20 and 21 March 2010, LRA attacked Mboki. They abducted six people and killed the chief of Mboki 3 neighborhood.

=== Central African Republic Civil War ===
Until mid-2017 Mboki was not affected by Central African Republic Civil War. In June 2017 presence of Union for Peace in the Central African Republic (UPC) fighters and incursions by self-defense groups from Bangassou was reported in the town. On 25 June three soldiers were killed in Mboki. As of April 2021 Mboki remains under control of UPC armed group.

Azandé Ani Kpi Gbé militia attacked UPC position 10 kilometers from Mboki on 7 May 2023 after hearing the disappearance of a Fulani herder, for which the militia blamed the rebels for it. This forced the town residents to seek refuge at the catholic church. On 8 May 2023, the clash between Azandé Ani Kpi Gbé and UPC reached Mboki downtown and Azande militia controlled 80% of the town. Later, the Azandé militia retreated 7 km from Mboki after MINUSCA forced them to withdraw.

Azandé Ani Kpi Gbé attacked the UPC position in Mboki for the second time on 15 June 2023. Although UPC repelled the attack, Azandé Ani Kpi Gbé militia remained on the town's outskirts, and the residents fled to the field and bush near Mboki. It was estimated that 40 people were dead from both warring parties, and four civilians were killed.

The town was attacked again by Azandé Ani Kpi Gbé on 29 August 2023. Casualties were reported on both sides. In September 2023 armed forces and MINUSCA peacekeepers were deployed in Mboki.

FACA and Wagner mercenaries captured Mboki from UPC on 25 May 2024 after a brief clash.

== Healthcare ==
Mboki has one health center.

== Transport ==
The town is served by M'Boki Airport.
