= Bambouti =

- sub-prefectures and town
- Location in Central African Republic
- Coordinates: 5°23′38″N 27°12′21″E
- Country: Central African Republic
- Prefecture: Haut-Mbomou
- Control: Azande Ani Kpi Gbe

Government
  - Sub-Prefect: Koumba Ndiaye
  - Mayor: Anne-Marie Sioukarani

Bambouti is a sub-prefecture of Haut-Mbomou in the Central African Republic. The town is abandoned by the country.

== Geography ==
It is located on the RN2 national road 110 km east of the capital of Haut-Mbomou: Obo, near the border between the Central African Republic and South Sudan.

== History ==
On May 2, 2002, the locality is erected in chief town of sub-prefecture of Haut-Mbomou, by the separation of the eastern part of the sub-prefecture of Obo. At the end of 2015, the locality receives refugees from South Sudan, nearby.

=== Central African Republic Civil War (2012-present) ===
In October 2019 armed group Union for Peace in the Central African Republic took control of Bambouti. Later, the Lord's Resistance Army took control of the area.

On 8 November 2020, in response to UPC incursion into South Sudanese territory, an armed group from South Sudan led by James Nando attacked Bambouti and killed two UPC members. Afterward, the armed group withdrew to South Sudan and UPC regained control of the town. In response to the attack, UPC kidnapped Bambouti's mayor.

On 15 March 2023, a self-defense militia group named Azande Ani Kpi Gbe captured Bambouti from UPC rebels. As a result, UPC withdrew to a place not far from the town. UPC rebels attacked Azande Ani Kpi Gbe militia in Bambouti to recapture the town on 30 March 2023. Azande self-defense militia managed to repel the attack. Nevertheless, both sides suffered casualties. South Sudan Army attacked Azande Ani Kpi Gbe position in Bambouti on 23 April 2023. Azande Ani Kpi Gbe militia repelled the attack and both warring parties suffered casualties.

MINUSCA deployed its forces to Bambouti on 8 May 2024. AAKG militia attacked Bambouti on 28 December 2025. Less than an hour, AAKG militia seized the town, and FACA soldiers fled either to Source Yubu or the MINUSCA base. The militia also took hostage the sub-prefect. FACA and Wagner recaptured the town on 1 January 2026 morning.

== Economy ==
The locals heavily depend on South Sudan for supplies, and the South Sudanese pound is more widely used than the CFA.

== Education ==
There is a school in Bambouti. In 2022, COOPI rehabilitated the school, replacing the school's roof from thatched to tin. However, no qualified teachers are present in the town, and the school employs parent teachers instead. This situation led some students to go to South Sudan for education.

== Healthcare ==
Bambouti has one health center. However, many locals depend on traditional medicine.

== Security ==
As of November 2023, no security apparatus exists in Bambouti. The town used to have a gendarmerie post until it got destroyed by the LRA. Since then, there has not been any reconstruction of the post.

== Transport ==
The road connecting to Bambouti is in deplorable condition. Since the country's independence, no road maintenance has ever been carried out.
