= Djemah =

- Sub-prefecture and town
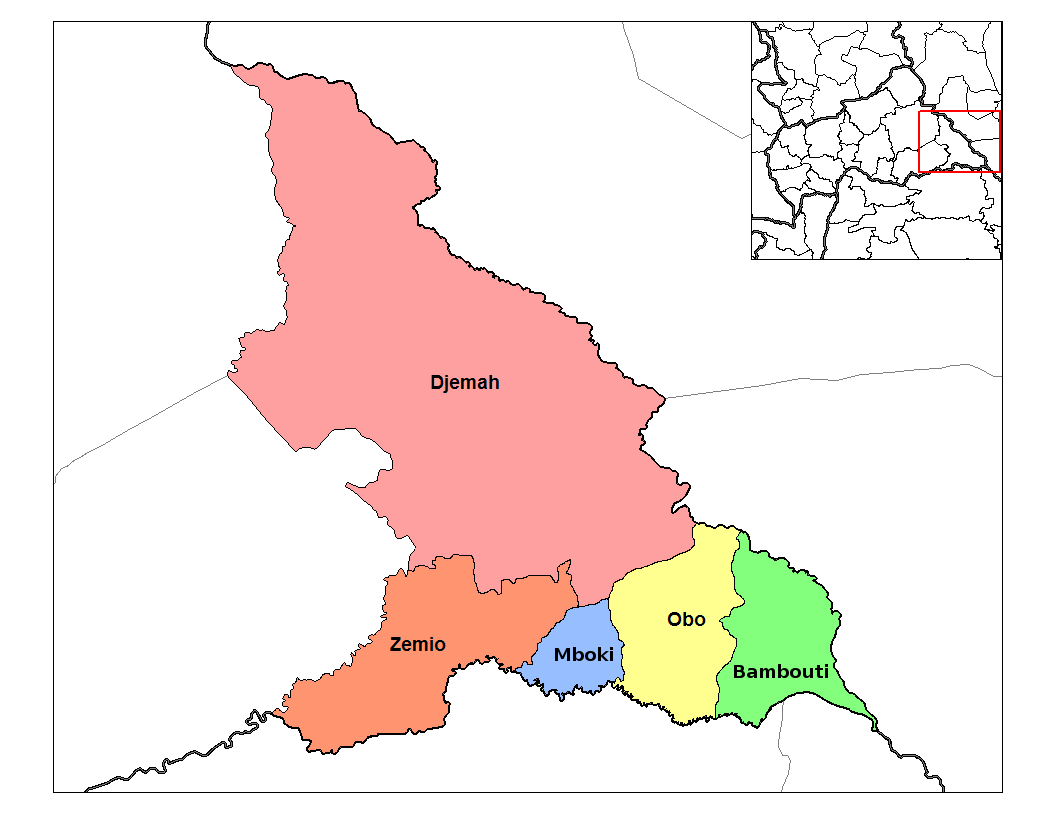
- Sub-prefectures of Haut-Mbomou

- Location in the Central African Republic
- Coordinates: 6°3′N 25°19′E
- Country: Central African Republic
- Prefecture: Haut-Mbomou

Government
  - Sub-Prefect: Jean Louis Lengue Omo
  - Mayor: Catherine Toumokpio
- Time zone: UTC+1 (WAT)

Djemah is a town and sub-prefecture in the Haut-Mbomou Prefecture of the south-eastern Central African Republic. It is the least-populous sub-prefecture in the country. The town is largely neglected by the central government since the country gained independence from France in 1960.

== Etymology ==
The town is named after local chief Djemah, who was accused of murder by French colonial officials and executed in Bangui in 1914.

== History ==
Djemah was founded as a French colonial post in March 1897.

On 5 October 2009, 60 LRA fighters led by Major Olanya attacked Djemah to obtain food and kidnap the locals. As they arrived at the town, they shot in the air to warn the town residents, thus leading them to flee the town and alert the Ugandan soldiers who had arrived in Djemah last night. The looting lasted for one hour, and later, the Ugandan forces arrived at the town. Realizing the presence of UPDF, the LRA militias fled to the forest, and the Ugandan troops chased them. During the pursuit, a clash happened between two belligerents, resulting in the death of around 25 LRA members. The looting was unsuccessful, and in retaliation, three abductees were executed by the LRA.

On 25 May 2024, armed forces returned to Djmeah after clashing with UPC rebels. From 30 April to 1 May 2026, an armed group attacked the Fouka neighborhood, looting and burning houses and abducting five people. Due to the attack, Djemah residents fled to the bush.

== Economy ==
Due to the remoteness of the location, the locals relied on hunting, gathering and fishing for their livelihood.

== Education ==
Schools exist in the town. However, there is no teacher in the town, so the children do not get an education.

== Healthcare ==
Djemah has one health center. However, many of the town residents are very dependent on traditional medicine since there is no doctor and qualified nurses.

== Gallery ==
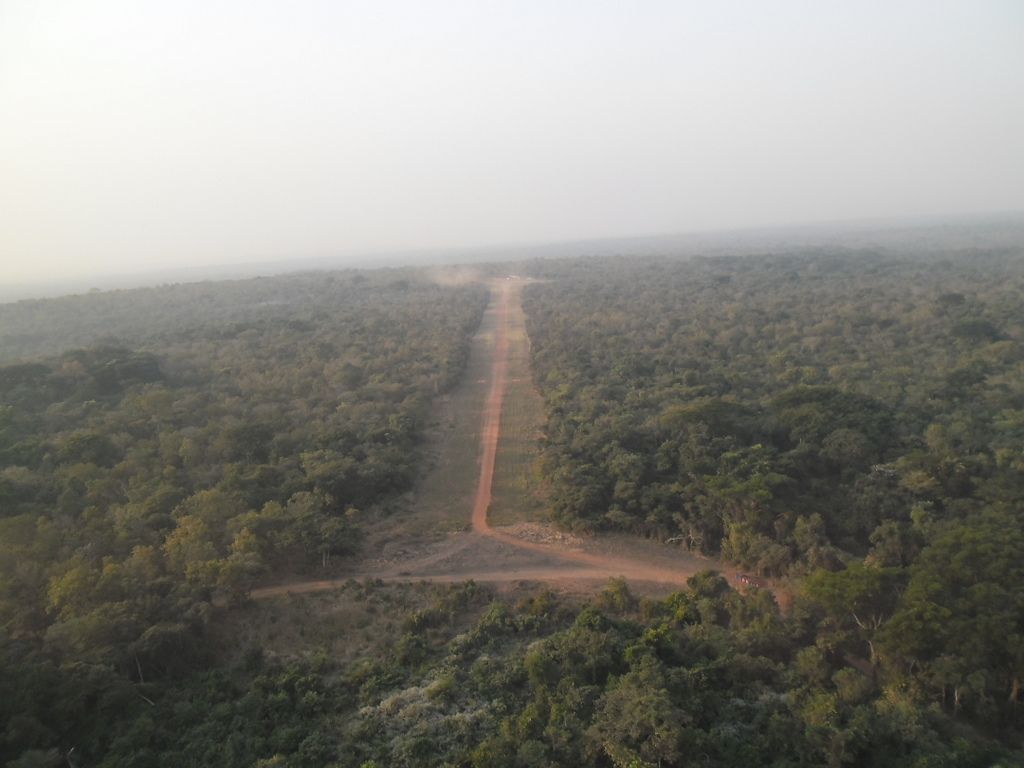
The airfield located to the south of the town of Djemah.

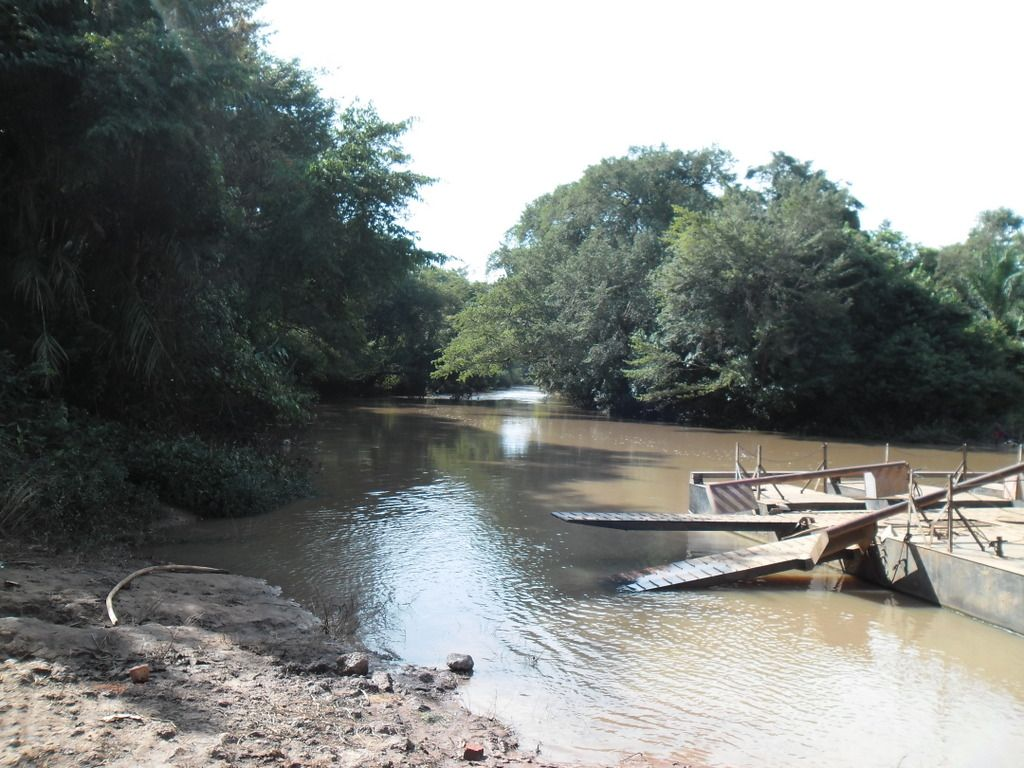
The ferry which crosses the river to the north of Djemah.
