= Obo =

- City
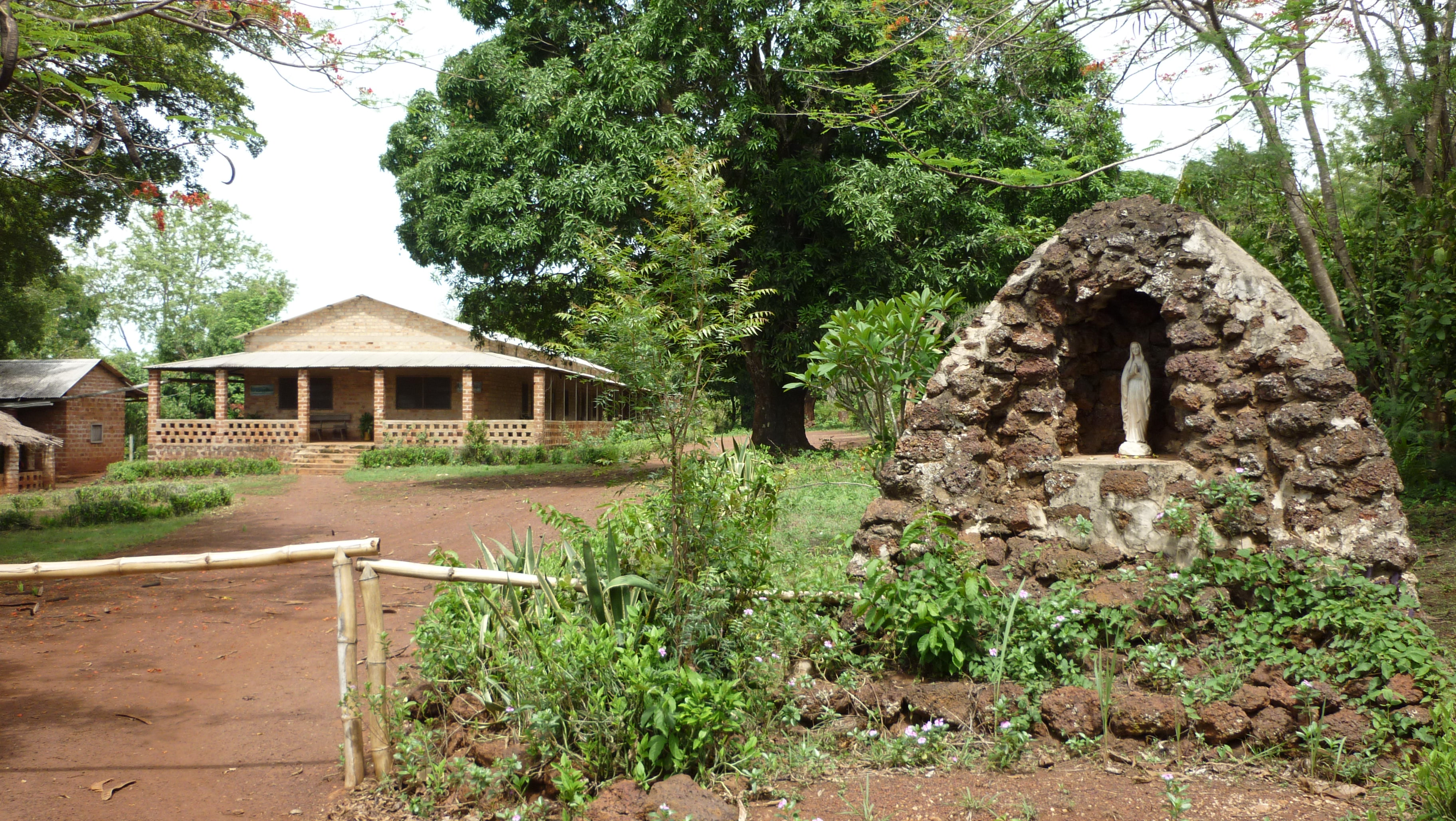
- The Catholic mission at Obo

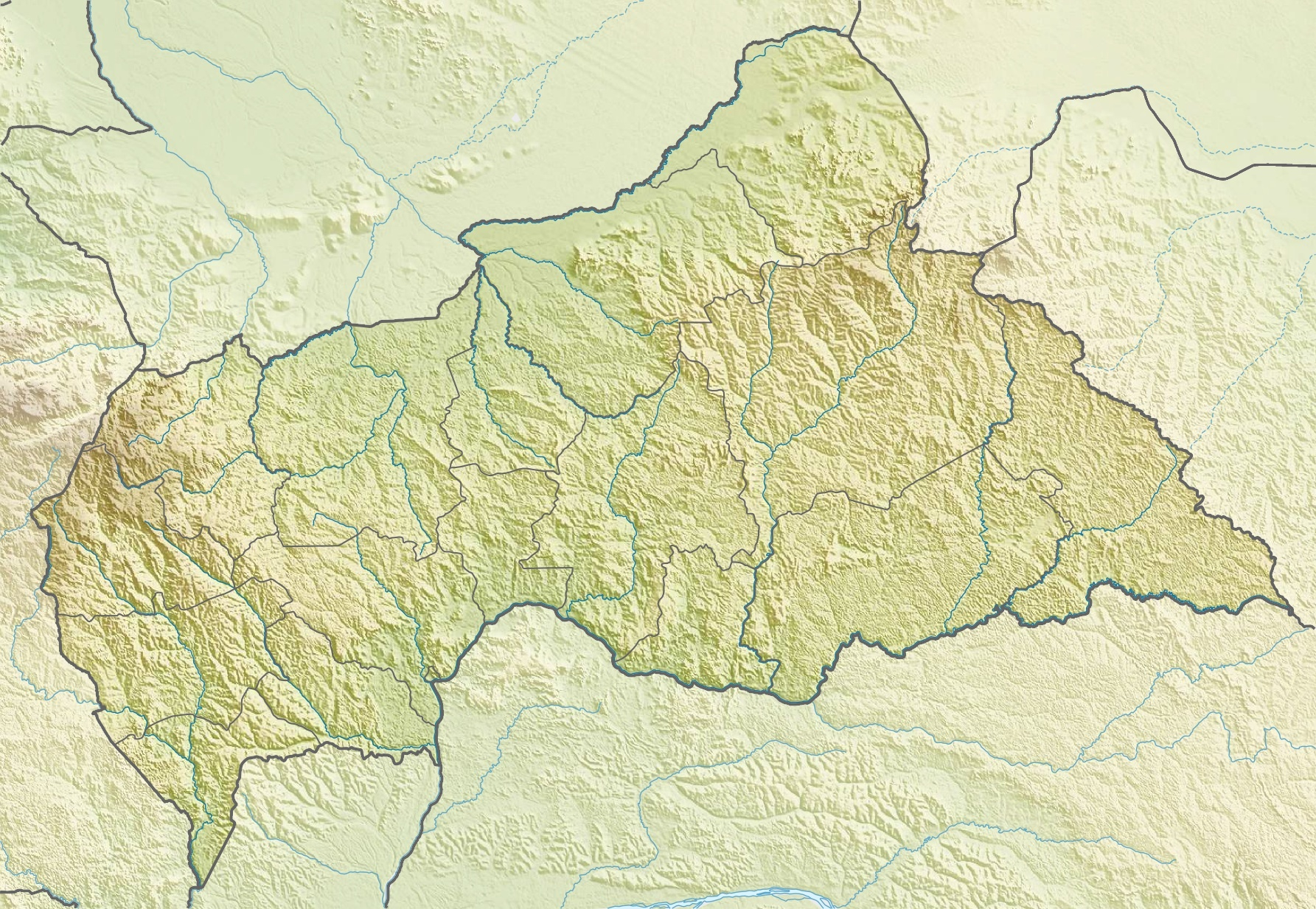
- Location in Central African Republic Obo (Africa)
- Coordinates: 5°24′N 26°30′E
- Country: Central African Republic
- Prefecture: Haut-Mbomou

Government
  - Sub-Prefect: Roger Sodji
  - Mayor: Mireille Ndosse
- Elevation: 2,116 ft (645 m)

Population (2003)
  - Total: 7,187
- Time zone: UTC+01:00 (WAT)

Obo is the capital of Haut-Mbomou, one of the 20 prefectures of the Central African Republic. It is close to the African Pole of Inaccessibility, the point of the continent furthest from the sea, about 1,814 km (1,127 mi) from the coast.

== History ==
Obo was named after the local Zande chief Ogbo, with the spelling changed slightly in later years. Ogbo ruled the territory between the Mbokou and Kamou rivers. However, a conflict emerged when nearby Chief Gougbéré annexed much of Ogbo's territory on the pretext that the inhabitants were from the same ethnic group as him. Ogbo petitioned Sultan Zémio, who was his first cousin once removed, to help, but the sultan did not intervene. Ogbo then asked French colonial captain Maurice Martin to mediate in 1910. Martin sided with Ogbo's land claims, but said that any new settlements should be allowed to remain.

French military general Jean Baptiste Marchand passed through the area on his journey to find the source of the Nile. When he failed to find access to the river, the settlement became a cul-de-sac and he moved on in a different direction.

The Africa Inland Mission established a presence in the town in 1925 with the Linquist family, who came from Zemio. It was one of a number of evangelical missions among the Zande areas of Ubangi-Shari and the Belgian Congo.

On the night of 5 March 2008, Obo witnessed the first LRA's attack. The group attacked the AIM neighborhood and abducted 73 residents.

=== Central African Republic Civil War (2012-present) ===
On 24 May 2013, 40-80 Arrow Boys militias from South Sudan attacked Obo. The attack was foiled and 29 militias were captured. They were put into prison of Obo Gendarmerie and seven of them died on the first day of their imprisonment.

On 9 May 2020 armed forces repelled an attack by the Union for Peace in the Central African Republic armed group on Obo, killing 11 militants. They repelled another attack on 18 May and another on 20 May, killing 12 militants. Between 26 and 27 July 2021, government forces repelled another attack on Obo by rebel groups affiliated with the Coalition of Patriots for Change. One Central African Armed Forces soldier was killed. With their town severely damaged by the attack, the residents of Obo organized a mass protest over MINUSCA's ineffectiveness at preventing violence in the area.

Azande Ani Kpi Gbe attacked FACA military base in Obo on 5 April 2023 as a response to the arrest of its two members. The attack lasted for twenty minutes and the militia withdrew from the city. They claimed that the attack was a warning to the government. On 13 August 2023, Azande Ani Kpi Gbe kidnapped a Muslim resident in the town, thus resulting in a clash between FACA and the militia. One Azande milia was wounded and at night, several shops in the town were burned.

On 4 June 2026, it was reported that two days prior a senior member of the MINUSCA-supervised peace committee for Haut-Mbomou had been murdered with machetes; while the perpetrators were as of then unknown, the Corbeau News newsroom suggested that they were Azande militiamen.

== Healthcare ==
The town hosts the only hospital in Haut Mbomou Prefecture, Hôpital Préfectoral de Obo. Besides that, Obo has one health center run by the Centre Médicale Evangélique de Obo, ex AIM.

== Media ==
The town has one radio which is Radio Zereda.

== Transport ==
The Poste Airport (now closed) is located near to the prefecture in town. The current airport was constructed in the early 1980s by the Africa Inland Mission - AIM.

== Gallery ==
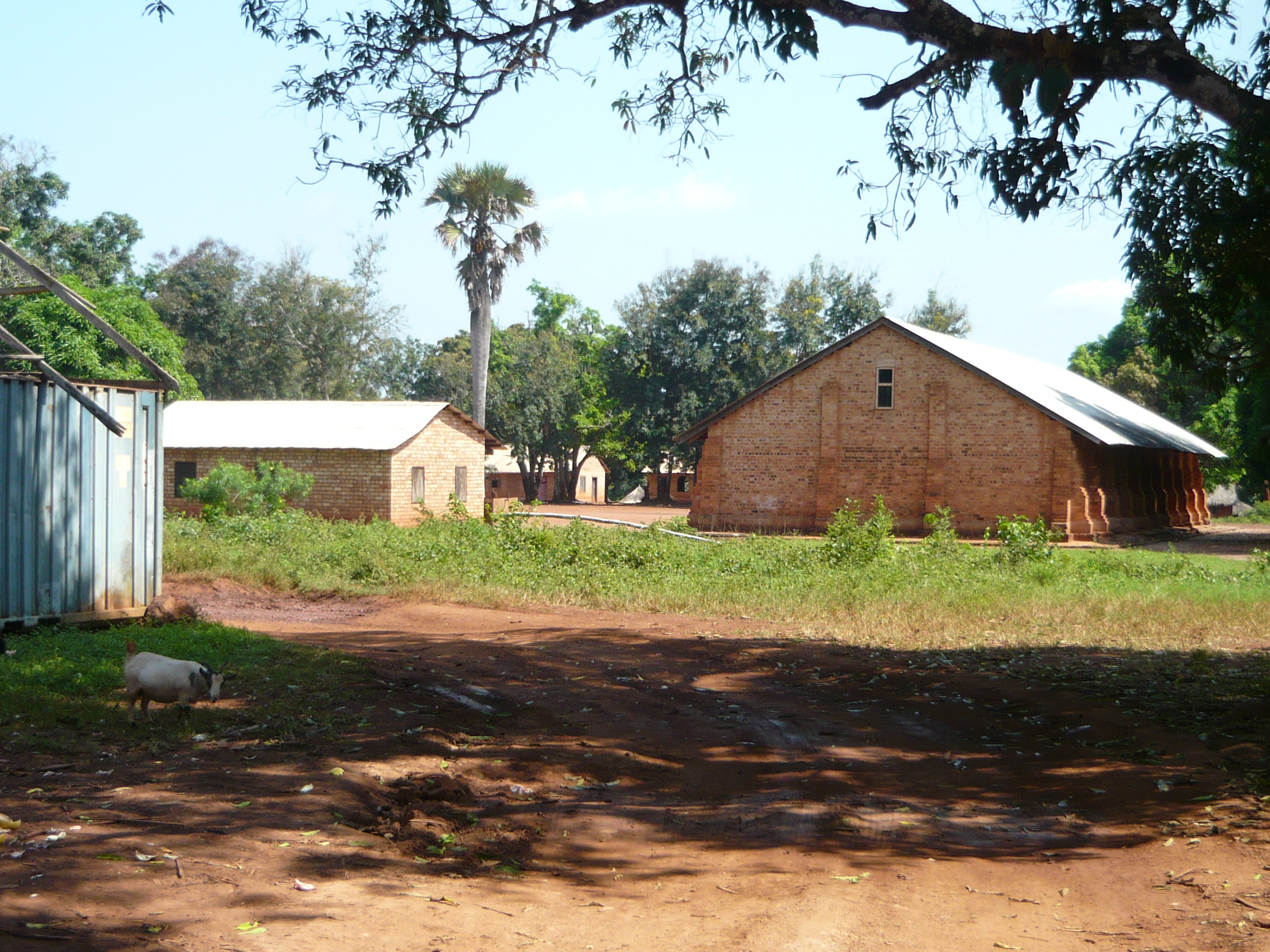
The Protestant mission (ex AIM) at Obo, as seen from the rear.

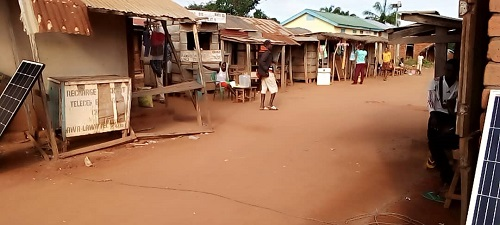
Lakouanga Market

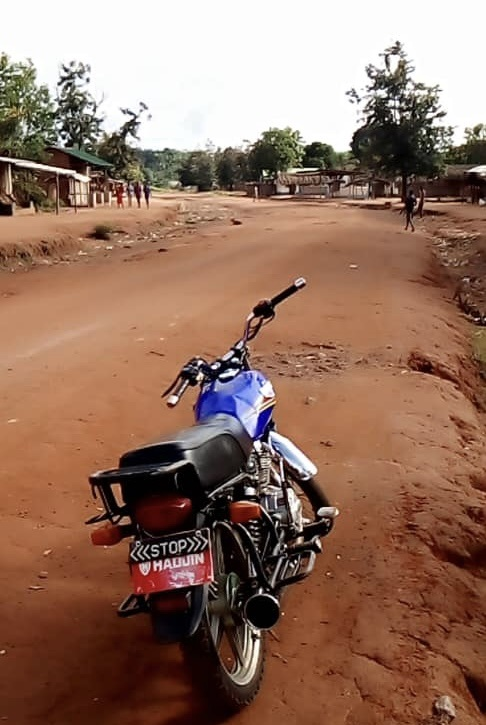
A motorcycle in Obo

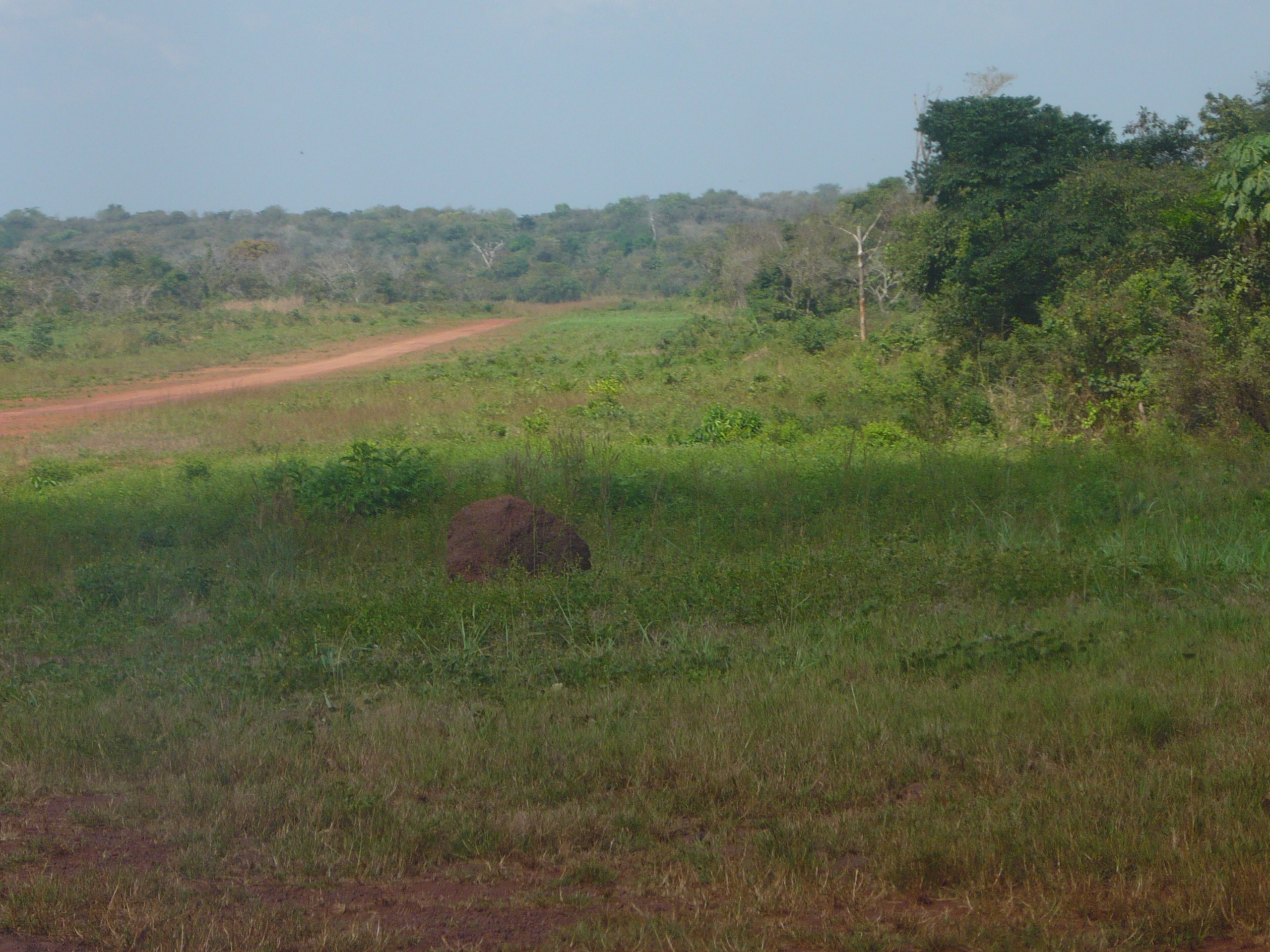
The Obo Airfield (AIM) at the start of the dry season.
