= Bangassou =

Place in Central African Republic

- City
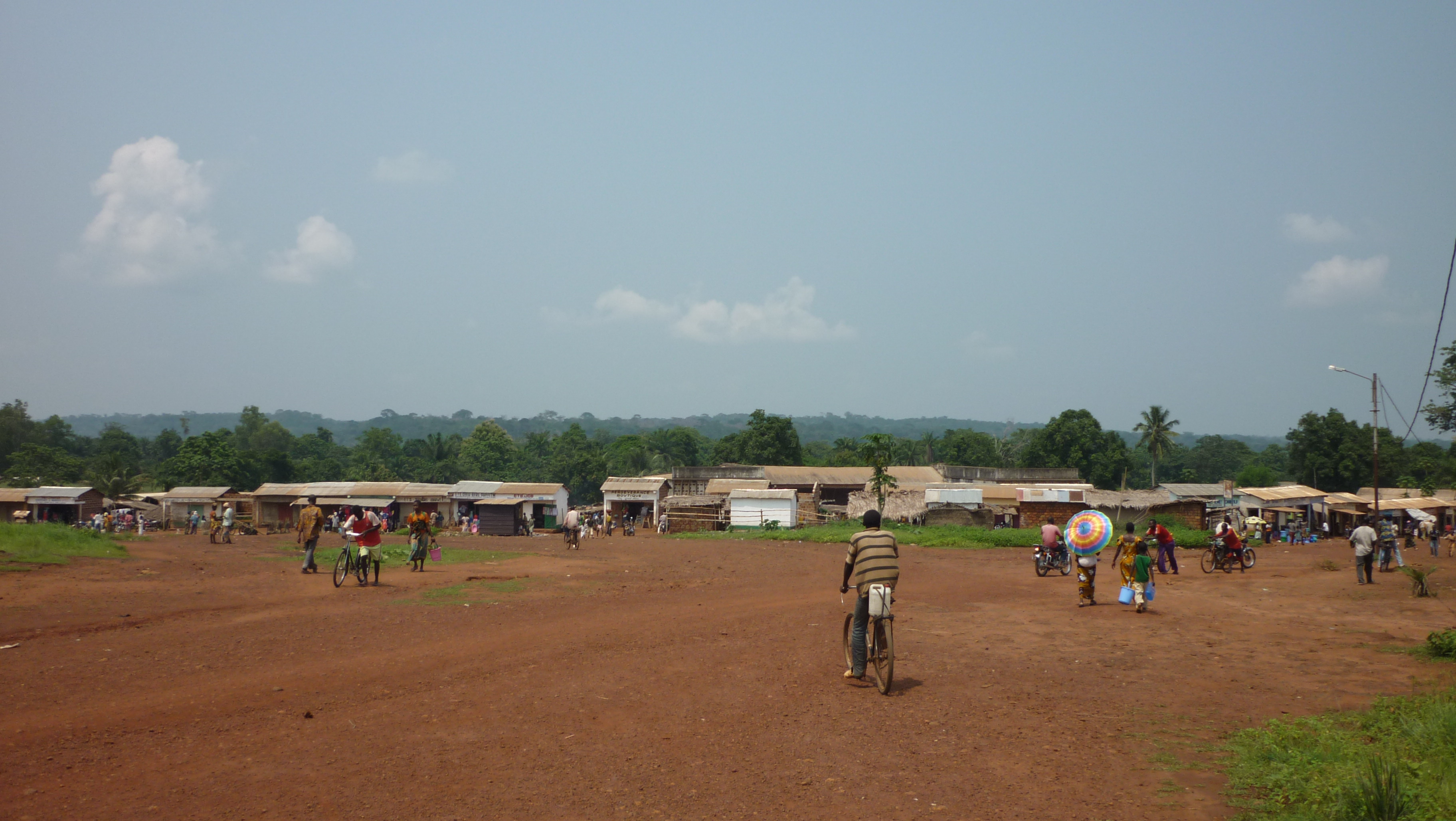
- Central market in Bangassou

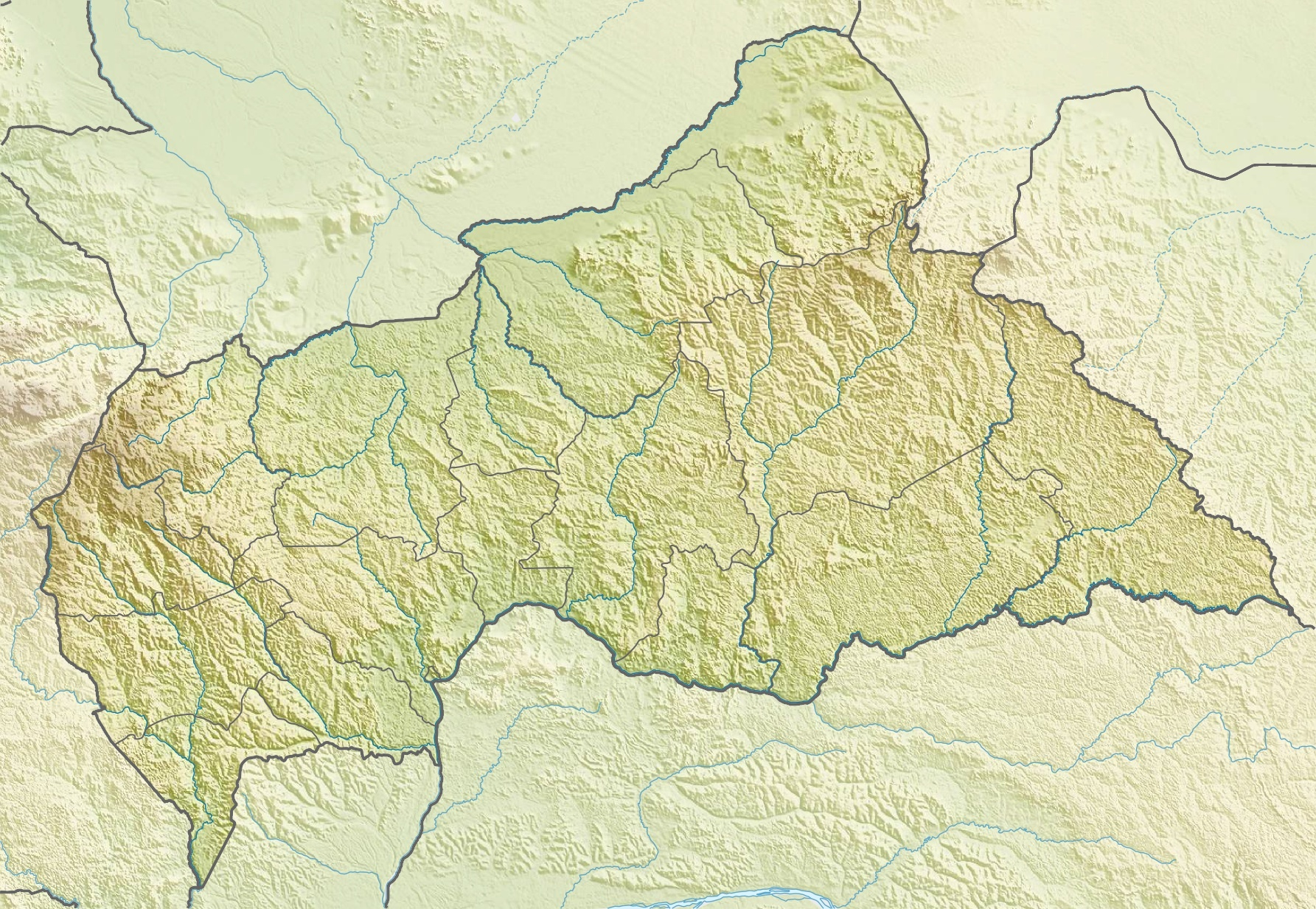
- Location in Central African Republic
- Coordinates: 4°44′16″N 22°48′59″E
- Country: Central African Republic
- Prefecture: Mbomou

Government
  - Sub-Prefect: Bertin Karakombo Opkeama
- Elevation: 457 m (1,499 ft)

Population (2012)
  - Total: 35,305
  - Ethnicities: Azande • Ngbandi • others
  - Religions: Christianity • African Traditional Religion • Islam
- Time zone: UTC+01:00 (WAT)

Bangassou is a city in the southeastern part of the Central African Republic, lying on the north bank of the Mbomou River. It has a population of 24,447 (2003 census) and is the capital of the Mbomou prefecture. It is known for its wildlife, market, and nearby Bangassou Airport and is linked by ferry to the Democratic Republic of Congo on the south bank. The city is also home to the Roman Catholic Diocese of Bangassou.

Axmin Mining Camp and Kembé Falls are located in the area.

== History ==
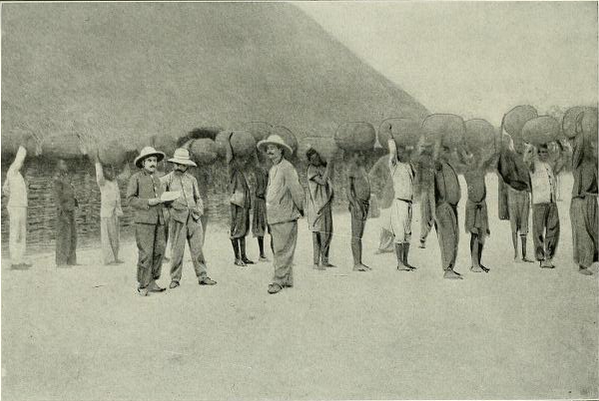
Rubber being bought by French men at Bangassou, 1906

During the French colonial occupation of Congo Free State, the French military established a base at Bangassou. In 1922 the Spiritains established a Catholic mission in the town. In 1931 the société cotonnière Comouna built a cotton processing plant in the town. In 1935 the town became the capital of the Department of Mbomou. Together with Sibut, Bangassou received electricity in 1980.

=== Sultanate ===
Bangassou has been a sultanate since at least the early 18th century. It was founded by the Bamba Bambari peoples. The Sultan since 2011 has been Maxime Faustin Mbringa Takama. He is one of many non-sovereign African monarchs.

=== Civil war ===
On 11 March 2013 Seleka rebels occupied the town. On 10 October 2013, their leader and 30 rebels were arrested by authorities. In May 2017 Anti-balaka attacked and for a few days occupied the town resulting in more than 100 deaths.

On January 3, 2021, rebel fighters backed by François Bozizé captured the town, according to MINUSCA. They withdrew from the town on 16 January and moved towards Niakari.

== Climate ==
Bangassou has a tropical savanna climate (Köppen climate classification Aw). Although the dry season from December to February is very short and more typical of tropical monsoon climates, the lengthy wet season from March to November is not sufficiently wet to so qualify.

Climate data for Bangassou
Month	Jan	Feb	Mar	Apr	May	Jun	Jul	Aug	Sep	Oct	Nov	Dec	Year
Mean daily maximum °C (°F)	34 (94)	35 (95)	34 (94)	33 (92)	33 (91)	32 (89)	31 (88)	31 (88)	32 (89)	32 (89)	33 (91)	33 (91)	33 (91)
Mean daily minimum °C (°F)	18 (65)	19 (66)	20 (68)	21 (69)	21 (69)	21 (69)	20 (68)	19 (67)	19 (67)	20 (68)	19 (67)	18 (65)	19 (67)
Average rainfall mm (inches)	23 (0.9)	43 (1.7)	120 (4.7)	140 (5.4)	230 (9)	180 (7.2)	180 (7.2)	210 (8.1)	190 (7.6)	260 (10.4)	97 (3.8)	38 (1.5)	1,711 (67.5)
Source: Weatherbase

== Gallery ==
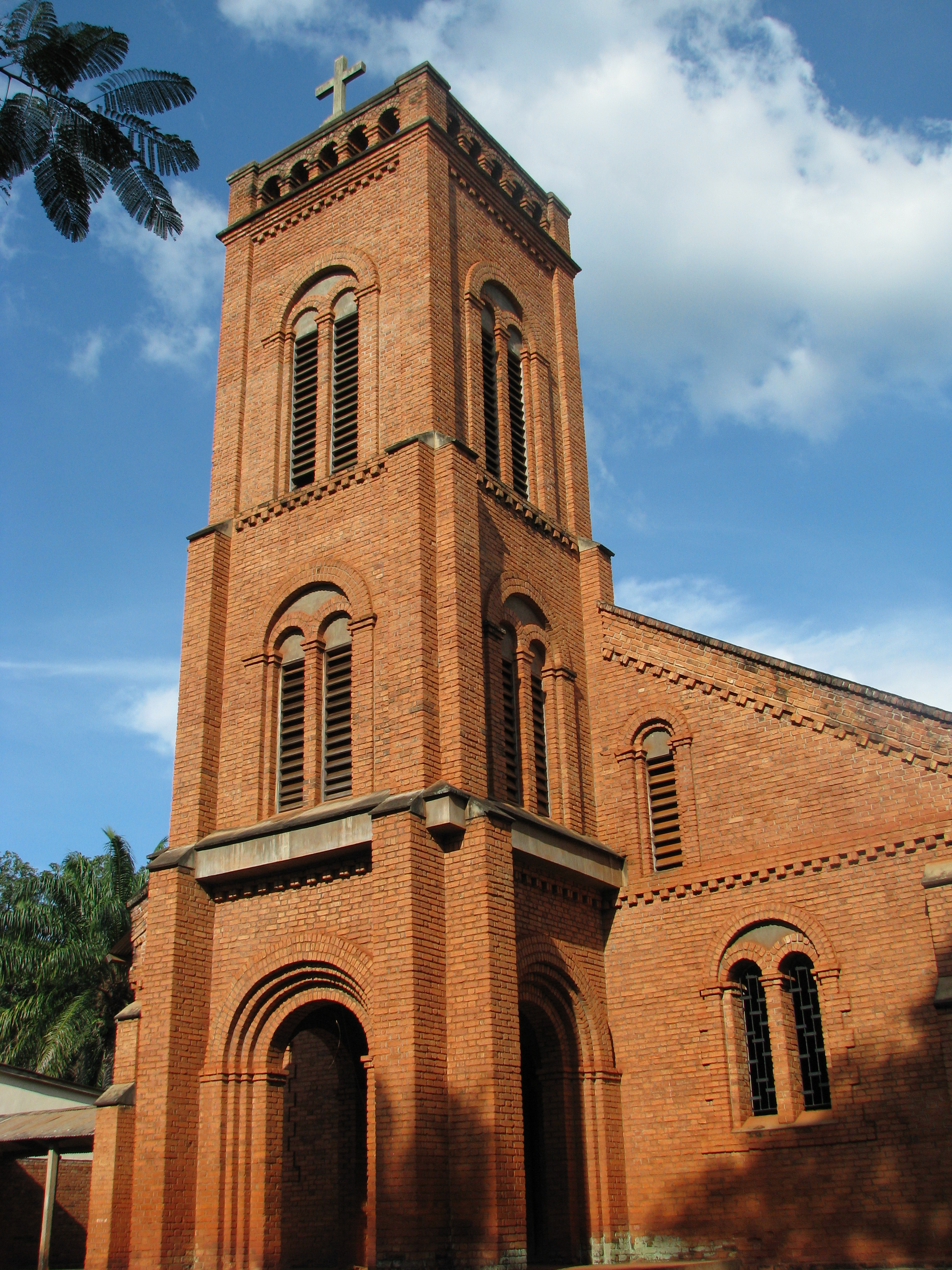
San Pedro Claver Cathedral, seat of the Roman Catholic Diocese of Bangassou

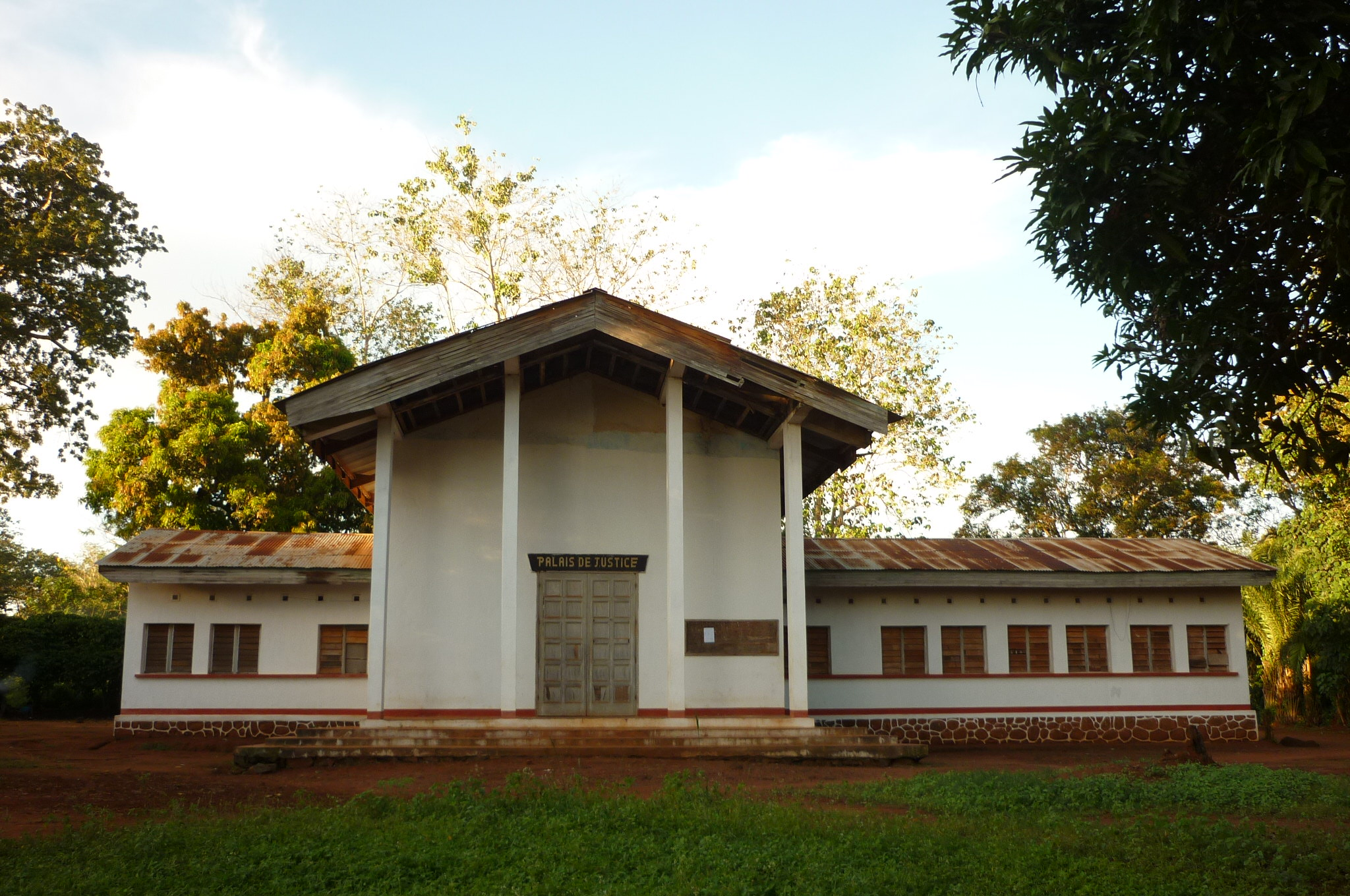
Bangassou courthouse

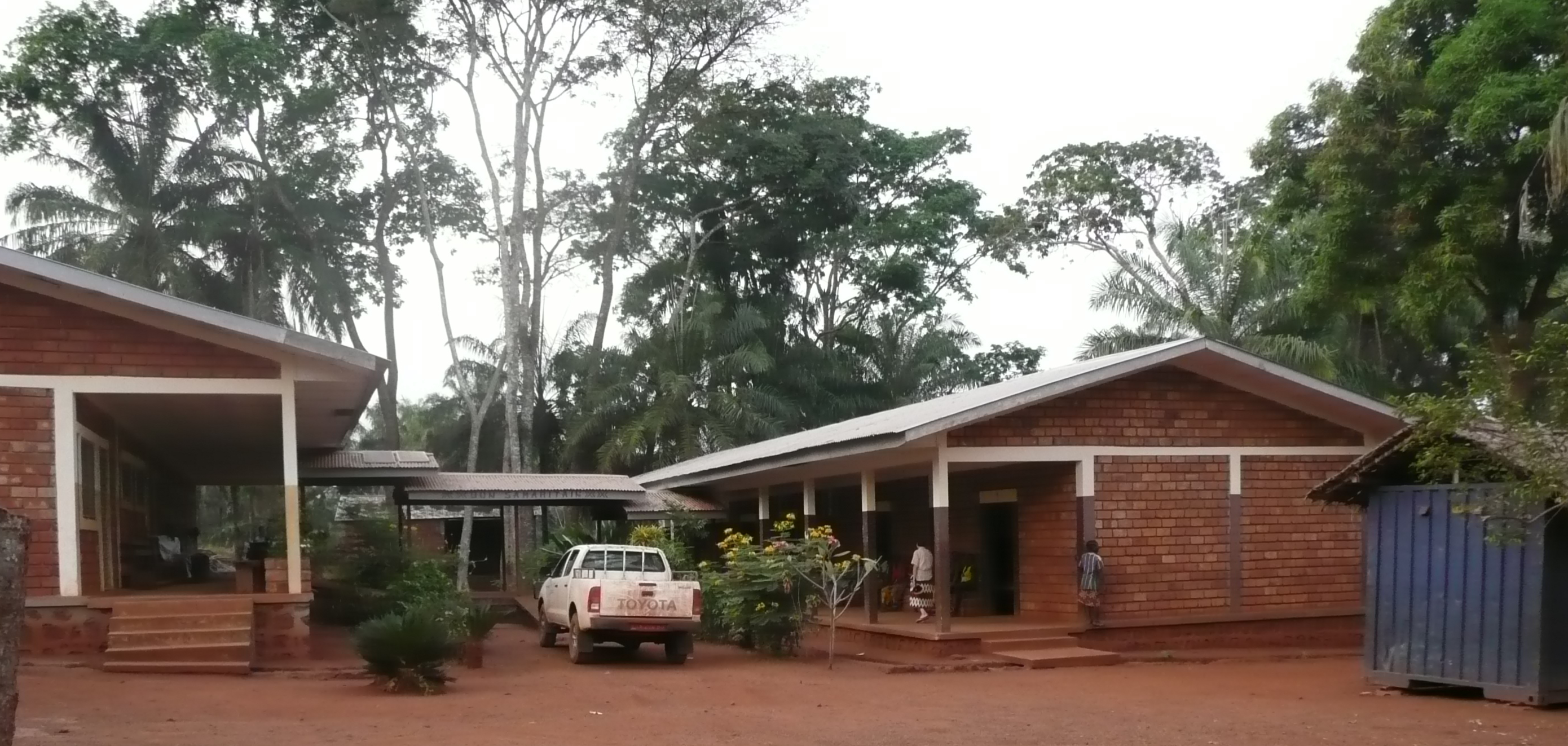
AIDS hospice, run in association with the diocese

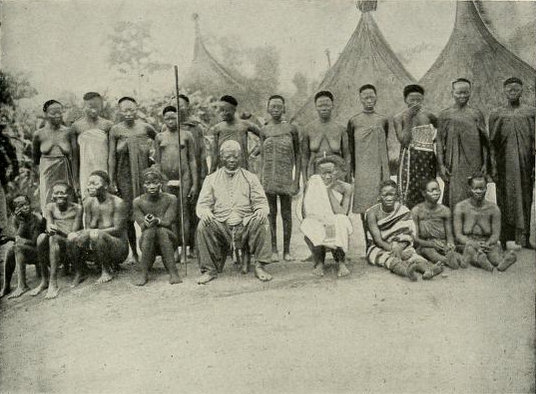
Sultan and his wives at Bangassou, 1906

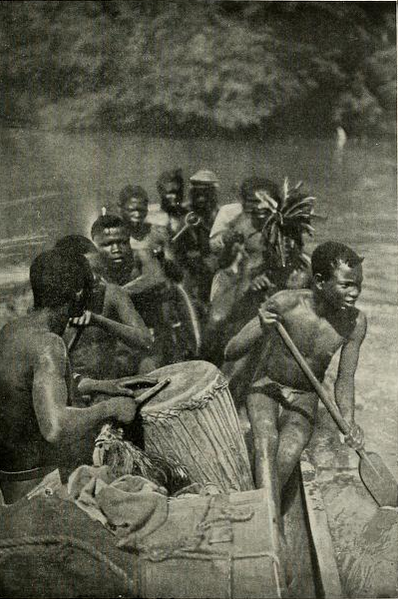
Near Bangassou, 1906
