= Rafaï =

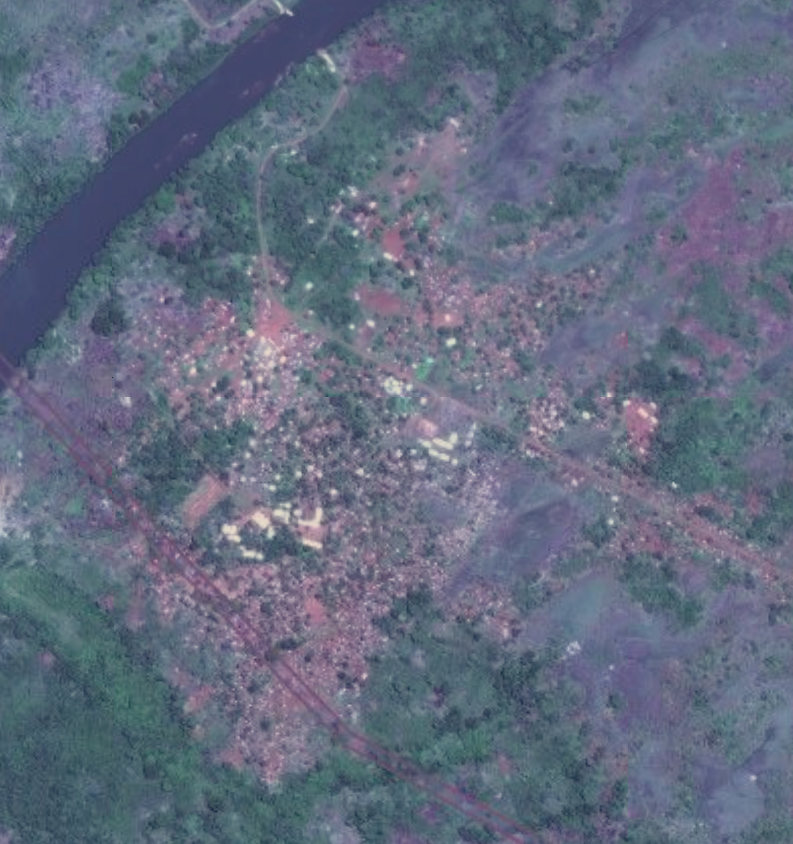
- Aerial view of Rafaï

- Location in Central African Republic
- Coordinates: 4°58′23″N 23°55′55″E
- Country: Central African Republic
- Prefecture: Mbomou

Government
  - Sub-Prefect: Simon-Pierre Gbake
  - Mayor: Marcel Kogoro

Population
  - Total: 14,000

Rafaï is a town and sub-prefecture on the Chinko River, in the Central African Republic prefecture of Mbomou. Its estimated population is about 14,000 people.

== History ==
The Sultanate of Rafaï was the last of Ubangi-Shari to still have its sultan. The last sultan assumed the throne in 1909. On 12 March 2013 Rafaï was captured by Seleka rebels. On 3 March 2018 it was captured by UPC rebels, but three days later it was recaptured by Anti-balaka. On 26 March 2021 it was reported that 14 rebels with automatic weapons were stationed near centre of Rafaï. On 30 October armed forces returned to Rafai after eight years of absence.

== Transport ==
Rafaï has a small civilian airport with a 4,249 foot unpaved runway.
