= Zémio =

- Sub-prefecture and town
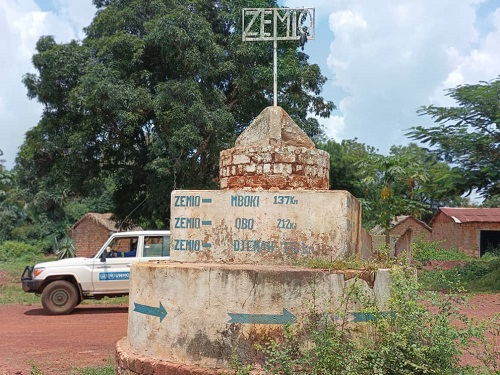
- Zémio in August 2023

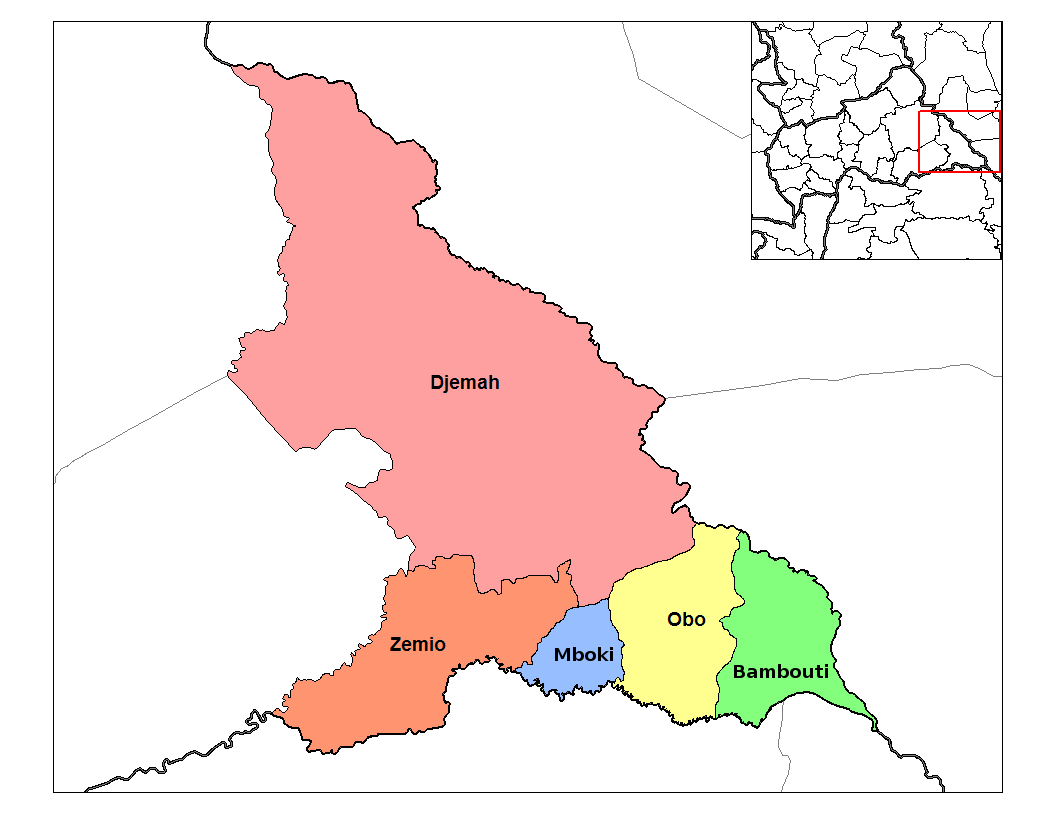
- Sub-prefectures of Haut-Mbomou

- Location in the Central African Republic
- Coordinates: 5°2′N 25°8′E
- Country: Central African Republic
- Prefecture: Haut-Mbomou

Government
  - Sub-Prefect: Parfait Romaric Achille Sangou-Zirani
  - Mayor: Rosalie Nawira
- Time zone: UTC+1 (WAT)

Zémio is a town and sub-prefecture in the Haut-Mbomou prefecture of the south-eastern Central African Republic. Zémio was the former capital of the Sultanate of Zémio before it was abolished in 1923 by France.

== History ==
French Congo colonial government sent five prisoners from Annam to Zémio to work for the French garrison in 1896. The workers planted rice, banana, and tobacco and established a settlement near the town. The prisoners stayed in Zémio until 10 April 1904, when they had to move to Brazzaville. In 1924, a missionary named John Buyse established AIM mission station in Zémio.

In the 1970s, Zémio was the center of the illegal ivory trade.

=== Central African Republic Civil War (2012–present) ===
In May 2014, Anti-balaka militia from Bahr attacked Zémio. From 18 to 21 November 2014, a sectarian clash between Muslims and Christians ensued in Zémio, resulting in two people dead, two missing, and 15 injured. Thirty-eight houses were burned in Mama 1 neighborhood.

On 28 June 2017 Ugandan forces withdrew from Zémio. Armed Muslims entered town, killing at least 28 civilians. As of January 2021, Zémio remains under control of Union for Peace in the Central African Republic rebel groups.

FACA and Wagner mercenaries from Bangui and Obo arrived in Zémio on 25 May 2024 after more than six years.

The town's residents held a demonstration against the arrest of several individuals who were accused of getting involved in the violence on 3 April 2025. The protestors dispersed after FACA soldiers fired into the air. Due to the demonstration, shops were closed. Responding to the demonstration, a joint MINUSCA-FACA patrol was formed to restore order. In June, 2026, Catholic priest Crépin Martial Monga was murdered by Wagner mercenaries.

== Demography ==
=== Ethnic groups ===
Zémio is a diverse town. It is inhabited by Azande, Banda, Runga, Gula, Fula, and Arabs.

=== Religion ===
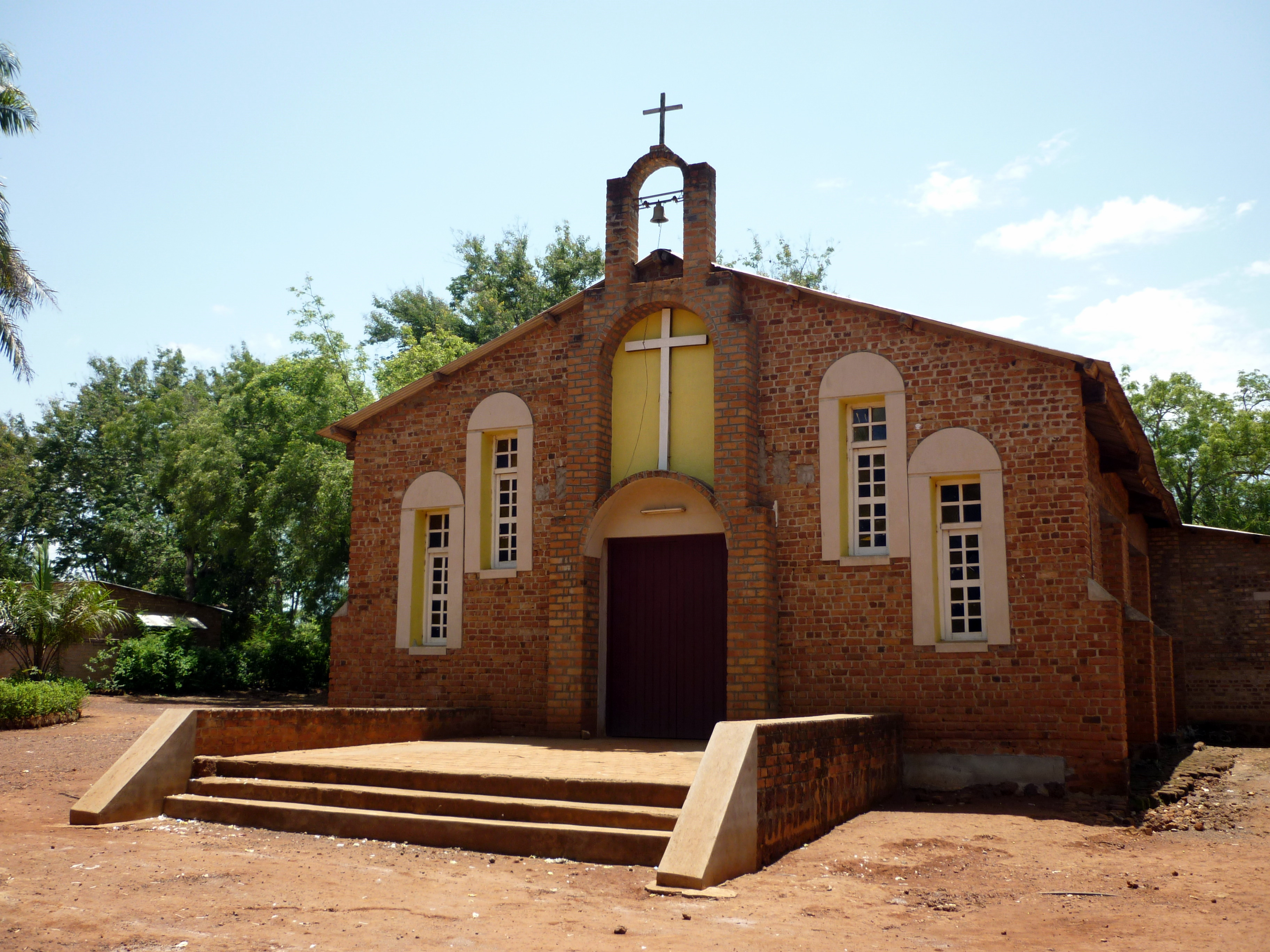
Parish of St. Jean Baptiste

Christians from Catholic and Protestant denominations and Muslims can be found in Zémio. In addition, there is a catholic church, a Protestant church, and a mosque in the town.

== Economy ==
Agriculture is the main source of income for the town residents. Other than that, some town residents engage in fishing, hunting, and honey-gathering activities for their livelihood. As of August 2023, Zémio is considered the most expensive city in Central African Republic. One bag of flour and sugar is priced at 70,000 and 80,000 CFA francs, respectively. Deplorable road conditions lead to Zémio, causing the journey from Bangui to Zémio to take two months, and the increase in fuel fare are attributed to the skyrocketting price of commodities in the town.

== Healthcare ==
There are two health centers in the town, which are owned by the government and Africa Inland Mission. Currently, the public health center has only one doctor.

== Security ==
From 2018 to 2024 the town's security is only served by the Morocco contingent of MINUSCA.

== Transport ==
The town is served by Zémio Airport.

== Gallery ==
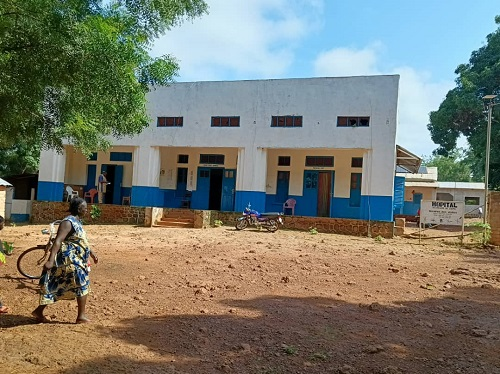
Zémio sub-prefect's office
