= Mbomou =

Prefecture of the Central African Republic

Coordinates: 5°00′N 23°30′E

- Prefecture

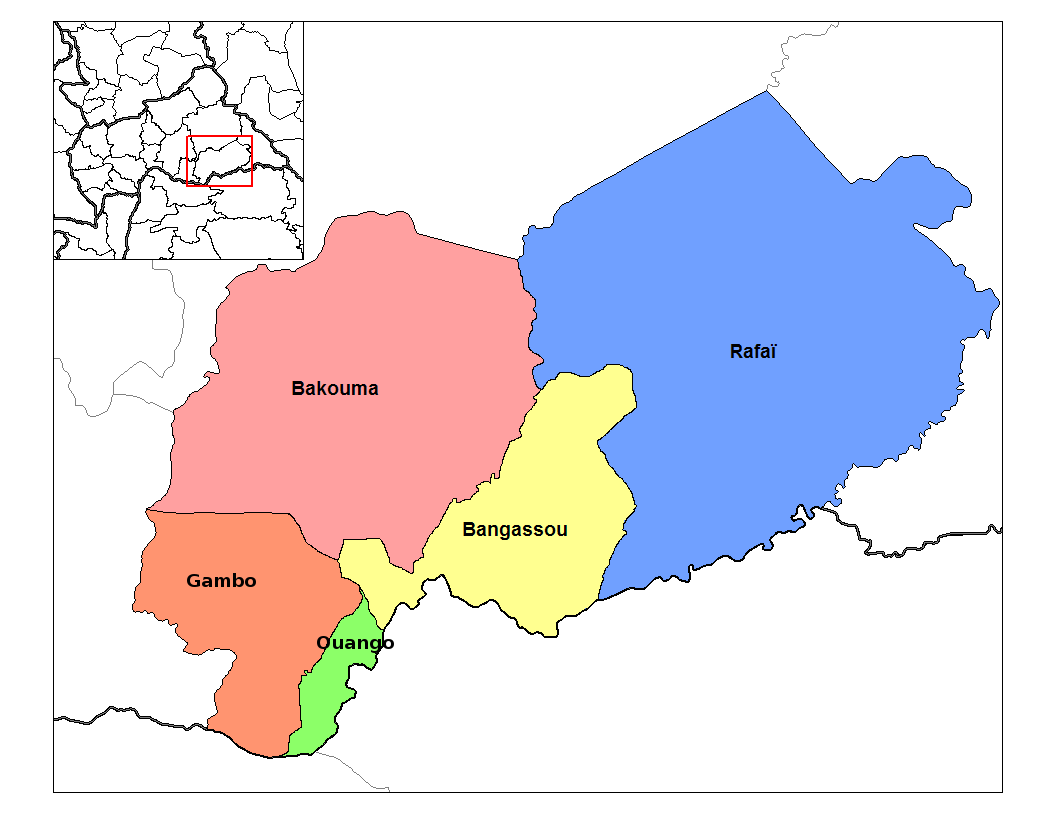
- Sub-prefectures of Mbomou
- Country: Central African Republic
- Capital: Bangassou

Government
  - Prefect: Vacant

Area
  - Total: 61,150 km^{2} (23,610 sq mi)

Population (2003 census)
  - Total: 164,009
  - Estimate (2024 estimation): 267,647

Mbomou is one of the twenty prefectures of the Central African Republic. It covers an area of 61,150 square kilometres (23,610 sq mi) and has a population of 164,009 (according to a 2003 census). The capital is Bangassou. Nearby are the Kembe Falls on the River Kotto. The prefecture is governed by Pierrette Benguere. In 2024, official estimates suggest the population reached 267,647 inhabitants.

== Sub-prefectures ==
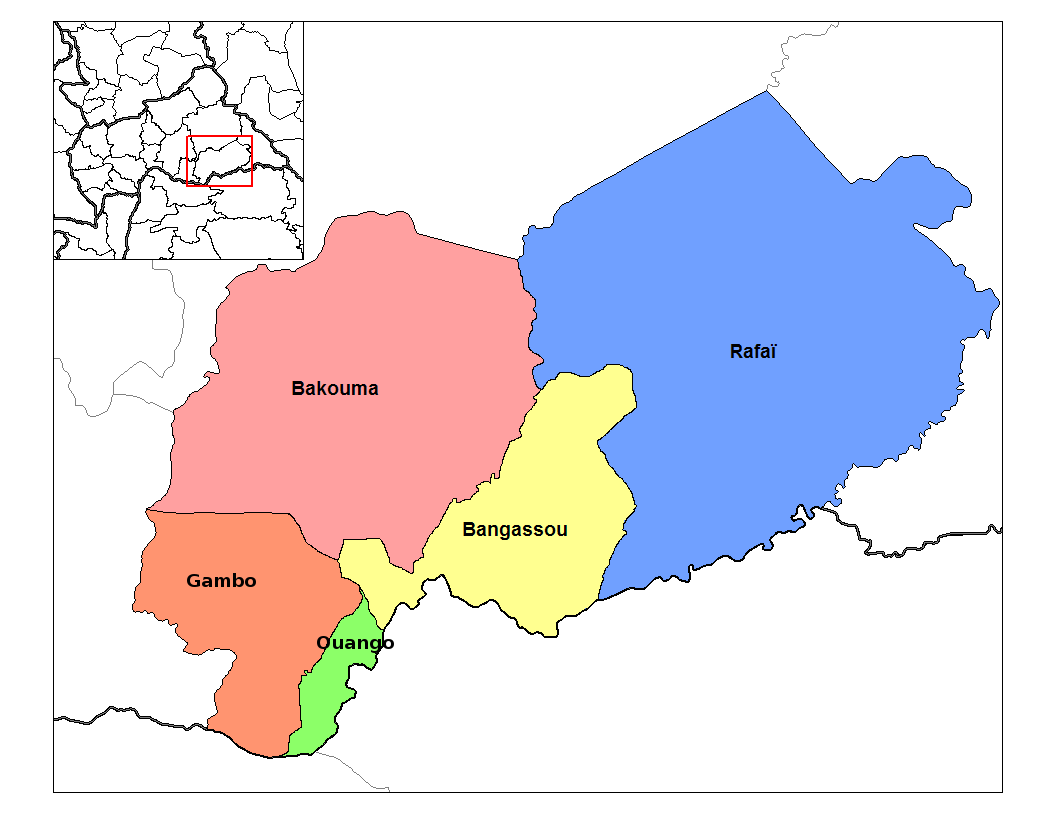
Sub-prefectures of Mbomou

- Bakouma
- Bangassou
- Rafai
- Gambo
- Ouango
