= Haut-Mbomou =

Prefecture of the Central African Republic

Coordinates: 6°00′N 26°00′E

- Prefecture
- Haut-Mbomou in the Central African Republic

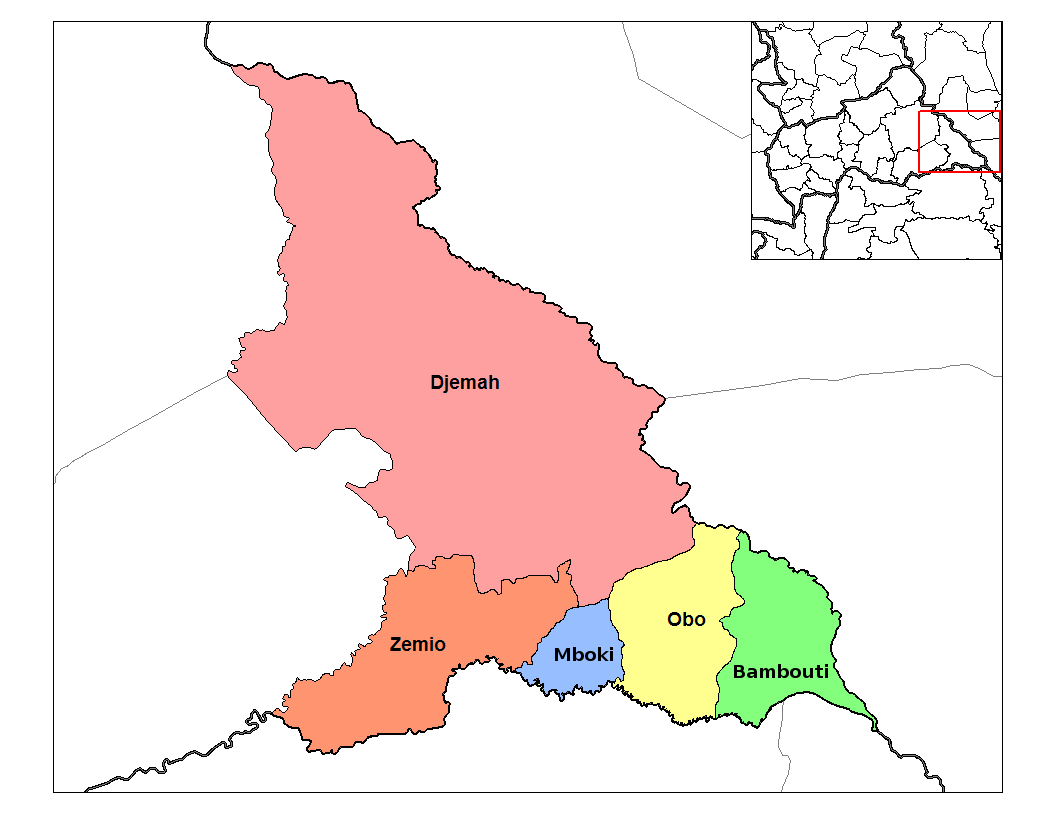
- Sub-prefectures of Haut-Mbomou
- Country: Central African Republic
- Capital: Obo

Government
  - Prefect: Léonard Mbele

Area
  - Total: 55,530 km^{2} (21,440 sq mi)

Population (2003 census)
  - Total: 57,602
  - Estimate (2024 estimation): 59,225

Haut-Mbomou ([o mbo.mu], "Upper Mbomou") is one of the 20 prefectures of the Central African Republic. Its capital is Obo. The African Pole of Inaccessibility is located 40 km to the North of Obo. In 2024, official estimates suggest the population reached 59,225 inhabitants, making it the least-populous prefecture in the country.

== Sub-prefectures ==
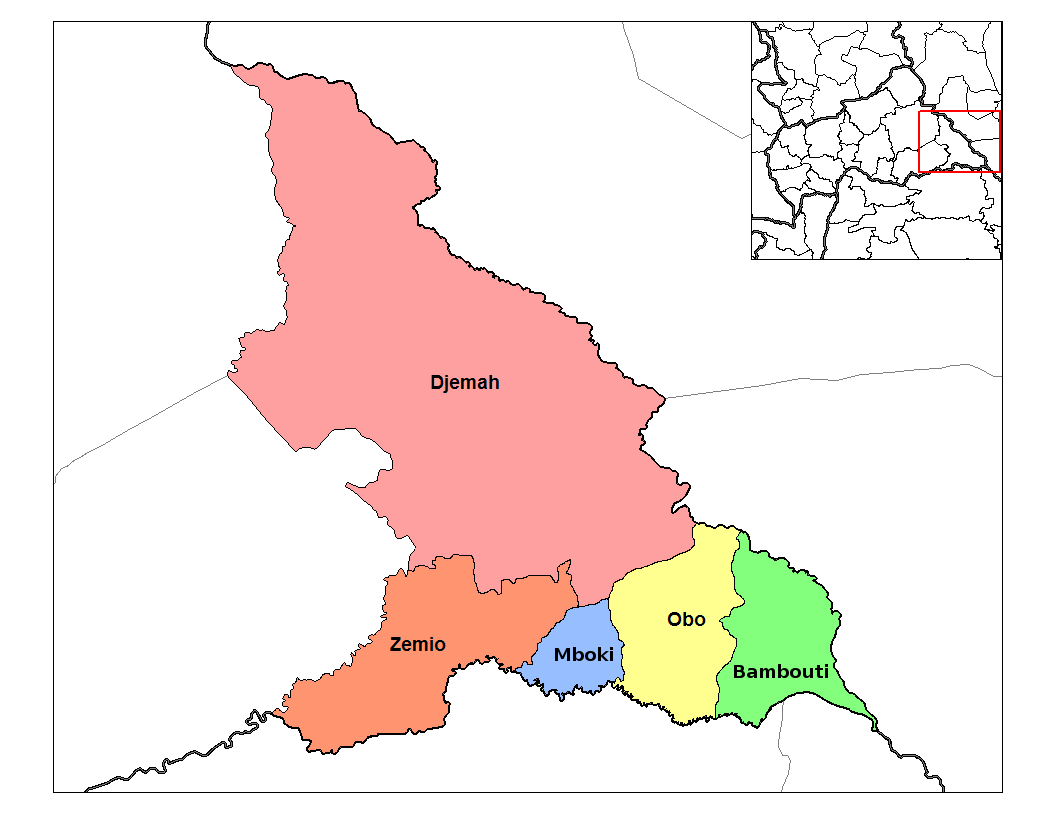
Sub-prefectures of Haut-Mbomou

- Djemah
- Obo
- Zemio
- Bambouti
- Mboki
