= Battles of Bambari (2020–2021) =

Clashes between the Central African Republic and the Central African Army

Battles of Bambari (2020-2021)
- Part of Central African Republic Civil War
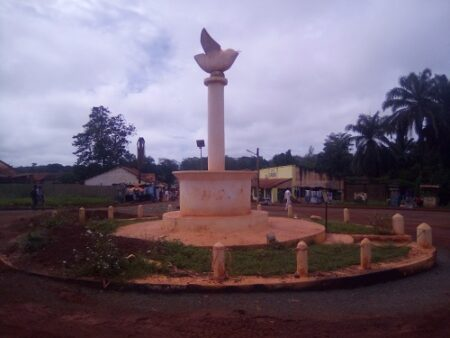
- Downtown Bambari, where clashes took place
| Date | 1st battle: December 22, 2020; 2nd battle: February 15–17, 2021 |
| Location | Bambari, Central African Republic |
| Result | 1st battle: UPC victory 2nd battle: FACA/Wagner victory |
| Territorial changes | UPC captures Bambari from December 22 to February 15; FACA and Wagner recapture Bambari after February 15 |

Belligerents
| FACA; Wagner Group | UPC |

Commanders and leaders
| Unknown | Ali Darassa |

Casualties and losses
| Unknown | Unknown |
- 21+ civilians killed (al-Taqwa alone), 111 injured (between December and February)

Between December 7, 2020, and February 18, 2021, clashes broke out between the Union for Peace in the Central African Republic (UPC) coalition and the Central African Army (FACA) in and around Bambari, Central African Republic. UPC rebels captured the city on December 22, preventing residents from voting in the Central African general election. In February 2021, Wagner and FACA soldiers attacked Bambari, killing a number of civilians and displacing thousands.

== Background ==
In 2019, Bambari had been controlled by MINUSCA peacekeepers from Portugal, Bangladesh, and Nepal. The rebel coalition UPC attacked the city for over a week, but was unable to capture it. The Central African government continued to hold the city into late 2020, although UPC fighters still had a presence in areas surrounding Bambari. The United Nations had dubbed Bambari as "weapons-free" following the clashes in 2017. UNICEF began restocking aid supplies in wartorn areas of the country, including Bambari in November 2020, just before the fighting.

== Battle ==
=== Akpé ambush and UPC foothold ===
The first attack on Bambari from UPC began around 5pm on December 7 in the Akpé neighborhood in the western part of Bambari. A FACA patrol had just passed through the neighborhood when gunshots rang out from UPC fighters firing heavy weapons. The clashes then spread into the adjacent Bornou neighborhood, with a resident of Bornou stating that the shots shifted to lighter automatic weapons. Several residents of the neighborhood fled their homes during the gunfire, and returned the following day. The fighting stopped later in the evening of December 7, and it is unknown whether FACA or the UPC fired first.

On the night between December 8 and 9, UPC militants entrenched themselves in Bambari. Led by Ali Darassa, UPC fighters arrived in Bambari on trucks and motorbikes from Bokolobo and Bria, and continued to arrive later in the night from other villages. Meanwhile, FACA soldiers reinforced their positions elsewhere in the city and increased the number of patrols in neighborhoods. Wagner Group mercenaries had also arrived in Bambari to aid FACA.

=== First battle and UPC capture of Bambari ===
After weeks of calm, clashes broke out in Bambari at midnight on December 21. The gunfire briefly stopped, but resumed between 3am and 5am. The UPC rebels were positioned in the neighborhoods of Adji, Bornou, and Élevage, and had been there preparing for a battle for at least twenty-four hours. At 10am on December 22, the UPC attacked a FACA gendarmerie base in the center of the town and then attacked the Bambari police station. Residents in Bambari stated that there was heavy damage in the city center, and the city was "shaking" from the amount of gunfire.

Fighting in the city lasted for three hours before FACA soldiers, Wagner mercenaries, and MINUSCA peacekeepers fled the city towards Sibut through the UPC-controlled village of Grimari. MINUSCA stated that in the battle, the gendarmerie and police station had been "ransacked" and that houses nearby were infiltrated and looted by the UPC. By the afternoon of December 22, the UPC had seized control of Bambari. Bambari mayor Abel Matchipata stated that FACA were waiting for reinforcements, and that Bambari was fully controlled by UPC.

=== Aftermath of UPC capture ===
Central African government employees and sympathizers fled to the MINUSCA base in Bambari during the UPC's capture of the town, but began returning to their homes as the dust settled and calm returned. The Central African government also asked Portuguese MINUSCA peacekeepers to fight back against UPC rebels that had followed the retreating FACA and Wagner, and were en route to Sibut. UPC commander Ali Darassa visited Bambari on December 26, a day before the 2020–21 Central African general election. Analysts suggested that Darassa's visit to the city was an attempt to secure the vote of Bambari residents for the UPC.

Between 5am and 6am on December 27, the day of the election, UPC fighters shot gunfire in Bambari to pressure civilians not to participate in the election. Polling stations were closed in Bambari that day. In late December, Wagner forces killed a driver for Medecins Sans Frontieres and three passengers for failing to stop at a checkpoint.

=== Second battle and recapture by FACA and Wagner ===
On February 12, FACA and Wagner forces dismantled a UPC checkpoint in Kombele, ten kilometers away from Bambari. UPC fighters stationed in Bambari began a counterattack to recapture two UPC hostages, but FACA used this counterattack to capture a UPC base in Bambari, forcing the fighters to flee part of the city. A resident of Bambari stated that while the city was calm, residents were apprehensive of a second round of violence.

FACA and Wagner forces attacked Bambari between February 15 and 16 to recapture the city from the UPC. The fighting began on the afternoon of February 15 with shelling of alleged UPC neighborhoods. Russian forces also used at least one helicopter. One resident of Bambari stated that she and many other civilians had fled to al-Taqwa mosque for safety. Wagner forces entered the mosque and began shooting indiscriminately at the civilians, even those with their hands up. A survivor of the mosque massacre stated that four people were shot immediately, and that he and others had fled over a wall into the bush as FACA soldiers were already in control of the hospital. The Russian helicopter also gunned down civilians in the street and in houses, firing indiscriminately upon neighborhoods.

Around twenty-one people were killed in the al-Taqwa mosque massacre, and one video showed fourteen bodies. Some local sources stated that two UPC fighters were in the mosque, but survivors stated there were none. At the Bambari regional hospital, Médecins Sans Frontières announced that thirty-six people arrived at the hospital with injuries on February 16. By that time, Wagner and FACA were in control of Bambari. MSF also stated that during the battle, the hospital had been attacked by FACA and Wagner.

The Central African government stated that they had "liberated" Bambari by February 17. However, the Red Cross stated that fighting was still ongoing in Bambari in the center and outlying neighborhoods, with many residents fleeing from their houses. Around this time, many civilians' bodies were lying in the streets of the city from the main fighting several days prior, and the civilian death toll was still unknown.

== Aftermath ==
Bambari was relatively calm after the Wagner and FACA recapture of the city. In March 2021, residents of Bambari stated that Wagner mercenaries were pressuring Muslim residents - the majority of Bambari - and would harass and attack them if Muslims were near or working in the Ndassima gold mine. Wagner forces also killed a local chief who was accused of being sympathetic to the UPC.

Wagner and FACA forces razed the Elevage refugee camp to the ground on June 7, 2021, displacing 8,500 people. Two days prior, small clashes had broken out between UPC and the Wagner and FACA, killing two civilians and a FACA soldier. Many residents were left with nothing after the camp was razed, and the heavy rains and lack of any form of shelter, hygiene, or mosquito netting made it hard to start building again.
