= Battle of Bangassou =

- Part of Central African Republic Civil War
Date	January 3, 2021
Location	Bangassou, Mbomou, Central African Republic
Result	Rebel victory: The CPC and FPRC withdraw from Bangassou on January 17 following a MINUSCA ultimatum

Belligerents
MINUSCA: Morocco; Rwanda; Gabon; FACA; Wagner Group	CPC: UPC; FPRC

Commanders and leaders
Pierrette Benguere	Mahamet Saleh; Abdoulaye Hissène

Casualties and losses
2 peacekeepers killed 2 FACA soldiers wounded	13+ fighters killed
- Several civilians killed and injured 15,000+ refugees

On January 3, 2021, rebels from the CPC coalition and FPRC attacked Bangassou, the capital of Mbomou, Central African Republic, sparking clashes with MINUSCA peacekeepers. The CPC captured Bangassou within hours on January 3, forcing thousands of civilians to flee to the Democratic Republic of the Congo or to the MINUSCA base in Bangassou. The CPC abandoned the city on January 17 following an ultimatum by MINUSCA. The battle of Bangassou was part of a larger series of CPC attacks on Central African cities during and after the 2020–21 Central African general election.

== Background ==
In late December 2020, Central African authorities began the 2020–21 Central African general election all across the country. At the time of the elections, the town was controlled by Central African soldiers (FACA) and Wagner Group mercenaries. Moroccan peacekeepers in MINUSCA also had a presence in the town. The Coalition of Patriots for Change (CPC), a coalition of anti-government rebel groups led by deposed president François Bozizé, began attacking major towns across the country during the last week of December to prevent citizens from voting. The Popular Front for the Rebirth of Central African Republic (FPRC) was not part of the CPC coalition.

On December 31, 2020, MINUSCA forces freed 25 Central African soldiers that had been encircled by rebels in Bakouma, also in Mbomou, during the rebels' campaign to block voting. That same week, CPC fighters attacked and captured the town of Bambari, the capital of Ouaka prefecture. On January 2, the CPC attacked the town of Damara, in an attack that was repelled by FACA and MINUSCA. Prior to the battles, Bangassou had a population of roughly 30,000 people.

== Battle ==
=== Battle ===
CPC and FPRC rebels had been spotted by locals around Bangassou for around twenty-four hours before the attacks on January 3. The attack began between 5 and 5:30 a.m. on January 3. and was allegedly led by Mahamet Saleh and Abdoulaye Hissène of the FPRC. Saleh and Hissene also brought soldiers from Ali Darassa's UPC to fight in Bangassou. Corbeau News Centrafrique doubted Saleh's claims of fighting in Bangassou. The first barrages of artillery launched by the rebels targeted the FACA base in Bangassou.

The fighting in the Bangassou had largely ceased by 10 a.m., according to MINUSCA head Mankeur Ndiaye. Residents reported that the rebels had seized control of the MINUSCA base in Bangassou, although it was later reported that MINUSCA was indeed in control of its base. FACA and Wagner soldiers had fled the city by 4 p.m. that same day, and some had hid in the MINUSCA base. About 80% of the population of Bangassou had crossed the Mbomou River to flee to Ndu in the Democratic Republic of the Congo in the aftermath of the attack. The CPC stole cattle and looted civilian homes during the battle. Satellite imagery on January 4 showed the city's central market as much less crowded than normal. Two FACA soldiers were wounded in the battle and brought to a hospital in Bria and at least five rebels were killed.

Despite the CPC's seizure of the city, MINUSCA stated that it was still in control of Bangassou on January 3, a claim repeated by newly appointed Central African Prime Minister Firmin Ngrébada. MINUSCA reported that during the battle, peacekeepers brought wounded civilians and government workers to the MINUSCA base, including Prefect of Mbomou Pierrette Benguere. The bishop of Bangassou stated that many children were injured by stray bullets during the attack. In a statement on January 5, MINUSCA condemned the attacks by the CPC in Bangassou and Damara. On January 11, a UNHCR report in Ndu stated that 15,000 civilians from Bangassou and Damara had fled to the town following the CPC attack. 800 others sought shelter in the Bangassou University Hospital.

A resident in Bangassou interviewed by Corbeau News Centrafrique on January 7 stated that the fighters did not attack civilians, although much of the city was apprehensive towards the fighters. The only place in the city that the CPC did not have access to was the MINUSCA base, where prefect Benguere was staying. Humanitarian aid was also not reaching civilians in the town.

=== MINUSCA recapture ===
Following an ultimatum by MINUSCA, the CPC and FPRC abandoned and looted Bangassou on January 17. Rwandan peacekeepers from MINUSCA recaptured the city that same day. The recapture of the city was lauded by Prime Minister Ngrebeda. On January 18, two MINUSCA peacekeepers were killed between Bangassou and Gambo in a CPC ambush. The clash occurred at 4 p.m. on the Mbari bridge, and eight CPC fighters were killed as well. Despite MINUSCA recapturing Bangassou, the CPC still held a presence in the bush and surrounding villages. Roads leading in and out of the city were mined by the fighters as well. FPRC commander Saleh was headquartered in Niakari until February 20. Rwandan peacekeepers held a presence in Bangassou until March 2021, when they withdrew.
