= Ippy massacre =

- Part of Central African Republic Civil War
- Location: Ippy, Ouaka, Central African Republic
- Date: January 23, 2019
- Target: Funeralgoers
- Deaths: 15 (per HRW); 16 (per Corbeau News Centrafrique); 18 (per MINUSCA)
- Injuries: 21 (per MINUSCA); 24 (per CNC)
- Perpetrator: Lone soldiers from the Union for Peace in the Central African Republic

On January 23, 2019, a drunken soldier from the Union for Peace in the Central African Republic (UPC) shot up a funeral in Ippy, Central African Republic, killing between 15 and 18 civilians and injuring at least 21 more.

== Background ==
Ouaka Prefecture, where Ippy is located, is a hub of activity for the Union for Peace in the Central African Republic (UPC) rebel group. In early January 2019, the group was losing ground across the country, but particularly in Ouaka. On January 19, two civilians were killed in a clash with MINUSCA in Bambari. Four days later on January 23, another clash with MINUSCA at Bambari left three civilians dead.

== Massacre ==
The massacre took place on the night between January 22 and 23. Two UPC fighters - one armed, one unarmed - arrived at the funeral site around 9:30pm while people were singing and dancing. The armed fighter, named Ali, just began shooting sporadically at the funeralgoers, killing several children. The perpetrators then fled into the bush.

Human Rights Watch said that 15 people were killed in the massacre, including five children. MINUSCA said that 18 civilians were killed and 21 were injured during the attack. Corbeau News Centrafrique reported that three people died of their injuries in the days following the attack. 24 people injured in the attack were being treated in Ippy by Médecins Sans Frontières, and another nine were transported to Bria and later Bangui to receive treatment. CNC said that by January 25, 16 people had been killed and at least 24 injured.

Following the massacre, UPC commanders publicly executed Ali and his companion in response to the massacre.
