= Barthélemy Zinga-Pirioua =

Mayor of Mbaïki
- In office 24 December 1973 – 31 December 1974
- President: Jean-Bédel Bokassa
- Preceded by: Alphonse Mossaba IV
- Succeeded by: Aubert Berime

Prefect of Lobaye
- In office 24 December 1973 – 31 December 1974
- President: Jean-Bédel Bokassa
- Preceded by: Alphonse Mossaba IV
- Succeeded by: Aubert Berime

Prefect of Haute-Sangha
- In office 20 March 1971 – 30 September 1971
- President: Jean-Bédel Bokassa
- Preceded by: Jean Hilaire Yamba
- Succeeded by: René Gounebana
- In office 12 January 1968 – 30 September 1970
- President: Jean-Bédel Bokassa
- Preceded by: François Pouninguinza
- Succeeded by: Jean Hilaire Yamba

Mayor of 3rd arrondissement of Bangui
- In office 30 September 1970 – 20 March 1971
- President: Jean-Bédel Bokassa
- Succeeded by: Louis Kpado

Prefect of Bamingui-Bangoran
- In office 9 December 1965 – 12 January 1968
- President: David Dacko; Jean-Bédel Bokassa
- Preceded by: Pierre Radium
- Succeeded by: François Pouninguinza

Prefect of Basse-Kotto
- In office 4 January 1963 – 9 December 1965
- President: David Dacko
- Preceded by: André Perrière
- Succeeded by: Jean Hilaire Yamba

Prefect of Ouham
- In office 16 September 1961 – 7 September 1962
- President: David Dacko
- Preceded by: Henri René Maudry-Gauvin
- Succeeded by: Edmond Maurice Moussa

Prefect of Ouaka
- In office 24 July 1961 – 16 September 1961
- President: David Dacko
- Preceded by: Charles Bornou
- Succeeded by: Gabriel Gaba

Member of Representative Council
- In office 1946–1952
- Constituency: Bambari
Chief and Sub-prefect posts
Sub-prefect of Grimari
In office 23 January 1961 – 16 September 1961
| Preceded by | Himself (as chief) |
| Succeeded by | Jean Hilaire Yamba |
Chief of Grimari District
In office 4 November 1960 – 23 January 1961
| Preceded by | Maurice Moussa |
| Succeeded by | Himself (as Sub-prefect) |
Acting Chief of Bakala District
In office 18 June 1959 – 4 November 1960
| Preceded by | Jean Arthur Bandio |
| Succeeded by | Firmin Guy Nangui-Dzapa |
Acting Chief of Ippy District
In office 24 May 1958 – c. 1960
| Preceded by | Pierre Xavier Christian Cornée |
| Succeeded by | Malingao |

Personal details
- Born: 23 December 1917 Kouango, Ubangi-Shari (now the Central African Republic)
- Died: Unknown
- Party: MESAN
- Occupation: Politician; Clerk

Barthélemy Paul Zinga-Pirioua (23 December 1917 - unknown), often written Barthélemy Zinga-Piroua, was a Central African politician, clerk, and interpreter who served in various prefectural positions under two different presidents.

== Biography ==
Zinga-Pirioua was born in Kouango on 23 December 1917 to Paoul Pirioua and Dorothée Limotho. In the 1930s, he worked as a clerk for the colonial government at Kouango. He served as an interpreter in Kouango in 1937. On 29 August 1945, he earned the évolué status while working as an administrative clerk.

In the 1946, Zinga-Pirioua was elected as a Member of the Representative Council representing Fort Sibut district from Ubangi Economic and Social Action (AESO) faction. While serving as a council member, he joined Cotton Producers' Cooperative and served on its board in 1950. He failed to win a seat at the Territorial Assembly representing Ouaka in the 1952 election. His failure to win the 1952 election led him to join MESAN. In 1952, he was registered as a 2nd echelon clerk in Ubangi-Shari government administration.

In an unknown year, Zinga-Pirioua entered the territorial administration services and was assigned to the Ouaka region. On 24 May 1958, he became the acting Chief of Ippy District. During his service as the acting Chief of Ippy District, he was appointed as the acting Chief of Bakala District on 18 June 1959.

When the Central African Republic became an independent country on 13 August 1960, Zinga-Pirioua served as the Acting Chief of the Bakala District. On 4 November 1960, he became Chief of Grimari District. When Grimari's administrative division status was replaced from a district to a sub-prefect on 23 January 1961, he became the Sub-prefect of Grimari until 16 September. While serving as Sub-prefect of Grimari, he also served as Prefect of Ouaka from 24 July to 16 September.

The government appointed Zinga-Pirioua as a Prefect of Ouham on 16 September 1961, serving that position for almost a year. Afterwards, he became the Prefect of Basse-Kotto from 4 January 1963 to 9 December 1965. He then worked as a Prefect of Bamingui-Bangoran from 9 December 1965 to 12 January 1968. Subsequently, he served as Prefect of Haute-Sangha (now Mambéré-Kadéï) from 12 January 1968 to 30 September 1970. He then became the Mayor of the 3rd arrondissement of Bangui (30 September 1970 – 20 March 1971) and was later reinstated as Prefect of Haute-Sangha on 20 March 1971, serving for six months.

On 24 December 1973, Zinga-Pirioua became the Prefect of Lobaye. While serving as prefect of Lobaye, he also served as the Mayor of Mbaïki. He resigned from both positions on 31 December 1974, the day he announced his retirement. He died in an unknown year.

== Awards ==
- , Officer Order of Central African Merit - 1 December 1967.
- Officer Operation Bokassa - 19 December 1974.

== Bibliography ==
- Serre, Jacques; Fandos-Rius, Juan (2014). Répertoire de l'administration territoriale de la République centrafricaine. Paris: L’Harmattan. ISBN 978-2-343-01298-8.
