= List of cities in the Central African Republic =

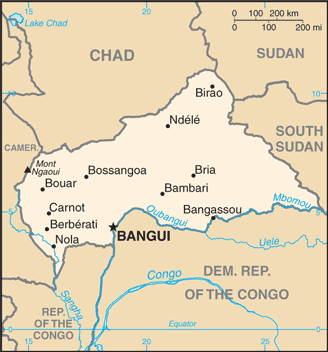
Map of the Central African Republic

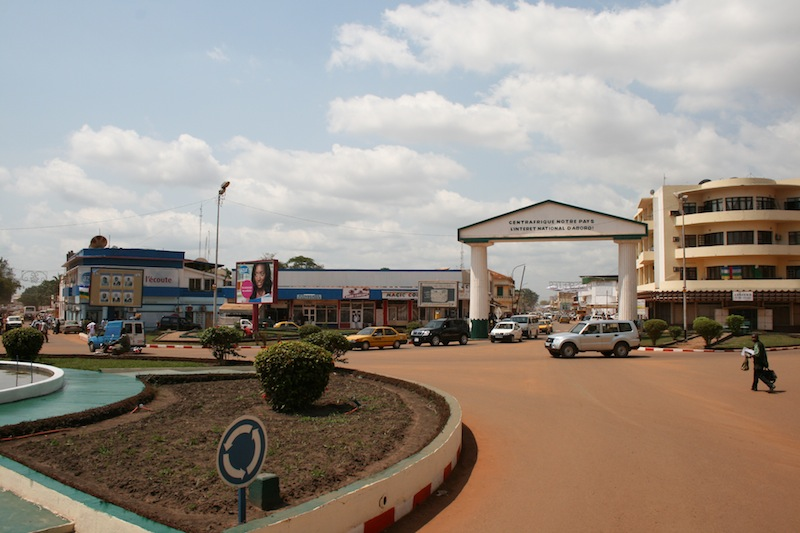
Bangui City Centre

This is a list of cities and towns in the Central African Republic.

- Alindao
- Baboua
- Bahamo
- Bambari
- Bangassou
- Bangui
- Baoro
- Batangafo
- Berbérati
- Bimbo
- Birao
- Boali
- Bobangui
- Boda
- Bossangoa
- Bossembélé
- Bouar
- Bouca
- Bozoum
- Bria
- Carnot
- Damara
- Gambo
- Gamboula
- Guen
- Ippy
- Kabo
- Kaga-Bandoro
- Kembé
- Kouango
- Mbaïki
- Mobaye
- Mongoumba
- N'Délé
- Nola
- Obo
- Ouadda
- Ouango
- Paoua
- Rafaï
- Sibut
- Sikkikede
- Zinga

== Largest cities ==
The list below logs all the cities with a population over 30,000 inhabitants as of the 2021 estimate of Institut Centrafricain des Statistiques et des Études Économiques et Sociales.

Rank	City / town	Préfecture	Population (2021 census)
1	Bangui	Bangui	812,407
2	Bimbo	Ombella M'Poko	348,802
3	Bégoua	Bangui	264,067
4	Carnot	Mambéré	129,032
5	Berbérati	Mambéré-Kadéï	103,713
6	Bambari	Ouaka	83,029
7	Bouar	Nana-Mambéré	71,680
8	Bossangoa	Ouham	55,353
9	Kaga-Bandoro	Nana-Grébizi	55,047
10	Bangassou	Mbomou	54,049
11	Paoua	Lim-Pendé	47,703
12	Bria	Haute-Kotto	47,226
13	Kouango	Ouaka	36,575
14	Bocaranga	Ouham-Pendé	36,418
15	Baboua	Nana-Mambéré	33,739
16	Alindao	Basse-Kotto	32,588
17	Sibut	Kémo	31,986
18	Nola	Sangha-Mbaéré	31,923
