= Dimitri Ayoloma =

Central African militant

Dimitri Placide Ayoloma
- Military career
- Allegiance: Anti-balaka
- Service years: 2014 –

Dimitri Placide Ayoloma – is an Anti-balaka commander from the Central African Republic, active in Ouaka and Kémo prefectures. He is responsible for multiple crimes including killing of peacekeeper, looting, arson, assault and kidnapping for ransom.

== Life ==
He was formerly a member of Central African Armed Forces. In December 2014 he was reportedly Anti-balaka zone commander in Grimari subprefecture under leadership of Patrice-Edouard Ngaïssona.

On 22 August 2018 he kidnapped two citizens of Ndjoukou subprefecture including village chief and 45-year old Sévérin. He demanded payment of million CFA francs for release. After receiving 370,000 CFA francs and eight goats he released them after beating them with sticks.

On 15 March 2020 his fighters launched attack on Grimari, opening fire on the homes of the mayor and sub-prefect. When UN peacekeepers intervened to stop them, one of them was fatally injured by an Anti-balaka fighter. On 17 May 2020 MINUSCA announced operation in Kouango-Sibut-Grimari triangle to stop abuses committed by Ayoloma's group. Between 3 and 16 June his group launched at least ten attacks against Non Governmental Organizations (or NGOs) and UN vehicles on Grimari-Sibut axis in Ouaka and Kemo prefectures. On 2 August he was injured during a failed the attack on Grimari.

In December 2020 he refused to join Coalition of Patriots for Change and instead sided with government forces, handing over some CPC rebels. In following months his group received several weapons and uniforms from local armed forces as well as coordinating military actions with him. On 12 March 2021 while armed forces were passing through Bangao village in Kouango subprefecture he with eight fighters led by him burned several Muslim houses as well as a mosque and stole inhabitants property.

Between 7 and 12 October 2022 his forces clashed with faction of Anti-balaka aligned with CPC led by Sioni Mènè in Ndjoukou subprefecture. Clashes between both groups led to 10 deaths including three civilians. On 14 October it was reported that Ayoloma group withdrew from center of Ndjoukou towards Ndéngou village following deployment of MINUSCA peacekeepers. On 15 October clashes erupted again in multiple villages in Ndjoukou, with Ayoloma forces breaking doors and looting houses. Thousands of people were displaced.

Wagner arrested Ayoloma in Grimari on 6 January 2025 after making a death threat to all hospital staff when he visited his brother, who underwent hernia surgery.
