= Ngakobo =

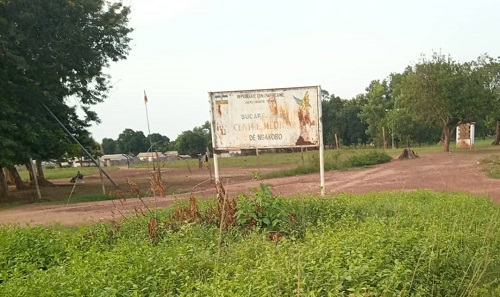

- Location in Central African Republic
- Coordinates: 5°19′24″N 20°42′35″E
- Country: Central African Republic
- Prefecture: Ouaka
- Sub-prefecture: Bambari
- Commune: Ngougbia

Ngakobo is a town located in Ouaka Prefecture, Central African Republic.

== History ==
Séléka captured Ngakobo on 30 December 2012. Afterward, they looted the SUCAF factory and office. Two people were killed.

Ex-Séléka attacked Ngakobo on 2 July 2014. Three people were killed and one injured. The attack led the residents to flee to the bush. Ex-Séléka invaded Ngakobo on 27 August 2014 to kill Anti-balaka members, causing several people to die. Anti-balaka seized Ngakobo from ex-Séléka on 2 September 2014. A clash between the ex-Séléka and Anti-balaka occurred in the town on 8 September 2014. The attackers looted the traders' houses and killed nine civilians. The town faced an attack from armed groups from 7 to 10 February 2015 that caused ten civilians to die. The attack compelled some town residents to flee to the SUCAF factory.

Ex-Séléka attacked an IDP camp in Ngakobo on 4 December 2015, killing eight people and injuring several civilians. On 24 July 2016, ex-Séléka killed a teacher and two SUCAF employees, causing hundreds of the residents to seek refuge in the bush and the nearby villages. Ex-Séléka stormed the IDP camps in Ngakobo on 15 October 2016 and killed ten refugees. The locals clashed with UPC on 23 May 2017.

FACA captured Ngakobo on 9 March 2021. CPC attacked the joint FACA-Wagner forces' position in Ngakobo on 7 October 2021 for three hours, but were repelled. Three people were killed and five injured due to the attack. Ten UPC militias invaded the town's gendarme base on 29 December 2021 and occupied the town briefly before the arrival of reinforcement forces. During the occupation, the invaders looted the base.

Due to the CPC's attack at the Digui crossing in May 2022, the residents fled the town and FACA sought refuge in the MINUSCA base. CPC seized the town on 22 May 2022 after attacking FACA and killing 11 soldiers. On 8 November 2022, CPC stormed Ngakobo, causing the residents to flee to the bush. CPC attacked the FACA position in Ngakobo on 17 December 2022. They occupied the town and later withdrew.

== Economy ==
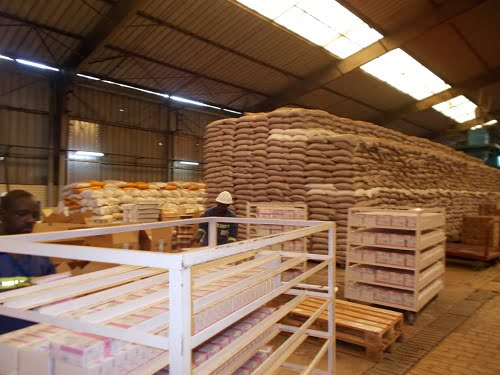
Sugar Factory

The town is home to the only sugar factory in the country and operated by SUCAF. The factory stopped its operation due to the Séléka looting in 2012. The factory resumed its operation at the end of April 2014 after MISCA and private guards arrived. Nevertheless, the factory temporarily closed in September 2014 due to the clash between two armed groups.

In 2018, the factory stopped its operation twice. On 12 January 2018, SUCAF temporarily closed its factory because of a workers' strike demanding the payment of the bonus and the resignation of the general managers. In July 2018, the factory halted its operation due to a tax payment issue.

== Education ==
Ngakobo has one elementary school that received financial support from SUCAF. The school used to be occupied by UPC before the arrival of FACA and Wagner. Besides, the town has one nursery school and a high school.

== Healthcare ==
There is a health center in the town that received support from SUCAF.

== Bibliography ==
- ACTED (21 February 2015). RRM - Rapport MSA: Site de déplacés de Ngakobo - Sous-préfecture de Bambari, Préfecture de la Ouaka (19 au 21 février 2015) (PDF) (Report).
