= Digui =

- Location in Central African Republic
- Coordinates: 5°28′20″N 20°49′44″E
- Country: Central African Republic
- Prefecture: Ouaka
- Sub-prefecture: Bambari
- Commune: Ngougbia

Population (2014)
  - Total: 1,377

Digui is a village located in Ouaka Prefecture, Central African Republic. The village is strategic since it is situated at the crossroads to Bambari, Alindao, and Ngakobo.

== History ==
The rebel group UPC used to control Digui and established a base in the village. The Portuguese contingent of MINUSCA clashed with UPC on 13 January 2019. MINUSCA and FACA forces captured Digui on 1 February 2020 from UPC.

UPC rebels attacked FACA checkpoints in Digui on 22 May 2023 and casualties were reported. A clash between FACA and Wagner Group militia ensued in Digui on 9 January 2023, resulting in the death of 4 FACA soldiers and three Wagner militiamen.

== Economy ==
The residents consist of breeders and farmers. They harvest cassava, peanuts, corn, and rice.

== Education ==
Digui does not have any schools, and the students had to go to Yangouya.

== Healthcare ==
Digui does not have health facilities and the villagers depend on traders who sell medicines. To seek medical treatment, they go to Poudjo, Alindao, or Batobadja.

== Bibliographies ==
- ACTED (29 October 2014a). Evaluation multisectorielle RRM - Prefecture de la Ouaka, Digui 9 – 10 Septembre 2014 (PDF) (Report).
- ACTED (12 September 2014b). Evaluation multisectorielle RRM Rapport Préliminaire - Digui (11 septembre 2014) (PDF) (Report).
