= Morouba, Ouaka =

Morouba
- Location in Central African Republic
- Coordinates: 6°12′44″N 20°13′17″E
- Country: Central African Republic
- Prefecture: Ouaka
- Sub-prefecture: Bakala
- Commune: Koudou-Bégo

Morouba, also written Mourouba, is a village situated 18 km from Bakala in Ouaka Prefecture, Central African Republic.

== History ==
In December 2016, UPC rebels captured Morouba. They killed three people and looted the schools, prompting the villagers to flee to Grimari. A clash in the village was reported on 2 January 2017. The villagers returned to Morouba in January 2017. FACA and Wagner captured Morouba from UPC on 10 April 2021.

== Education ==
There is a school in Morouba. The armed group reportedly used the school as a homestay in September 2016. Their presence led to damage to the building and its furniture. In January 2017, MINUSCA troops occupied the school. Later, they withdrew from the school.

== Healthcare ==
Morouba has one health post.
