= Lioto =

- Location in Central African Republic
- Coordinates: 5°18′48″N 20°9′39″E
- Country: Central African Republic
- Prefecture: Ouaka
- Sub-prefecture: Kouango
- Commune: Azengué-Mindou

Population (2022)
  - Total: 3,621

Lioto, also spelled Liotto or Lihoto, is a village situated in Ouaka Prefecture, Central African Republic.

== History ==
From June 2014 to March 2015, there had been 17 attacks in Lioto. The first attack occurred on 5 June 2014. The village received another attack on 2 and 14 July 2014, causing the displacement of the villagers to nearby settlements, Grimari and DR Congo. Later, they returned to the village. However, an armed group attacked the Fulani militia in Lioto in October 2014, causing 60 people to be killed and more than one hundred injured. During the attack, several houses were torched and the village was looted. Anti-balaka was alleged to be the attacker, yet the local group commander denied it. An armed group from Zouhougou attacked Lioto on 10 February 2015 and houses were reported burned.

UPC captured Lioto from Anti-balaka on 16 November 2016 after several hours of battle, in which ten civilians were killed and twenty houses burned. Due to the attack, the locals fled to the bush. Anti-balaka seized the village from UPC on 2 August 2018 and briefly occupied it before withdrawing. The Anti-balaka militia led by General Mandakara stormed the UPC position in Lioto on 24 February 2019. A clash between UPC and Anti-balaka ensued in Lioto on 20 June 2019 and casualties were reported on both sides.

Wagner and FACA forces attacked UPC in the village on 25 April 2022, killing two UPC rebels. UPC stormed the FACA position in the village on 11 December 2022. During the attack, the rebels seized several weapons from the government forces. The villagers sought refuge either in the bush or in Goussiema, Zouhougou, and Bangao.

== Education ==
Lioto has one primary school.

== Healthcare ==
The village does not have any health infrastructure. They have to go to Bangao for medical treatment. However, there is a plan to build a health center.

== Bibliography ==
- ACTED (31 March 2015). Rapport d’Evaluation Multisectorielle - RRM: Village de Lihoto, Sous-préfecture de Kouango, Préfecture de la Ouaka, Du 17 au 19 mars 2015 (PDF) (Report).
