= Djoubissi =

- Location in Central African Republic
- Coordinates: 6°11′43″N 20°45′47″E
- Country: Central African Republic
- Prefecture: Ouaka
- Sub-prefecture: Bambari
- Commune: Danga-Gboudou

Djoubissi, also known as Ndjoubissi, is a village situated in Ouaka Prefecture, Central African Republic.

== History ==
UPC attacked FPRC in Djoubissi on 4 December 2016. Unable to take the village from FPRC, UPC sent its reinforcement forces, which included the Mauritanian contingent forces of MINUSCA. The fight resumed on the next day and UPC seized the village from FPRC. However, the commander of the Mauritanian contingent denied that the village had been taken.

A clash between two warring armed groups ensued in Djoubissi on 9 December 2017, in which several people were killed, houses burned, and properties pillaged.

== Energy ==
Near the village, there is a gold mine.

== Education ==
There is a school in Djoubissi.

== Health ==
Djoubissi has one health post.
