= Bangao =

- Location in Central African Republic
- Coordinates: 5°16′23″N 20°10′52″E
- Country: Central African Republic
- Prefecture: Ouaka
- Sub-prefecture: Kouango
- Commune: Azengué-Mindou

Bangao is a village situated in Ouaka Prefecture, Central African Republic.

== History ==
Anti-balaka alliance of militias entered Bangao on 18 October 2014 because the locals allegedly worked for the ex-Séléka alliance. They killed many civilians and burned the coffee fields, causing the residents to flee. Some of the displaced people went to the neighboring Congo DR. A clash between two armed groups occurred in Bangao on 2 September 2015, causing the villagers to seek refuge in the bush, Pendé, and Bangao's Catholic Church.

A clash between two rival groups ensued in Bangao, leading to the killing of one person and 30 houses being torched, causing the residents to flee to the bush. Anti-balaka and UPC clashed in Bangao on 27 September 2019, killing 15 civilians and destroying 28 buildings, including a mosque.

== Education ==
Bangao has one school.

== Healthcare ==
There is a health center in the village.

== Bibliography ==
- ACTED (31 March 2015). Multi-sectoral assessment RRM preliminary report: Villages of Goussiema and Bangao, Commune of Azengué–Mindou, Sub-prefecture of Kouango, Prefecture of Ouaka (PDF) (Report). ACTED.
