= Gotchélé =

- Location in Central African Republic
- Coordinates: 5°48′24″N 20°55′22″E
- Country: Central African Republic
- Prefecture: Ouaka
- Sub-prefecture: Bambari
- Commune: Haute Baïdou

Gotchélé is a village situated in Ouaka Prefecture, Central African Republic.

== History ==
In March 2018, Gotchélé was under UPC control. CPC rebels attacked the village in March 2021 and they burned houses and looted civilian's belonging. Due to the attack, the villagers sought refuge in the bush, Kradé, Biadé, Agoudou-Manga, Boyo, Maloum, Tagbara, and Bambari.
