= Matchika massacre =

Massacre in the Central African Republic Civil War

Coordinates: 5.6384°N 20.7718°E

- Part of Central African Republic Civil War
- Location: Matchika, Ouaka, Central African Republic
- Date: 6 October 2021; 5 years ago
- Attack type: Massacre
- Deaths: 34
- Perpetrator: Union for Peace in the Central African Republic (disputed)
- Assailant: General Kiri (alleged)
- No. of participants: 15

On 6 October 2021, 34 civilians were murdered in an attack on Matchika village in the Central African Republic.

== Attack ==
On 5 October 2021 around 12:00 an 18-wheeler truck carrying passengers and goods left the city of Bambari for Alindao. At 13:00 the truck was stopped by a group of armed men. They forced the passengers to get out of the vehicle and undress. They stripped them of all their belongings. They set fire to vehicle and two motorcycles. Then they opened fire on the disembarked passengers, killing many including men, women and children. After withdrawing, the armed men killed three motorcycle drivers before disappearing. In a video shared on social media one of attackers was shouting "Allah Akbar" reportedly imitating Arabic language. Gunfire from one side was also heard. By 7 October 2021 the number of fatalities had risen to 34.

=== Responsibility ===
Initially rebels from Union for Peace in the Central African Republic led by Ali Darassa were blamed for the massacre. According to RJDH-RCA Anti-balaka fighters allied with UPC also participated in the attack. On 10 October UPC officially denied responsibility for the massacre. On 15 October CorbeauNews identified General Kiri as responsible for the massacre. He belongs to UPC splinter faction led by Hassan Bouba.
