= January 2019 Bambari clashes =

Military action in Bambari, Central African Republic

- Part of the Central African Republic Civil War
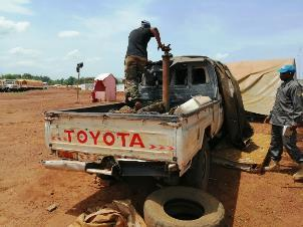
- UPC vehicle destroyed during clashes
Date	10 – 11, 17 – 19 January 2019
Location	Bambari, Ouaka, Central African Republic 5°45′55″N 20°40′27″E
Result	CAR/MINUSCA victory: MINUSCA forces conduct Operation BEKPA 2 on January 17; 40+ UPC rebels killed (per Security Council report)

Belligerents
Central African Republic; MINUSCA: Bangladesh; Portugal; Nepal; Pakistan; France (air Support) (Jan 11)	Union for Peace in the Central African Republic (UPC)

Commanders and leaders
Major Md Shahidul Islam (Bangladesh)	General Bello (WIA)

Strength
Paratroopers; Pandur and Humvee vehicles Special Forces; Peacekeepers; 1 Mi-17 helicopter 2 Mirage 2000 fighter jets Mercenaries	30 to 40 fighters Technicals

Casualties and losses
2 policemen killed, 1 wounded Unknown number of soldiers killed none	40+ killed (Security Council report) 8 technicals captured 3 suspected fighters captured
- Aid worker and teacher killed 30 injured by gunshot (1 died in hospital); 10 killed (including 2 policemen) on January 10 (per Corbeau News)
- Location within Central African Republic

In January 2019, a series of clashes occurred in the town of Bambari in the Central African Republic between Union for Peace in the Central African Republic (UPC) rebels against government and United Nations Peacekeeping forces. The clashes cumulated in Operation BEKPA 2, when United Nations forces, including Portuguese and Bangladeshi special operations forces and Nepalese Peacekeepers launched an offensive operation to secure the town.

== History ==
On January 10, 2019, UPC rebels using "heavy weaponry" launched an attack on the town of Bambari in an attempt to seize resources and to extort the local population by collecting their taxes. After the killing of two police officers and the injuring of a third, Portuguese Paratroopers deployed to the town and engaged the enemy in order to protect civilians and to restore order, the clash lasted five hours and was fought alongside Central African Forces and reportedly Russian mercenaries. During the fighting, 30 people had to be treated for gunshot wounds with one person dying in hospital. Corbeau News reported the deaths of about 10 people including the two police officers in the town. The CAR Government stated on Twitter that 20 militants had been killed and 15 were wounded, the leader of the rebels, General Bellow was wounded during the fighting according to an internal U.N. report.

On 11 January, two French Mirage 2000 fighter jets stationed in neighboring Chad conducted close air support along with two "show of force" demonstrations over Bambari in a mission that lasted four hours and required refueling from a C-135 Tanker.

After days of relative calm, Portuguese, Nepalese, and Bangladesh forces launched an attack during Operation BEKPA 2 on January 17. The fighting began at 8:00 am and lasted eight hours. UPC fighters put up resistance using heavy weapons, rocket launchers and grenades. An ammunition dump was destroyed and weapons including locally made ones and uniforms were captured, three suspected UPC rebels were detained and handed to local authorities after the operation. MINUSCA spokesmen Vladimir Monteiro told the Defense Times that Peacekeeping forces "engaged UPC elements in two Bambari Neighborhoods".

On January 19, UPC forces killed an aid worker and a teacher, Portuguese and Nepalese peacekeepers responded and clashes continued, fire was directed towards the neighborhoods of Bornou and Livestock a local resident said.
