= Maloum, Central African Republic =

Maloum
- Location in Central African Republic
- Coordinates: 5°50′52″N 21°3′40″E
- Country: Central African Republic
- Prefecture: Ouaka
- Sub-prefecture: Bambari
- Commune: Danga-Gboudou

Maloum is a village located in Ouaka Prefecture, Central African Republic.

== History ==
Anti-balaka attacked the UPC position in the village on 21 March 2018. There are two theories regarding the motive of Anti-balaka's attack, which were the possible presence of Ali Darassa or an attempt to steal cattle. Due to the clash between two rebel groups, the villagers fled, and ten civilians were killed.

UPC rebels attacked Wagner Group mercenaries 10 km from Maloum's southern entrance on 3 September 2021. Wagner drove the rebels to the village center. As a result, the locals sought refuge in the bush to secure themselves from being rebel targets. Wagner visited Maloum on 9 September 2021 and arrested five people who had connections to the UPC.

Four unknown militias attacked Maloum on 25 November 2022 at 8 PM. They looted shops and some houses. Locals accused CPC rebels of masterminding the attack. However, CPC denied involvement.

== Demographics ==
The village is predominantly inhabited by Fula.

== Economy ==
Maloum has one weekly market.

== Education ==
Maloum has one school.

== Healthcare ==
There is one health center in the village.
