= Margaret Nicholl Laird =

American missionary

Margaret Nicholl Laird (31 July 1897 – June 1983) was an American missionary of the Baptist Mid-Missions who worked in the French colony of Ubangi-Shari and independent Central African Republic (CAR) from 1922 until the 1960s. She was one of the founders and longest serving missionaries of the Baptist Mid-Missions in the CAR. In recognition of her service as a medical missionary and her many other activities in the CAR, Margaret was awarded the French Legion of Honor (1952), the Central African Republic Knight of the Order of Merit (1961), the Distinguished Alumni of the Year of the Women's College of Colorado (1962), and the Anna Eleanor Roosevelt Memorial Award for the Daughters of Hadassah (1962).

== Childhood and early adulthood ==
Born Margaret Suzanne Nicholl in Englewood, Colorado to a Finnish Lutheran mother and an Irish Episcopalian father, Margaret was baptized in the Lutheran Church three days after birth. She attended Colorado Women's College in Denver, Colorado, where she joined the Bible class of one of her teachers, Miss Jessie Robbins. On 16 September 1917, she entered Moody Bible School, from which she graduated in on 7 August 1919. She then returned to Denver to study to be a nurse in order to qualify as a medical missionary. Although offered a salary by several evangelical missionary societies, she was inspired by the example of Hudson Taylor, founder of the China Inland Mission, to become a faith missionary, with no regular income. With the initial financial support of the Hoover family of her church in Englewood, Colorado, Margaret decided to join Reverend William Haas who was organizing a Baptist Mid-Missions missionary group to start work in the French colony of Ubangi-Shari.

== First years in Ubangi-Shari ==
After briefly studying French in Paris, she traveled to Ubangi-Shari and arrived in the town of Fort-Sibut in 1922, where she joined Baptist Mid-Mission missionary Rosenau. After studying the Sango language at Fort-Sibut for only four months, she was asked by the director of the mission, Mr. Haas, to move to the town of Bangassou in southeastern CAR to run a French school which the French colonial administration wanted to have opened there. In Bonjanou she came to know another missionary named Guy Laird, a widower with a young son named Lawrence. Although initially reluctant to marry a man who had already had another wife, she soon overcame these reservations and married Guy Laird in 1924. In 1925 Margaret gave birth to Eleanor Louise, who died only four months later. In 1927, while on furlough in Englewood, Colorado, Margaret gave birth to a daughter, Arlene, and in 1928, two weeks after returning to Fort-Sibut in Ubangi-Shari, she gave birth to another daughter, Marian; her son Clifford was born in 1931.

== Working as a nurse at Ippy ==
In 1928, Fort-Sibut's local French administrator Félix Éboué asked the Lairds to open a mission station among the Banda people of central Ubangi-Shari at a town called Ippy in Ouaka Region. The French wanted the Lairds to help gain the trust of the Banda in this region where diamonds and gold had been found and was beginning to be exploited. The Lairds moved to Ippy, where Guy worked until his death in 1945; Margaret stayed on as a nurse until 1964. The dispensary she helped establish at Ippy became an important medical center for the whole region. She described her life as a missionary in the CAR in a book entitled They Called Me Mama (1975).

== Working on Sango materials ==
Margaret Laird contributed significantly to the preparation of the Bible in the Sango language.

== Family ==
Laird’s great-nephew is missionary and adventurer Spencer Nicholl.
