= Batobadja =

- Location in Central African Republic
- Coordinates: 5°34′33″N 20°49′11″E
- Country: Central African Republic
- Prefecture: Ouaka
- Sub-prefecture: Bambari
- Commune: Ngougbia

Population (2022)
  - Total: 1,985

Batobadja is a village situated in Ouaka Prefecture, Central African Republic.

== History ==
An armed group invaded Batobadja on 21 and 22 September 2014 and pillaged the health center’s pharmacy, causing the death of one person. An armed Peuhl militia killed 21 people in Batobadja in the second week of October 2014. On 18 October, ex-Séléka attacked Anti-balaka positions in Batobadja to retaliate the attack of two Muslim-owned vehicles in the village three days before, causing the villagers to seek refuge in Notre Dame des Victoires, Bambari.

Anti-balaka militias stormed the Peuhl camp in Batobadja on 20 December 2014 and killed ten people, including seven ex-Séléka fighters, two civilians, and one Anti-balaka member. Fourteen houses were torched down and several injured civilians were transported to Bambari.

CPC rebels attacked Batobadja on 30 December 2021, resulting in the villagers fleeing to Bambari and Matchika. As the village emptied, the rebels looted civilian properties, including goats.

== Education ==
There is one school in the village.

== Healthcare ==
Batobadja has one health post.

== Bibliographies ==
- ACTED (23 March 2022). République centrafricaine : Rapport d’intervention EHA - Mécanisme de Réponse Rapide-RRM Batobadja Commune Ngougbia, Sous-Préfecture de Bambari, Préfecture Ouaka (du 28 au 30 Janvier 2022) (PDF) (Report). ACTED.
- ACTED (20 January 2018). RCA RRM : Evaluation Multisectorielle à Batobadja (Préfecture de la Ouaka), Rapport préliminaire (ACTED/23.01.2018) (PDF) (Report). ACTED.
