= Bokolobo =

- Location in Central African Republic
- Coordinates: 5°25′7″N 20°56′43″E
- Country: Central African Republic
- Prefecture: Ouaka
- Sub-prefecture: Bambari
- Commune: Ngougbia

Bokolobo is a village located in the Central African Republic prefecture of Ouaka.

== History ==
Bokolobo used to be the headquarters of the UPC rebel group. On 12 and 13 January 2019, Portuguese paratroopers raided the UPC base in Bokolobo, seizing a number of weapons and destroying some checkpoints. On 8 March 2021, it was captured by government forces.
