= Matchika =

- Location in Central African Republic
- Coordinates: 5°38′14″N 20°46′19″E
- Country: Central African Republic
- Prefecture: Ouaka
- Sub-prefecture: Bambari
- Commune: Ngougbia

Matchika is a village located in Ouaka Prefecture, Central African Republic.

== History ==
In October 2014, ex-Séléka militia led by General Ali Darassa attacked Matchika. They killed several people and burned the houses. As a result, the villagers fled to the bush.

34 civilians were murdered in the Matchika massacre during an attack on a bus on 5 October 2021.

== Economy ==
Matchika has a market that was inaugurated on 10 February 2024.

== Education ==
The village has one school.

== See also ==
- Matchika massacre
