= Fort de Possel =

1906 French colonial capital of Ubangi-Shari

Coordinates: 5°1′29.7″N 19°15′30.9″E

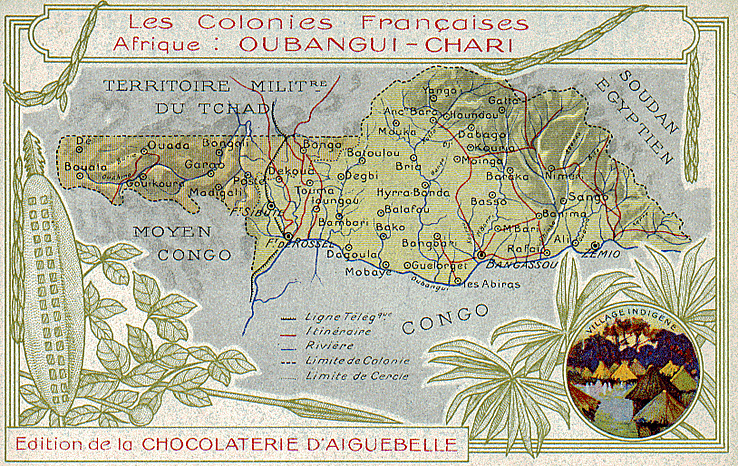
A map of Ubangi-Shari c. 1910 showing the location of Ft. de Possel in the southwestern corner of the colony.

Fort de Possel (French: Fort-de-Possel) was a French garrison and settlement in central Africa which served as the capital of Ubangi-Shari from February 11 to December 11, 1906. It lies on the northern shore of the main bend of the Ubangi River at the mouth of the much smaller Kémo River. Its importance derived from the use of the Kémo in provisioning Fort Sibut and linking the Ubangi trade with Lake Chad. It was gradually superseded in importance by Bangui further downstream at the head of the navigable portion of the river.

The settlement was founded in 1891 by the agriculturalist Jean Dybowski as Kemo (Kémo) and moved to its present site in 1899. In 1900, it was renamed for Marshal Possel-Deydier, who was killed in combat against Rabih az-Zubayr at Kouno the year before. It possessed no proper fortifications whatsoever and largely consisted of a central quad surrounded by huts and official buildings. It was the site of the confinement of Adam ‘Asil, the Wadai rebel, when he was detained by the French in 1903.

The locality at the site is now known simply as Possel, part of the commune of Galafondo, prefecture of Kémo in the Central African Republic. Located on the bank of the Ubangi River, it is upstream from Bangui and the Elephant and Makongué rapids, at the confluence of the Kémo River. It is also known by the name of Gigi.
