= Gambo, Central African Republic =

Gambo
- Location in Central African Republic
- Coordinates: 4°39′32″N 22°15′19″E
- Country: Central African Republic
- Prefecture: Mbomou
- Sub-prefecture: Gambo

Government
  - Sub-Prefect: Dieudonné Ouenengaisse

Gambo is a town located in the Central African Republic prefecture of Mbomou. The town is named after Gambo, a Nzakara chief who ruled the area in the years before 1931.

== History ==
On 18 March 2013 Gambo was captured by Séléka rebels. In April 2015 Gambo was reported to be under control of Union for Peace in the Central African Republic. In November 2016 Gambo was reportedly under control of Anti-balaka. On 3 August 2017 heavy clashes erupted between Anti-balaka and UPC in the city resulting in 30 civilians and six volunteers from Red Cross killed and 150 houses being burnt. On 30 July 2018 Anti-balaka attacked UN convoy in Gambo injuring two Egyptian peacekeepers. On 6 May 2021 the town was recaptured by government forces.
