= Bimbo, Central African Republic =

Bimbo
- Location in Central African Republic
- Coordinates: 4°15′21″N 18°24′15″E
- Country: Central African Republic
- Prefecture: Bangui
- Sub-Prefecture: Bangui-Kagas
- Elevation: 1,109 ft (338 m)

Population (2013)
  - Total: 267,859

Bimbo (also, Bimo) is the second-largest city of the Central African Republic, located southwest of the capital, Bangui. Bimbo had a population of 124,176 as of the 2003 census and a calculated 2013 population of 267,859. Bimbo used to be the capital city of Ombella-M'Poko until December 2020. Since December 2020, Bimbo has been part of Bangui Prefecture.

Bimbo is the site of the country's only sex-segregated women's prison, Bimbo Central Prison. The prison was built in 1980 to hold 200 prisoners, although as of 2005 it only held 44, most of whom were pre-trial detainees.

== History ==
Bimbo was founded in 1908.

On 20 November 1964, Bimbo became the capital of Ombella-M'Poko for two years until it was replaced by Boali. However, Bimbo was reinstated as the capital of Ombella-M'Poko in 1969. On 10 December 2020, Bimbo was transferred from Ombella-M'Poko prefecture to Bangui prefecture, and once again Boali became the capital of Ombella-M'Poko.

== Climate ==
Köppen-Geiger climate classification system classifies its climate as tropical wet and dry (Aw).

The highest record temperature was 44 °C (111 °F) on February 25, 2004, while the lowest record temperature was 3 °C (37 °F) on January 22, 1993.

Climate data for Bimbo
Month	Jan	Feb	Mar	Apr	May	Jun	Jul	Aug	Sep	Oct	Nov	Dec	Year
Record high °C (°F)	39 (102)	44 (111)	42 (108)	40 (104)	39 (102)	39 (102)	40 (104)	38 (100)	40 (104)	38 (100)	41 (106)	39 (102)	44 (111)
Mean daily maximum °C (°F)	31.8 (89.2)	33.4 (92.1)	32.8 (91.0)	32.2 (90.0)	31.5 (88.7)	30.2 (86.4)	30 (86)	29.7 (85.5)	30.2 (86.4)	30.5 (86.9)	30.8 (87.4)	31.2 (88.2)	31.2 (88.1)
Daily mean °C (°F)	25.2 (77.4)	26.4 (79.5)	26.7 (80.1)	26.6 (79.9)	26.2 (79.2)	25.3 (77.5)	25 (77)	24.9 (76.8)	25.1 (77.2)	25.3 (77.5)	25.1 (77.2)	24.6 (76.3)	25.5 (78.0)
Mean daily minimum °C (°F)	18.6 (65.5)	19.5 (67.1)	20.7 (69.3)	21 (70)	20.9 (69.6)	20.4 (68.7)	20 (68)	20.2 (68.4)	20 (68)	20.1 (68.2)	19.5 (67.1)	18.1 (64.6)	19.9 (67.9)
Record low °C (°F)	3 (37)	8 (46)	13 (55)	5 (41)	11 (52)	16 (61)	12 (54)	8 (46)	10 (50)	11 (52)	12 (54)	10 (50)	3 (37)
Average precipitation mm (inches)	22 (0.9)	41 (1.6)	107 (4.2)	124 (4.9)	169 (6.7)	151 (5.9)	193 (7.6)	229 (9.0)	191 (7.5)	195 (7.7)	94 (3.7)	32 (1.3)	1,548 (61)
Source 1: Climate-Data.org, altitude: 365m
Source 2: Voodoo Skies for records

== See also ==
- List of cities in the Central African Republic
- Prefectures of the Central African Republic
