= Ouaka River =

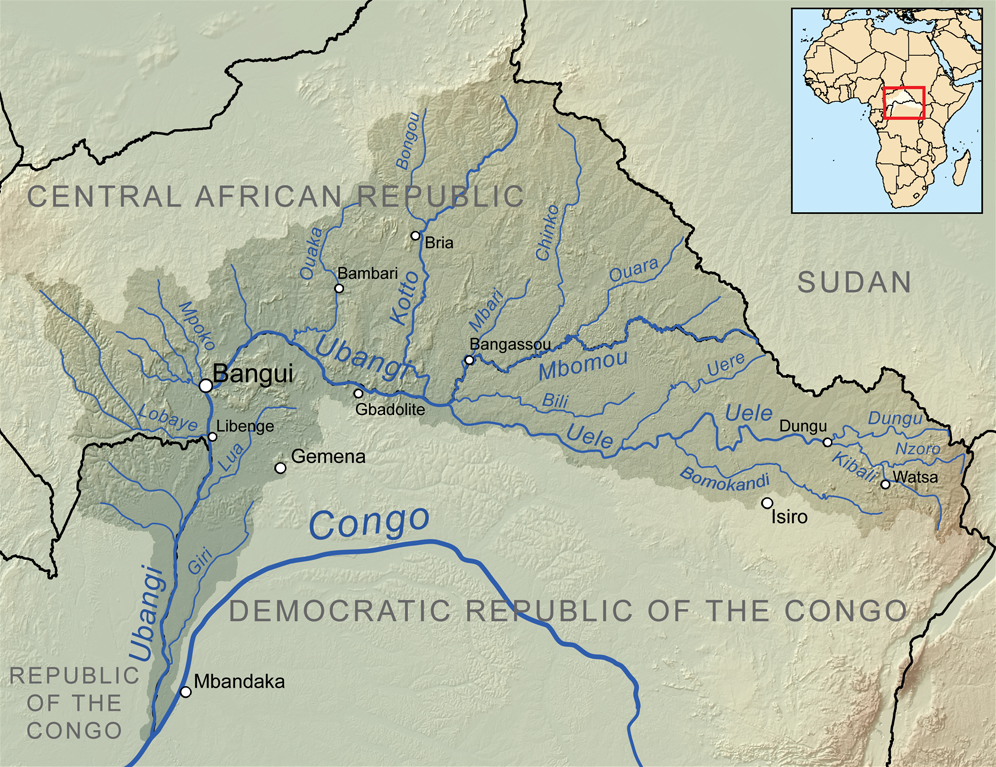

Location
- Country: Central African Republic

Physical characteristics
- Source: Southwest of Ouadda
  - coordinates: 7°3′32″N 21°35′24″E
  - elevation: 684 m
- Length: 611 km (380 mi)

The River Ouaka is a tributary of the Ubangi River in the Central African Republic, itself a tributary of the Congo River, and runs through Bambari, the capital of Ouaka Prefecture.

== See also ==
- List of rivers of the Central African Republic
