= Valentine Rugwabiza =

Rwandan businesswoman and politician

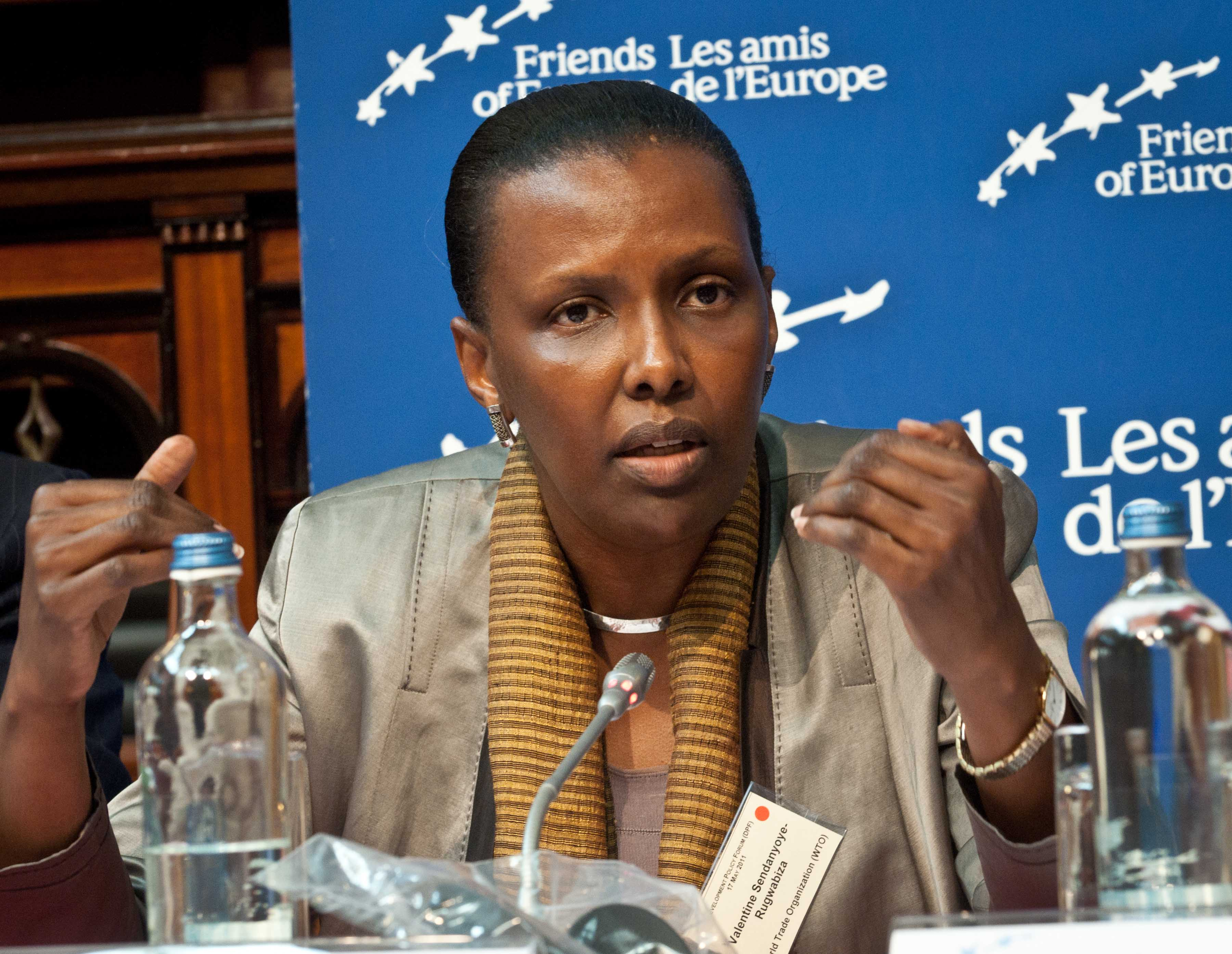
- Rugwabiza in 2011

Special Representative of the Secretary-General for the Central African Republic and Head of the United Nations

Ambassador
- Incumbent
- Assumed office 23 February 2022
- Appointed by: António Guterres
- Preceded by: Mankeur Ndiaye

Permanent Representative of Rwanda to United Nations
- In office November 2016 – February 2022
- Appointed by: Paul Kagame

Deputy Director General of the World Trade Organization
- In office 2005–2013

Personal details
- Born: 25 July 1963 (age 63) Rwanda
- Spouse: John Paulin Sendanyoye
- Education: National University of Zaire
- Occupation: Economist, Businesswoman

Valentine Sendanyoye Rugwabiza (born 25, July 1963) is a Rwandan businesswoman and politician who has served as the country's Permanent Representative to the United Nations from 2016 to 2018. She is now the Special Representative of the Secretary-General and head of MINUSCA, the United Nations peacekeeping mission in the Central African Republic.

== Early life and education ==
Rugwabiza was born on 25 July 1963. She has a bachelor's and a master's degree in economics from the National University of Zaire.

== Career ==
For eight years, Rugwabiza worked for Swiss multinational company Hoffmann-La Roche, first as the head of commercial development and marketing for Central Africa in Yaoundé, and then as regional director in Ivory Coast. She returned to Kigali in 1997 to run her own company, Synergy Group.

In 2002, Rugwabiza was appointed Rwanda's ambassador to Switzerland and Permanent Representative to the UN Office in Geneva, serving for three years.

From 2005 until 2013, Rugwabiza was Deputy Director-General of the World Trade Organization, the first woman to hold the position. She is a founding member of the Rwanda Private Sector Federation, the Rwanda Women Entrepreneurs’ Organization and the Rwandese Women Leaders’ Caucus.

Rugwabiza was CEO of the Rwanda Development Board from 2013 to 2014. She served as Minister for East African Community from 2014 to 2016. In 2015, she was named as one of Jeune Afrique's "50 powerful women in Africa."

Rugwabiza was appointed Rwanda's Permanent Representative to the United Nations by President Paul Kagame in November 2016. She remains a member of the Cabinet of Rwanda and was a member of the East African Legislative Assembly for a five-year term from 2012 until June 2017.

In February 2022, the UN announced that Valentine Rugwabiza would replace the Senegalese Mankeur Ndiaye at the head of Minusca, the United Nations peacekeeping mission in the Central African Republic.

== Personal life ==
Rugwabiza is married to John Paulin Sendanyoye.

== See also ==
- Cabinet of Rwanda

== Publications ==
- Rugwabiza, Valentine (2008). "Urgency of Completing the Doha Round more Acute than Ever". In United Nations Office for ECOSOC Support and Coordination (ed.). Achieving Sustainable Development and Promoting Development Cooperation: Dialogues at the Economic and Social Council. United Nations Publications. pp. 43–45. ISBN 9789211045871.
- Rugwabiza, Valentine; González, Arancha (11 May 2016). "Economic integration is helping boost trade and investment in Africa". The Guardian.
- Rugwabiza, Valentine (18 July 2016). "Africa: Amidst Brexit Woes, Africa Forges Ahead With Integration". The New Times. All Africa.
- Rugwabiza, Valentine (17 July 2016). "Britain may have given up on the EU dream, but Africa still wants integration". The Guardian.
