= Church of Fatima, Bangui =

Religious building in Central African Republic

Church of Fatima
- Église de Fatima de Bangui
- Church of Fatima
- 4°21′55″N 18°32′07″E
- Location: Bangui
- Country: Central African Republic
- Denomination: Roman Catholic Church

The Church of Fatima,(French: Eglise de Fatima de Bangui) is a Roman Catholic church located in Bangui, in the Central African Republic.

It is situated in the neighborhood known as PK5, which is 5 km away from the center of the city.

On May 28, 2014, the Séléka, a paramilitary rebel movement, threw grenades before shooting indiscriminately at the church, killing at least 11 people.

On 1 May 2018, PK5 self-defense forces led by Amineri Matar (aka “Force”) stormed the Church of Fatima, killing 27 people and wounding 170.
