= Bahamo =

- Location in Central African Republic
- Coordinates: 6°07′N 21°07′E
- Country: Central African Republic
- Prefecture: Ouaka
- District: Ippy

Bahamo is a town located in Ouaka Prefecture, Central African Republic.
