= Bangui (prefecture) =

Prefecture of the Central African Republic

- Prefecture
- Bangui in the Central African Republic
- Country: Central African Republic
- Capital: Bangui

Area
  - Total: 3,260 km^{2} (1,260 sq mi)

Population (2022 estimation)
  - Total: 1,425,276
  - Density: 437/km^{2} (1,130/sq mi)

Bangui is a prefecture in the Central African Republic. The prefecture has an estimated population of 1,425,276 in 2022 and an area of 3,260 km^{2}. Bangui is the capital of the prefecture.

== History ==
On 10 December 2020, Bangui Prefecture was created. Two communes that were previously part of Ombella-M'Poko, Begoua and Bimbo, were transferred to Bangui Prefecture.

== Administration ==
Bangui is divided into 4 sub-prefectures and 11 communes:

Sub Prefecture	Commune	Population (2022 estimation)
Bangui-Rapides	1st arrondissement	n/a
Bangui-Rapides	7th arrondissement	n/a
Bangui-Rapides	Landja	n/a
Bangui-Fleuve	2nd arrondissement	n/a
Bangui-Fleuve	6th arrondissement	n/a
Bangui-Fleuve	Bimbo	n/a
Bangui-Centre	3rd arrondissement	n/a
Bangui-Centre	5th arrondissement	n/a
Bangui-Kagas	4th arrondissement	n/a
Bangui-Kagas	8th arrondissement	n/a
Bangui-Kagas	Bégoua	n/a
