= Ippy =

- Location in Central African Republic
- Coordinates: 6°15′N 21°12′E
- Country: Central African Republic
- Prefecture: Ouaka
- District: Ippy District

Government
  - Sub-Prefect: Charles Chrysler Yombenendji
  - Mayor: Constant Raoul Guianikouzou

Population
  - Total: 16,571

Ippy is a town located in the Central African Republic prefecture of Ouaka, near the geographic center of the country. It is 364 kilometers (226 miles) from the city of Bangui directly. Driving distance, however, is 496 kilometers (308 miles).

Ippy has a car rental service which is popular among tourists visiting the town.

== History ==
The Ippy Hospital was founded by American missionary Margaret Nicholl Laird with facilities including 60 beds, two operating theaters and a 1,000 English-language medical textbook library. Laird herself worked at the hospital until 1964. The hospital has been described as a "shell of its former self".

=== Civil war ===
On 22 December 2012 Séléka rebels took control of Ippy. In 2014 it was reported that Ippy was under control of Ali Darassa's UPC. On 6 October 2017 UPC, FPRC and Anti-balaka signed ceasefire in Ippy. On the 12th of December, 2017, Ippy Hospital was subject to an attack by the armed groups UPC and FPRC. Combatants fired indiscriminately on civilian personnel and patients, killing twelve men, one woman, three children, and one baby. On 29 January 2019 18 people were killed and 23 wounded when UPC fighters opened fire during funeral ceremony in Ippy On 19 February 2021 government forces took control of the town.
