= Bakala, Central African Republic =

Bakala
- Sub-prefecture and town
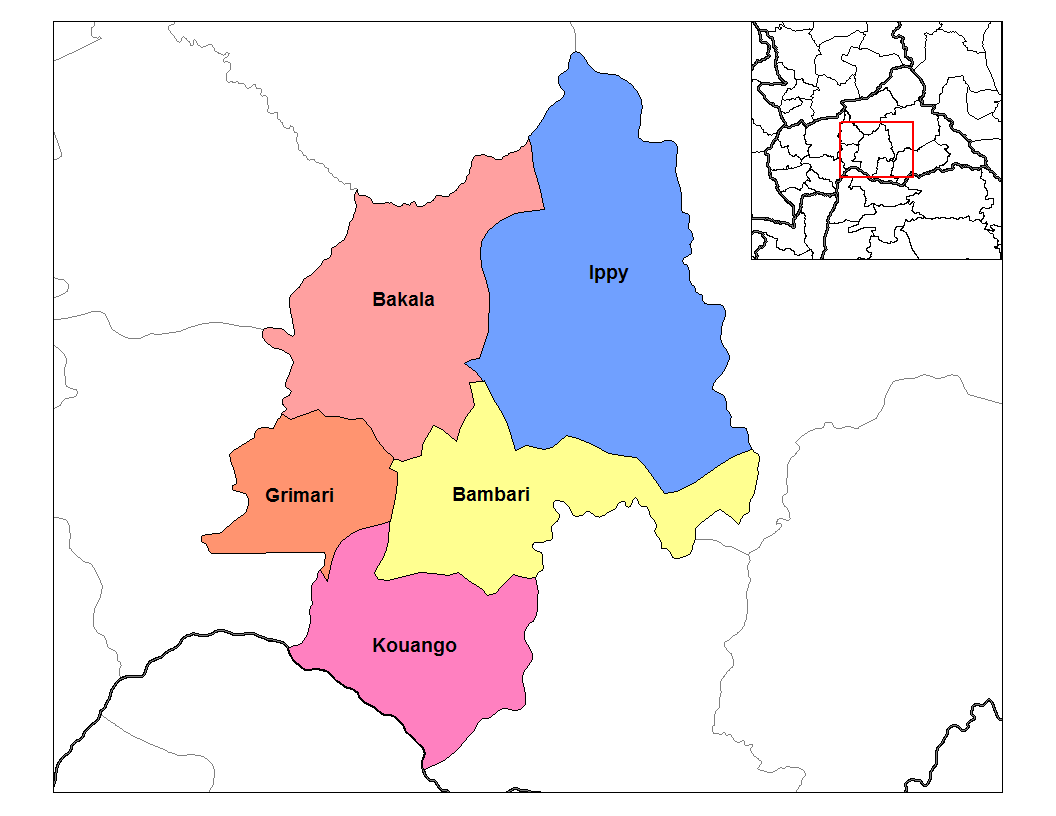
- Sub-prefectures of Ouaka

- Location in the Central African Republic
- Coordinates: 6°11′N 20°22′E
- Country: Central African Republic
- Prefecture: Ouaka

Government
  - Sub-Prefect: Mahamat Awat
- Time zone: UTC+1 (WAT)

Bakala is a sub-prefecture and town in the Ouaka Prefecture of the southern-central Central African Republic. It is located near the geographic center of the country.

== History ==
On 30 November 2016, FPRC armed group captured Bakala from UPC group after battle. It was recaptured by UPC on 11 December, but snatched again by FPRC on 11 January 2017. In April 2017 Bakala was reportedly under the joint control of FPRC and Anti-balaka. The town was recaptured by government forces on 10 April 2021.
