= Grimari =

- Location in Central African Republic
- Coordinates: 5°43′N 20°3′E
- Country: Central African Republic
- Prefecture: Ouaka

Government
  - Sub-Prefect: Maxime Gbolokouzou
- Elevation: 476 m (1,562 ft)

Population
  - Total: 16 486

Grimari is a city located in the Ouaka prefecture in Central African Republic, approximately 222.7 kilometres (138.4 mi) away from the capital, Bangui. The politician Abel Goumba was born in Grimari.

== History ==
On March 1, 1910, Grimari replaced Pouyamba as the capital of the subdivision in the district of Kémo. This subdivision was attached to the constituency of Bambari from 1 January 1920. In 1930, the African Textile Company set up a ginning factory. This cotton company would become Cotonaf.

After World War II, the administrative reform of October 16, 1946 made Grimari the district capital of the Ouaka-Kotto region. On January 23, 1961, the independent Central African Republic established the city of Grimari as the capital of the sub-prefecture.

On April 13, 2014, the Anti-Balaka attacked the Séléka in Grimari with many people being killed and displaced. Anti-Balaka forces reportedly took control of the town.

On August 31, 2016, Anti-Balaka forces in Grimari erected roadblocks preventing a MINUSCA convoy from moving and forcing them to return to Bambari. In November 2016 Grimari was reported to be under control of security forces including police and gendarmerie.

On March 15, 2020, Anti-Balaka forces attacked a MINUSCA base in Grimari, killing one peacekeeper. On August 3, Anti-Balaka forces attacked Grimari blocking roads to Sibut and Bambari. FACA managed to recapture the city the same day, killing one Anti-Balaka commander. On December 20, rebels from Union for Peace in the Central African Republic took control of the centre of Grimari after bypassing a MINUSCA roadblock. On January 9, 2021, rebels attacked Grimari. However, government forces were reportedly in control of the town. On January 15, rebels ambushed peacekeepers in the town of Grimari, killing a peacekeeper from Burundi and injuring two Bangladeshi peacekeepers.
