= Ali Darassa =

Nigerian military personnel (born 1978)

Ali Darassa Mahamat
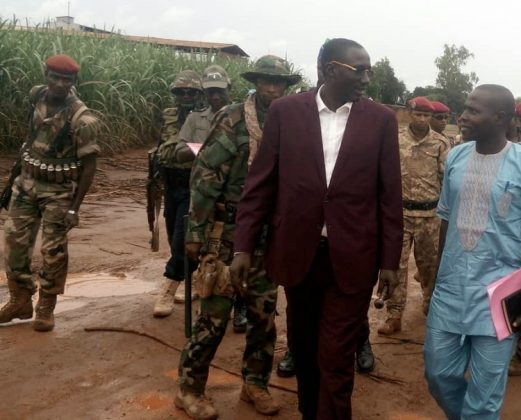
- Ali Darassa (in purple suit) surrounded by his men in Ngakobo
- Born: 22 September 1978 (age 47); Central African Republic
- Other names: Ali Daras, Ali Darrassa, Ali, Ali Darassa Mahamant
- Military career
- Allegiance: Union for Peace in the Central African Republic
- Service years: 2014–2025

Ali Darassa Mahamat (born 22 September 1978), also known as Ali Daras and Ali Ndarass is a Nigerian leader of the Central African rebel group, the Union for Peace in the Central African Republic (UPC), which is dominant around Bambari. He is an ethnic Fula and his UPC is largely Fula. Darassa was the right-hand man of Chadian rebel leader, Abdel Kader Baba-Laddé until Baba-Laddé abandoned his armed struggle in September 2012. The UPC is an Ex-Séléka faction made up of disbanded members of the former rebel coalition known as Séléka. Starting in November 2016, another Ex-Séléka faction, the FPRC, allied with their former enemy, the Anti-balaka, and attacked UPC. The fighting displaced 20,000 and was ethnic in nature with the FPRC singling out Fulani people. He is reportedly well studied in past UN peacekeeping missions in order to deal with the peacekeeping mission known as MINUSCA in the country.

On 17 December 2021, the U.S. Department of the Treasury said in a statement that it was seizing all of Ali Darassa's US assets, and criminalizing transactions with him "for serious human rights abuses", stemming from his leadership of the UPC.

On 21 September 2023, the Bangui Court of Appeal sentenced Darassa in absentia to a life sentence of forced labor for “conspiracy” and “rebellion”. Darassa is condemned for his role in the Coalition of Patriots for Change (CPC).

On 10 July 2025, Darassa surrendered before president Faustin-Archange Touadéra in Bangui and announced the end of his group's rebellion in a ceremony in Bangui.

== See also ==
- Séléka
- Anti-balaka
