= Corbeau News Centrafrique =

French-language news site from the Central African Republic

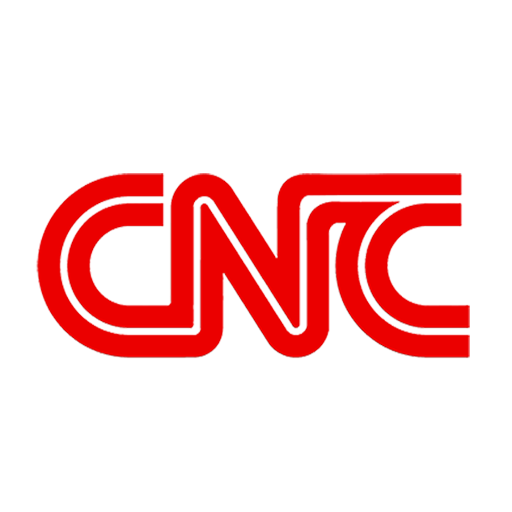
- Logo of Corbeau News
- Format: Online website
- Editor: "Alain Nzilo"
- Founded: June 2014
- Website: corbeaunews-centrafrique.org

Corbeau News Centrafrique, abbreviated CNC, is a French-language news site from the Central African Republic.

The website was created in June 2014 by "Alain Nzilo", a journalist from the Central African Republic. The site employs multiple reporters in different provinces of the country. Corbeau News is considered to be independent news media by the Foreign Policy Research Institute. Stanford University and the BBC also consider it a reliable source.

== History ==
The site owner was reportedly contacted by Russian paramilitaries with the aim of changing his editorial policies.

The Russian embassy in the country has labelled the station as "anti-Russian propaganda".

As of February 2021 the site has been blocked by the Central African government for publishing "fake news" during the Central African Republic Civil War. Reporters Without Borders condemned the blocking of the site and called for the news sites to be restored.

In January 2022, the website was viewed about 66,000 times, 30% of its traffic coming from the USA, 23% from Ethiopia, 16% from France, 10% from Belgium, 9% from Norway and so on. The website's content was also shared through two Facebook channels.

== Publisher ==
The website's publisher and Editor-in-Chief, "Alain Nzilo", which is a pseudonym for Bienvenu Patric Rebaile Dalement an assistant researcher at the University of Quebec He was the head of the Mouvement pour la Démocratie et l’Evolution Sociale opposition party which was established in 2003. Le Meridien investigation accused Corbeau News for consistent anti-Touadéra views. According to an ANCIR Labs investigation Corbeau News "proactively publishes articles to highlight the atrocities committed by Russian mercenaries in the country"..

== See also ==
- List of newspapers in the Central African Republic
- cnn-globalnews.com
- cnn-internationaledition.com
- Website spoofing

== Bibliography ==
- LN (December 2024). "Fake News: CAR's Corbeau News Centrafrique Faces Backlash". Leadership. Archived from the original on 2024-11-05.
- ANCIR iLAB (2022-01-13). "Friend or foe? How the Central African Republic's media reports on Russia". Disinfo.Africa. Archived from the original on 2026-05-12.
- Rebaile Dalemet, Bienvenu Patric (2011-08-29). "Mouvement pour la Démocratie et l'Evolution Sociale". MDES Centrafrique (in French). Archived from the original on 2025-04-16.
