= Sibut =

- City
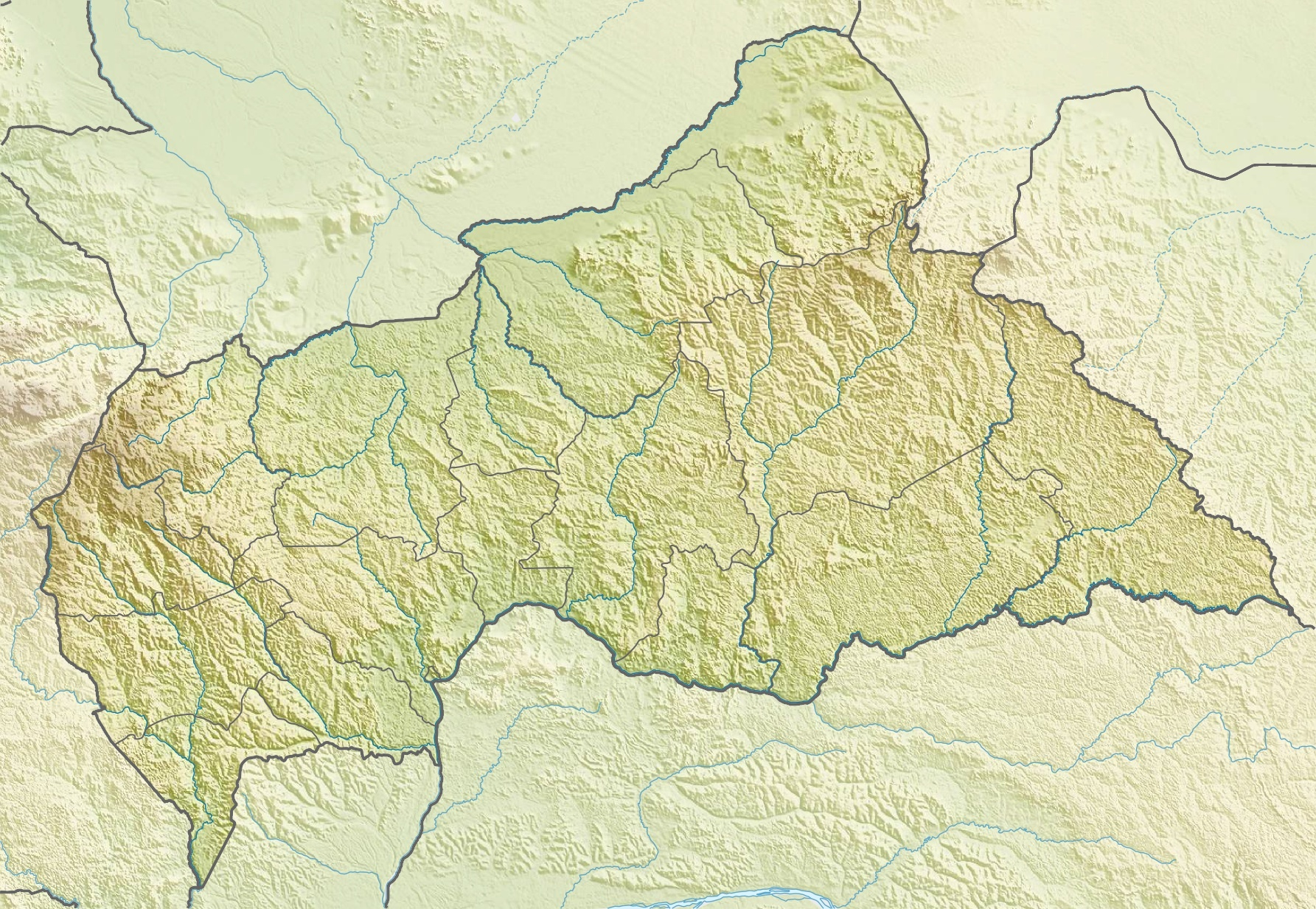
- Location in the Central African Republic
- Coordinates: 5°44′16″N 19°05′12″E
- Country: Central African Republic
- Prefecture: Kémo

Government
  - Sub-Prefect: Ernest Ouaka-Mondjou
- Elevation: 400 m (1,300 ft)

Population (2012)
  - Total: 24,527
- Time zone: UTC+01:00 (WAT)

Sibut (French pronunciation: [siby(t)]), formerly Fort Sibut (French: Fort-Sibut) is the capital of Kémo, one of the 16 prefectures of the Central African Republic. An important transport hub, it is situated 188 km (117 mi) north of the capital Bangui and is known for its market.

Sibut is located at the Northern end of the paved road coming from the capital, Bangui. At Sibut, two major provincial roads split, one going North to Kaga Bandoro, and the other east towards Bomimi, a thriving agricultural village of 450 people, 12 km (7.5 mi) from Sibut.

== History ==
The settlement was originally named Krébédjé after the local Dekpa chief of the same name. The French arrived in 1895 and Krébédjé, and they officially recognised him as chief the next year.

The town was renamed Fort Sibut in 1900 after Medical Major Adolphe Pierre Sibut, a deceased friend of colonial official Émile Gentil.

Sibut sits on the banks of the Kémo, a minor tributary of the Ubangi River about 150 km (93 mi) long. Formerly an important route of supply and communication between Fort de Possel on the Ubangi and the French settlements around Lake Chad, the river is now non-navigable even with small watercraft.

In 1952, American Baptist missionary Margery Benedict established a medical clinic and dispensary at Fort Sibut. In 1982, President Andre Kolingba traveled to Sibut to award her the Order of Gratitude for 30 years of service.

In 1980, Sibut was electrified.

The present city has one high school which also serves as a landing strip, and a market. Local food in street cafes include gozo (cassava) and peanut spinach sauce, along with various species of bushmeat. Local drink includes palm wine and 33 beer. The Peace Corps had volunteers located in Sibut until the coup d'état of 1996.

On 29 December 2012 the city was captured by Seleka rebels. On 2 February 2014 Anti-balaka took control of the city following Seleka withdrawal. In May 2018 Central African Armed Forces were redeployed in the city with help of Russian instructors.

== Climate ==
Köppen-Geiger climate classification system classifies its climate as tropical wet and dry (Aw).

Climate data for Sibut
Month	Jan	Feb	Mar	Apr	May	Jun	Jul	Aug	Sep	Oct	Nov	Dec	Year
Mean daily maximum °C (°F)	34.9 (94.8)	36.1 (97.0)	35.4 (95.7)	34.1 (93.4)	33 (91)	31.4 (88.5)	30.3 (86.5)	30.7 (87.3)	31.3 (88.3)	31.9 (89.4)	33 (91)	33.9 (93.0)	33.0 (91.3)
Daily mean °C (°F)	25.3 (77.5)	26.6 (79.9)	27.5 (81.5)	27 (81)	26.5 (79.7)	25.4 (77.7)	24.7 (76.5)	24.9 (76.8)	25.3 (77.5)	25.5 (77.9)	25.3 (77.5)	24.9 (76.8)	25.7 (78.4)
Mean daily minimum °C (°F)	15.7 (60.3)	17.1 (62.8)	19.6 (67.3)	20 (68)	20 (68)	19.4 (66.9)	19.1 (66.4)	19.2 (66.6)	19.3 (66.7)	19.2 (66.6)	17.6 (63.7)	16 (61)	18.5 (65.4)
Average precipitation mm (inches)	8 (0.3)	24 (0.9)	70 (2.8)	93 (3.7)	140 (5.5)	167 (6.6)	216 (8.5)	223 (8.8)	206 (8.1)	187 (7.4)	48 (1.9)	14 (0.6)	1,396 (55.1)
Source: Climate-Data.org, altitude: 428m

== See also ==
- List of cities in the Central African Republic
- Prefectures of the Central African Republic
- Lake Chad replenishment project
- Waterway
