= Bria, Central African Republic =

Bria
- City
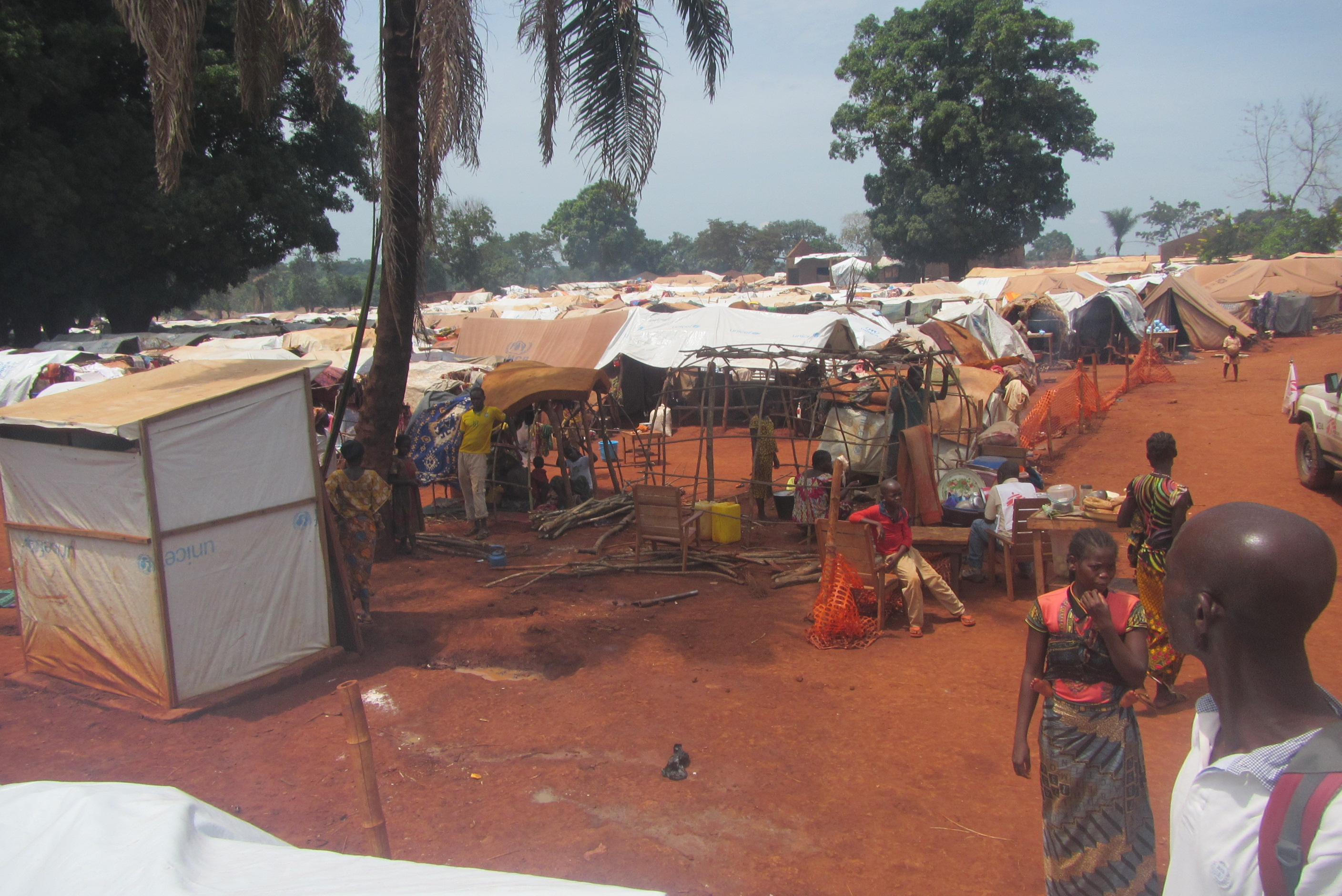
- Refugees camp in PK3, Bria

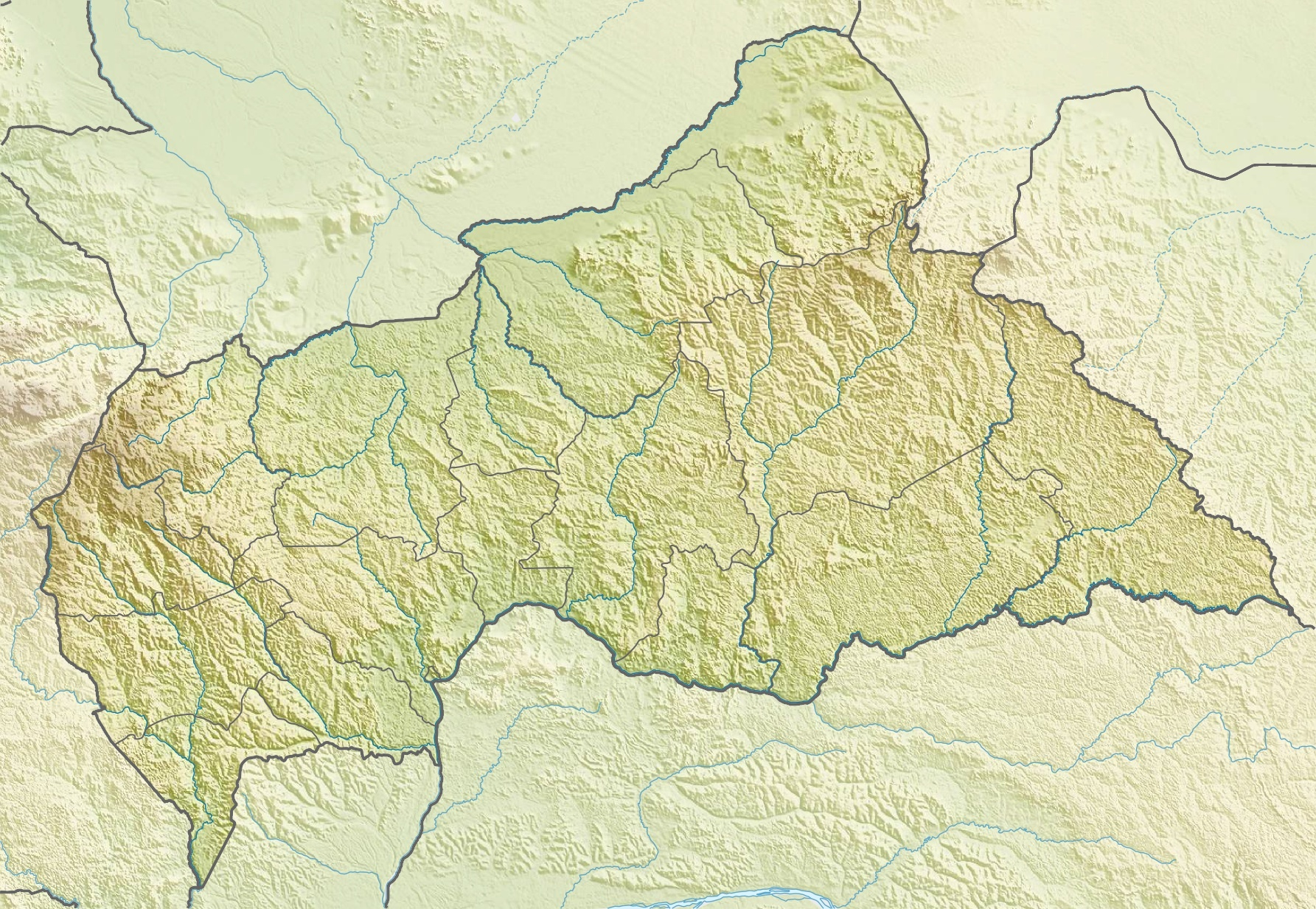
- Location in the Central African Republic
- Coordinates: 6°32′13″N 21°59′31″E
- Country: Central African Republic
- Prefecture: Haute-Kotto

Government
  - Sub-Prefect: Brahim Abdoulaye
  - Mayor: Maurice Balekouzou
- Elevation: 553 m (1,814 ft)

Population (2012)
  - Total: 43,322
  - Ethnicities: Goula Peuhl
- Time zone: UTC+01:00 (WAT)

Bria is the capital of Haute-Kotto, one of the 20 prefectures of the Central African Republic. As of the 2003 census the town had a population of 35,204.

== Geography ==
Bria is located on the Kotto River.

== History ==
In 1930, a ginning factory was established in Bria by the Comouna cotton company.

=== Civil war ===
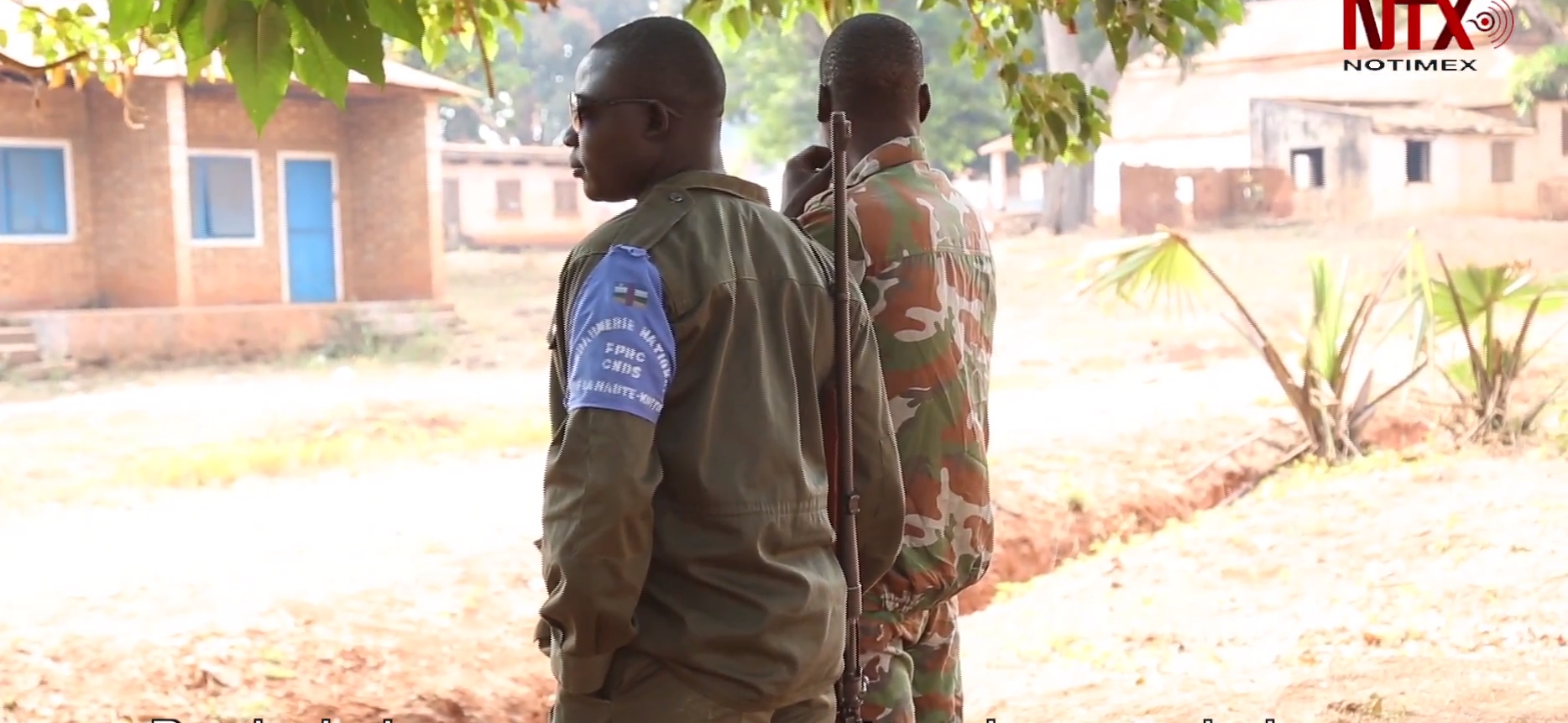
FPRC fighters in Bria in 2018

Map of situation in Bria in 2020

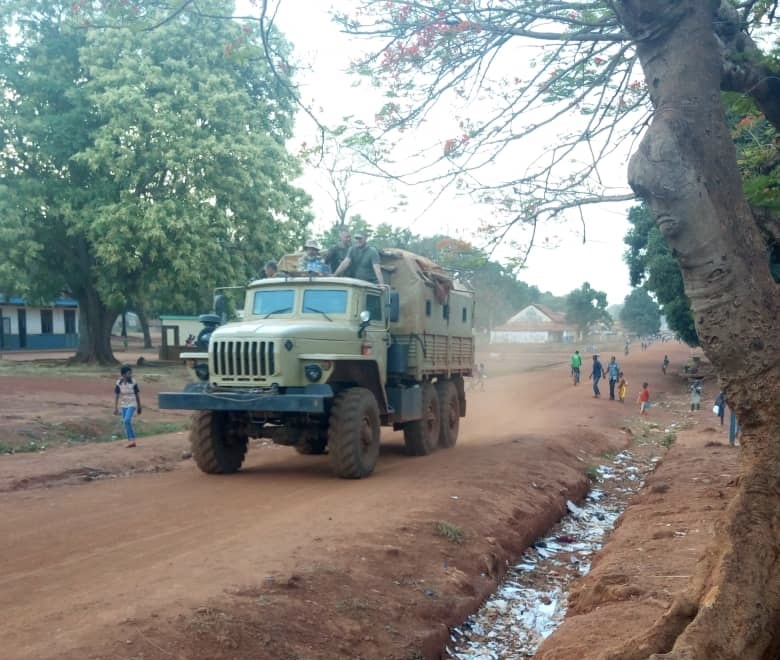
Vehicle with Russian and Syrian mercenaries from the Wagner Group passes through the town of Bria, April 2021

On 18 December 2012 Bria was captured by Séléka rebels. On 21 November 2016 an armed conflict broke out between the ethnicities Gula and Peuhl representing different armed groups resulting in death of 92 people, many more injured and 12000 refugees around the UN camp outside the city.

On 18 May 2017 heavy clashes erupted between Anti-balaka and ex-Seleka in Bria resulting in 26 deaths. On 21 June 2017 clashes between rival factions resulting in death of around 100 people. On 4 December 2017 Anti-balaka fighters led by Jean-Francis Diandi attacked international forces in Bria killing one Mauritanian peacekeeper. On 16 March 2018 Jean-Francis Diandi was arrested by peacekeepers. On 6 September 2018 Séléka rebels killed a number of people, most of them women.

On 25–6 January 2020 the MLCJ attacked Bria capturing more than 60% of the city after 24 hours of clashes with FPRC. On 28 January both groups signed ceasefire promising to withdraw fighters from parts of the town. On 22 March 2021 Bria was recaptured by government forces. One FPRC fighter was killed. On 2 April rebels launched attack on Bria which was repelled, two rebels and one soldier were killed.

Since 15 December 2021, Russian mercenaries from the Wagner Group have arrested numerous people – mainly youths – inside the town, leading to reported human rights abuses. On 4 January, the Wagner Group shot and killed 4 youths in a massacre. At 5:00 P.M. mercenaries entered the local mosque and removed the corpses of their victims from the building.

== Climate ==
Bria has a tropical savanna climate (Köppen climate classification Aw), with a lengthy though not intense wet season from mid-March to October and a relatively short and mostly rainless dry season from November to mid-March. Although the wet season is longer than the dry season, the dry season is sufficiently dry and the wet season insufficiently wet for tropical monsoon classification.

Climate data for Bria
Month	Jan	Feb	Mar	Apr	May	Jun	Jul	Aug	Sep	Oct	Nov	Dec	Year
Mean daily maximum °C (°F)	34.6 (94.3)	36.8 (98.2)	36.9 (98.4)	34.7 (94.5)	32.9 (91.2)	31.3 (88.3)	30.7 (87.3)	30.3 (86.5)	31.3 (88.3)	31.8 (89.2)	32.2 (90.0)	33.6 (92.5)	33.1 (91.6)
Daily mean °C (°F)	24.5 (76.1)	27.6 (81.7)	28.2 (82.8)	28.0 (82.4)	27.3 (81.1)	25.9 (78.6)	25.5 (77.9)	25.1 (77.2)	25.7 (78.3)	25.9 (78.6)	25.4 (77.7)	24.2 (75.6)	26.1 (79.0)
Mean daily minimum °C (°F)	14.5 (58.1)	17.9 (64.2)	19.7 (67.5)	21.5 (70.7)	21.0 (69.8)	20.5 (68.9)	20.2 (68.4)	20.2 (68.4)	20.1 (68.2)	19.9 (67.8)	18.1 (64.6)	15.3 (59.5)	19.1 (66.3)
Average rainfall mm (inches)	8 (0.3)	12 (0.5)	60 (2.4)	108 (4.3)	174 (6.9)	174 (6.9)	219 (8.6)	230 (9.1)	232 (9.1)	195 (7.7)	28 (1.1)	2 (0.1)	1,442 (57)
Source 1: Normales et records pour la période 2000-2012 à Bria ,
Source 2: Climate Bria - Central African Republic for rainfall totals ,

== Infrastructure ==
- Bria Airport

== See also ==
- List of cities in the Central African Republic
- Prefectures of the Central African Republic
