= Kouango =

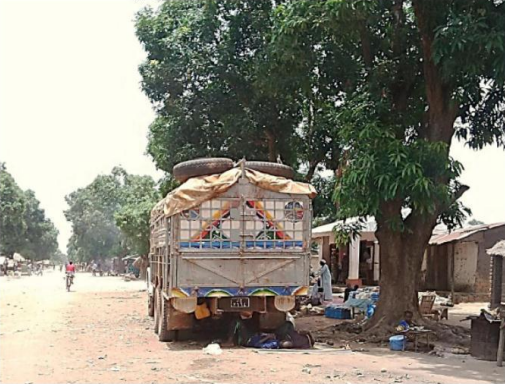
- Sudanese truck in Koaungo, 2015

- Location in Central African Republic
- Coordinates: 4°58′N 19°59′E
- Country: Central African Republic
- Prefecture: Ouaka
- Population (2003): 6,984

Government
  - Sub-Prefect: Lambert Afamika Boudou

Kouango is a town located in the Central African Republic prefecture of Ouaka.

== History ==
In February 2013 Kouango was captured by Séléka rebels. It was recaptured by government forces on 8 March 2021.

== Notable people ==
- Antoine Darlan (1915-1974), politician
- Simon Pierre Kibanda (1927-1999), diplomat
