= Séléka =

Central African Republic rebel alliance group

Séléka CPSK-CPJP-UFDR
- Leaders: Michel Djotodia; Joseph Zoundeiko (military wing)
- Dates active: September 2012–2014
- Groups: Democratic Front of the Central African People (FDPC); Convention of Patriots for Justice and Peace (CPJP); Union of Democratic Forces for Unity (UFDR); Patriotic Convention for Saving the Country (CPSK); Alliance for Revival and Rebuilding (A2R)
- Ideology: Opposition to François Bozizé; Pro-Djotodia
- Wars: Central African Republic Civil War

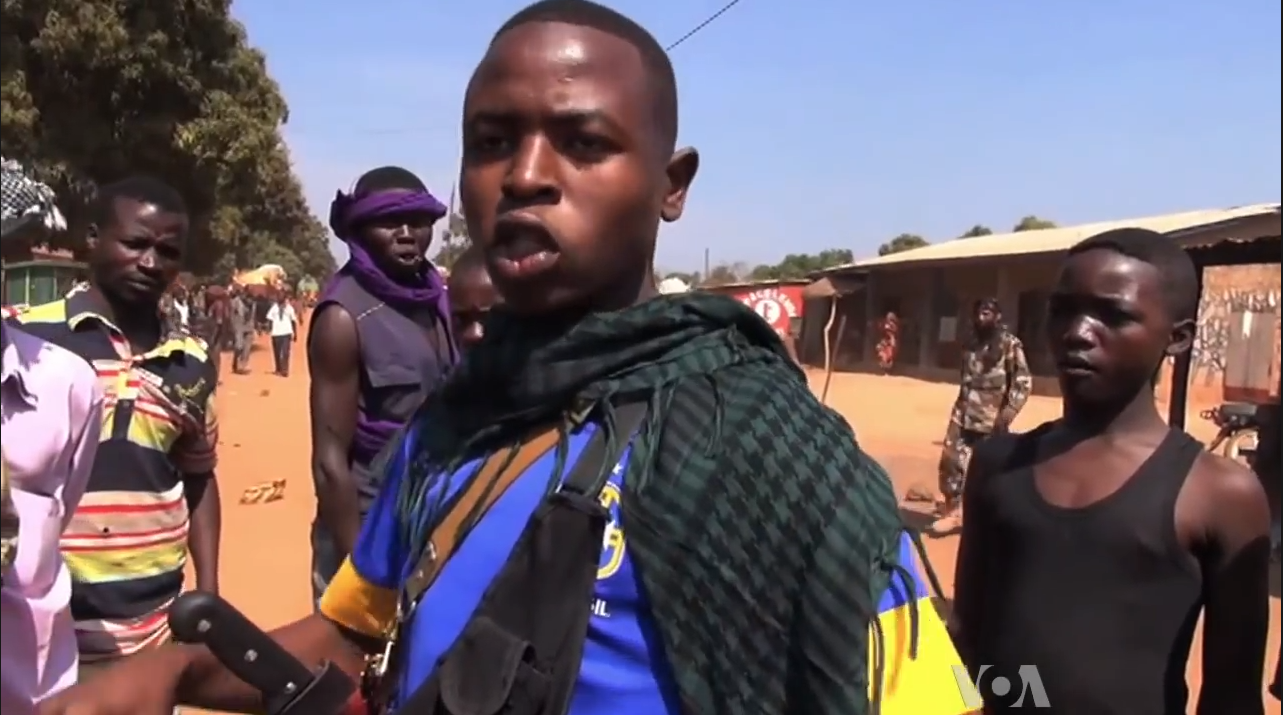
Séléka fighter in Kaga-Bandoro, 2014

Séléka CPSK-CPJP-UFDR was an alliance of rebel militia groups that subjugated the Central African Republic (CAR) on 24 March 2013. After its official dissolution in September 2013, the remaining rebel groups became known as Ex-Séléka. Séléka leader Michel Djotodia became the nation's president from March 2013 until his resignation in January 2014. Members of Séléka were almost all Muslim.

== Name ==
The word seleka means "coalition" or "alliance" in Sango, one of the CAR's two national languages, the other being French. The international media has shortened the full name Séléka CPSK-CPJP-UFDR (which incorporates the abbreviations for its component organisations) to la Séléka in French and Seleka in English.

The term Séléka had been used previously in CAR politics when Jean-Jacques Démafouth launched the political party New Alliance for Progress (French: Nouvelle Alliance pour le Progrès) with the Sango name Fini Seleka.

== Background ==
The rebel coalition originated in an agreement signed between factions of the Convention of Patriots for Justice and Peace (CPJP) and the Patriotic Convention for Saving the Country (CPSK), two of the CAR's many anti-government militias, on 20 August 2012. CPJP in this case refers to the "Fundamental" splinter group of the CPJP, one of many militias involved in the CAR's long-running civil war. A different faction of the CPJP signed a peace accord with the government on 25 August 2012.

The Séléka first emerged on 15 September 2012 under the name alliance CPSK-CPJP; when it published a press release taking responsibility for the attacks on three towns that day. It was the last of the major rebel groups to do so. The CPSK was hardly known. On 15 December 2012 the group published its first press release using the full name "Séléka CPSK-CPJP-UFDR" thus including the Union of Democratic Forces for Unity (UFDR). Two groups that did not appear in the title, the long-standing militia Democratic Front of the Central African People (FDPC), and the newly minted Alliance for Revival and Rebuilding (A2R), were also reportedly part of the alliance.

Members of the Séléka were usually Muslim, as was Michel Djotodia, the president the movement installed in March 2013 after taking power. However, it found its origin in social rather than strictly religious struggles. Muslims - who represent at most 15% of the country's population - have long been the victim of stigmatization and repressive policies, including great difficulty in obtaining legal documents, discrimination in the schooling system, and the systematic obligation to pay more than Christians at roadblocks. Later, the frequent massacres against Muslim communities committed by the Anti-balaka, as well as French military cooperation with the Anti-balaka, would further cement the Séléka's popularity among these communities as they were seen as a "bulwark" against repression.

On the international plan, Séléka reportedly enjoyed the support of Chadian president Idriss Déby, who had struck a deal with the group that Chadian agents would get hold of key posts in the Central African state apparatus after a takeover. Thus, according to certain observers, the 2013 coup occurred with Chadian backing, although Déby denied these allegations. The group was also partially made up of Sudanese Janjaweed fighters, who participated in summary executions and atrocities at some points in 2013.

== Civil War ==
In the months after the coup, which brought Séléka figurehead Djotodia to power, fighters connected to the militia plundered villages and killed Christians as well as supporters of former president François Bozizé. Throughout this period, Séléka operated as a "loose confederation of armed groups", largely beyond any effective control by commanders.

In September 2013, Michel Djotodia announced that Séléka had been dissolved; however, this had little effect on the rebel groups already roaming across the country. Militias from Séléka, now dispersed into the countryside, went on to commit mass atrocities according to observers including Human Rights Watch. Executions, rape and looting by Séléka fighters further escalated religious and ethnic tensions. Largely Christian militias, using the name Anti-balaka, were formed from pre-existing village militias around this same period. These groups engaged in combat with Séléka, but also indiscriminately massacred Muslims. In response, the United Nations considered sending troops to stop the atrocities, and established the MINUSCA peacekeeping mission in September 2014.

== Involvement in illegal trade ==
NGOs including Global Witness have criticized Séléka's connections to the illegal logging sector, in which the group was said to have a "particular interest" even prior to the 2013 coup. After Djotodia's takeover, his government struck lucrative deals with timber logging companies. The French Industrie forestière de Batalimo (IFB), Lebanese Société d’exploitation forestière centrafricaine (SEFCA) and Chinese Vicwood Group reportedly made illegal tax payments totalling €3,7 million to the Ministry of Finance, as well as monthly payments to Séléka fighters to safeguard their installations. SEFCA also paid an additional "advance" of €380,876 directly to Djotodia's government. According to a report from the UN Security Council, "illegal artisanal exploitation surged in non-attributed forest areas" under the Djotodia government, while logging trucks were "systematically subjected to illegal tax levying".

Aside from timber, the Central African economy is highly dependent on diamond and gold from its mining exploits. The sale of rough diamonds was temporarily suspended by the KPCS over fears of illicit trade by Séléka, Anti-balaka and other rebel groups. However, illegal trafficking of both diamond and gold (mainly to Cameroon, Chad and Sudan) continued, in which Séléka members were actively involved. Séléka further engaged in elephant poaching, organising illegal sales of ivory on international markets. According to the above-cited UN report, poaching and wildlife trafficking (also including antelope species) could be seen as "central elements of the Séléka rebellion". Involvement of Séléka in these forms of illegal trade was to continue after Djotodia's demise.

== Ex-Séléka militias ==
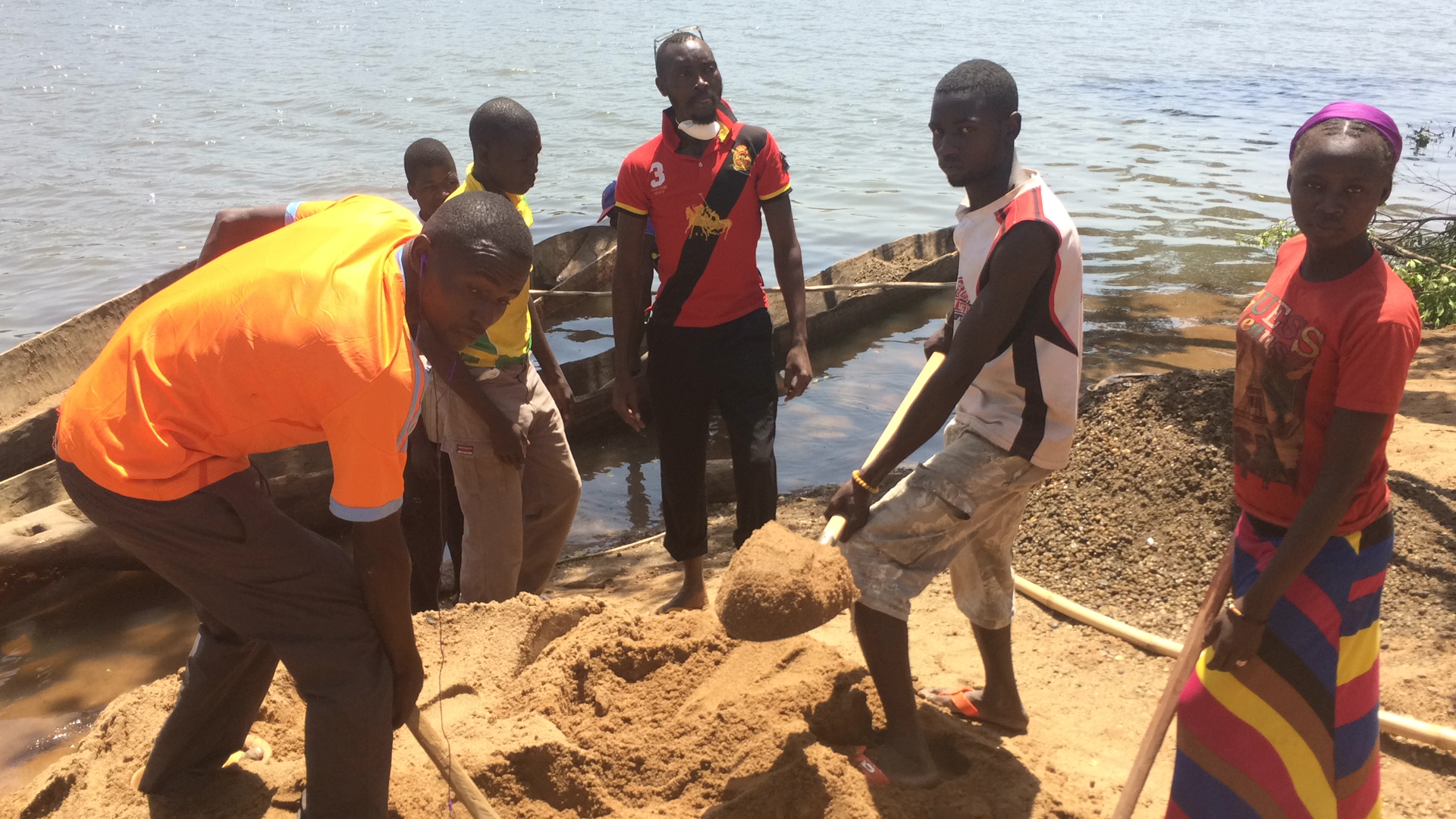
Former combatants of the Séléka engaged in a DDR process, February 2017.

By 2015, there was virtually no government control outside of the CAR capital, Bangui. Armed entrepreneurs have carved out personal fiefdoms in which they set up checkpoints, collect illegal taxes, and take in millions of dollars from the illicit coffee, mineral, and timber trades.

Months after the official dissolution of Séléka, it was not known who was in charge of ex-Séléka factions during talks with Antibalaka. On 12 July 2014, Michel Djotodia was reinstated as the head of a faction of Séléka, which renamed itself The Popular Front for the Rebirth of Central African Republic (FPRC), also translated as "The Popular Front for the Renaissance of Central African Republic". Later in 2014, Noureddine Adam led the FPRC and began demanding independence for the predominantly Muslim north, a move rejected by another general, Ali Darassa. He formed another Ex-Séléka faction called the Union for Peace in the Central African Republic (UPC) which is dominant in and around Bambari while the FPRC's capital is in Bria. Noureddine Adam declared the autonomous Republic of Logone on 14 December 2015; a spokesman for the Central African Republic's transitional government denounced the rebel's declaration. Another group is the Central African Patriotic Movement (MPC) founded by Mahamat Al Khatim. Much of the violence in this phase of the conflict is between Ex-Séléka militias and is often ethnic in nature with the FPRC targeting Fulani people who largely make up the UPC and the UPC targeting the Gula and Runga people, who largely make up FPRC, as being sympathetic to FPRC. Starting in November 2016, FPRC and MPC allied with their former enemy, the Anti-balaka, and attacked UPC. Most of the fighting is in the centrally located Ouaka prefecture, which has the country's second largest city Bambari, because of its strategic location between the Muslim and Christian regions of the country and its wealth. The fighting displaced 20,000 with the FPRC singling out Fulani people. In February 2017, Joseph Zoundeiko, the chief of staff of FPRC who previously led the military wing of Séléka, was killed by MINUSCA after crossing one of the red lines.

== Atrocities ==
On 18 September 2013, the Séléka killed scores of unarmed civilians, according to Human Rights Watch. The Séléka has also engaged in wanton destruction of numerous homes and villages. The 79-page report The Forgotten Human Rights Crisis in the Central African Republic details the deliberate killing of civilians – including women, children, and the elderly – between March and June 2013 and confirms the deliberate destruction of more than 1,000 homes, both in the capital, Bangui, and in the provinces. Many villagers have fled their homes and are living in the bush in fear of new attacks. Human Rights Watch documented the deaths of scores of people from injuries, hunger or sickness.

"Séléka leaders promised a new beginning for the people of the Central African Republic, but instead have carried out large-scale attacks on civilians, looting, and murder", said Daniel Bekele, Africa director at Human Rights Watch. "What's worse is that the Séléka have recruited children as young as 13 to carry out some of this carnage."

On 28 May 2014, the Séléka members threw grenades before shooting indiscriminately at the Church of Fatima in the capital Bangui, killing at least 11 people. In July 2014, the government of Uganda declared that it was at war with Séléka, accusing them of forcing civilians to give food and medicine to the Lord's Resistance Army and of trading ivory and minerals with them. Séléka denied the accusation.

Séléka leader Abdoulaye Hissène said in an interview that: "We have killed, murdered and violated, but what happened, happened".

On 9 November 2015, armed men cut the throats of 10 people in the village of Ndassima before carrying out an overnight attack nearby in Mala. Local administrator Yves Mbetigaza said "They came from two places, some from Bambari and others from Mbres." While a report on national radio described the attackers only as armed members of the Fula ethnic group (in French: Peul), Mbetigaza said they were Séléka fighters, adding that eight villagers were kidnapped in Mala and dozens of others were missing. On 12 November, six hunters were killed in the village of Bandambou.

On 3 December 2015, the Séléka armed men killed eight civilians at a camp for displaced people and wounded one U.N. peacekeeper, just days after the pope visited the capital. The attacks took place at Ngakobo, about 60 km (40 miles) south of the central town of Bambari.

Séléka often contends that mercenaries are to blame for the abuses. It is reported that official Séléka fighters are called for help to protect against mobs of ex-Séléka fighters.

In October 2021, Confirmation of charges hearings against ex-Séléka militiaman Mahamat Saïd opens before the International Criminal Court (ICC). This former militiaman is suspected of crimes against humanity and war crimes committed in 2013 and 2014. This is the first time that a former member of the Séléka has faced the judges of the Court.
