= Union for Peace in the Central African Republic =

Armed group in the Central African Republic

- Unité pour la paix en Centrafrique
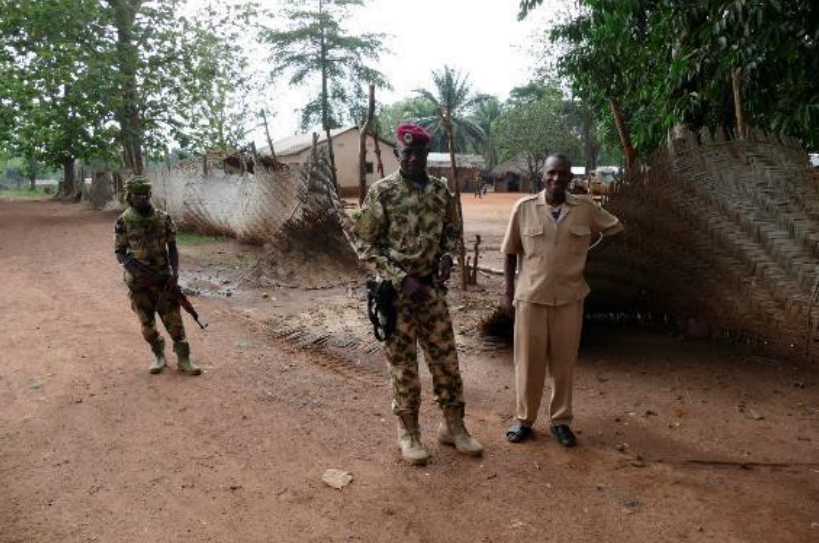
- UPC fighters in Alindao, 2019
- Leader: Ali Darassa
- Dates active: 17 September 2014 – 10 July 2025
- Split from: Séléka
- Headquarters: Bambari (2014–2017); Alindao (2017–2020); Bokolobo (2020–2021); Boyo (2021–2025)
- Active regions: Southern part of Central African Republic
- Part of: Coalition of Patriots for Change (2020–2025)
- Wars: Central African Republic Civil War (2012–present)

Territories under control of UPC

Union for Peace in the Central African Republic (French: Unité pour la paix en Centrafrique; UPC) was a rebel group in the Central African Republic which was present in southern parts of the country.

== History ==
UPC was formed on 17 September 2014 by Ali Darassa from the ex-Séléka elements. Their initial headquarters was Bambari, however they were forced to retreat on 6 March 2017. On 10 January 2019, they launched a heavy attack on MINUSCA forces in Bambari vowing to recapture the city. They were repelled and in response Portuguese paratroopers raided their base in Bokolobo, seizing some weapons and destroying some checkpoints. On 17 December 2020, the UPC joined the Coalition of Patriots for Change.

A peace agreement was concluded on 19 April 2025, between the Central African government and the armed groups 3R and UPC. They were officially dissolved on 10 July 2025, during a ceremony held in Bangui.

=== War crimes ===
On 29 January 2019, 18 people were killed and 23 wounded when UPC fighters opened fire during a funeral ceremony in Ippy. Between 2016 and 2020 UPC killed more than 1300 people. On 6 October 2021, 34 civilians were killed by alleged UPC rebels in the Matchika massacre.

== Organization ==
UPC used to profit from gold and diamond mines in areas it controlled including the Ndassima mine, whose control they share with the FPRC. They also profited from controlling cattle markets in Mobaye and Kouango.
