= MINUSCA =

UN peacekeeping mission in the Central African Republic

United Nations Multidimensional Integrated Stabilization Mission in the Central African Republic
- Formation: 10 April 2014
- Type: Peacekeeping mission
- Legal status: Active
- Head: Mankeur Ndiaye (Senegal), Special Representative
- Parent organization: United Nations Security Council
- Website: minusca.unmissions.org

The United Nations Multidimensional Integrated Stabilization Mission in the Central African Republic (also called MINUSCA, which is an initialism of its French name Mission multidimensionnelle intégrée des Nations unies pour la stabilisation en Centrafrique) is a UN peacekeeping mission, which started on April 10, 2014, to protect Central African Republic civilians under Chapter VII of the UN Charter. It transformed the 6,000-strong African Union-led peacekeeping force known as MISCA into a UN peacekeeping mission and became operational on September 15, 2014. The UN deployed a transition team to set up MINUSCA and prepare for a seamless transition of authority from MISCA to MINUSCA. As of 30 September 2021, it has more than 15,000 troops, police and civilian personnel on the ground. Its role is to:

- support the transition process;
- facilitate humanitarian assistance;
- promotion and protection of human rights;
- support for justice and the rule of law;
- disarmament;
- demobilization;
- reintegration;
- repatriation processes.

The current Special Representative of the Secretary-General and head of MINUSCA is Valentine Rugwabiza of Rwanda.

The top 3 countries contributing the most personnel are Rwanda, Bangladesh and Pakistan.

MINUSCA takes part in police and paramilitary actions in areas without clearly defined institutions of state.

== History ==
MINUSCA deployment in 2014

The Séléka militia staged a rebellion in 2013 that led to the end of François Bozizé's regime in the Central African Republic. The Séléka's continued heinous crimes in Central African Republic led to worsening conditions in Central African Republic, which then evolved the conflict from government resistance into a religious conflict. Information was later found that the Séléka was a Muslim group committing human rights violations against their predominantly Christian country. A Christian militia then formed, calling themselves the Anti-Balaka, to fight against the Séléka.

The Central African Republic began to weaken as the conflict continued, with an incline in mortality and a decline in life expectancy, which attributed to increasing rates of preventable and treatable diseases. The conflict also resulted in 320,000 people fleeing to neighboring countries, including Chad and Democratic Republic of Congo, and as of 2017, left approximately 600,000 people internally displaced.

In 2017, Vietnam made history by sending peacekeepers to join MINUSCA after the country participated in its first peacekeeping operation in South Sudan.

== Present ==
In 2015, a battalion from the Armed Forces of the Democratic Republic of the Congo (FARDC), numbering 807 personnel, was deployed to the CAR as part of MINUSCA. The DRC also deployed 118 police. In August 2015, allegations surfaced that three DRC soldiers had raped three young women in the town of Bambari, northeast of the capital Bangui. Allegations of child sexual exploitation and abuse were also made. In January 2016, it was announced that the battalion would be repatriated, as it had failed to meet UN "vetting and preparedness" requirements.

In 2017, Batatere, Damakongo and Hibou-2 operations were launched in Bambari, Bokaranga and Bang, and Bangui, respectively, in order to restore peace or drive out armed groups. Portuguese Commandos received a commendation letter during operation Batatere.

In recent attacks taken place in CAR in April 2018, MINUSCA and government forces initiated an operation that would disarm a militia, that was predominantly Muslim, in Bangui's peacekeeping 5 district, which is also where Christians were majority. MINUSCA is challenged to attain the mandate in protecting human rights and disarming and dismantling non-state actors due to the lack of infrastructure resistance in using military force.

In April 2019, Bangladesh Special Forces launched Operation Poupou, in order to recover government pickup trucks and restore freedom of movement in Zoukombo.

As the mandate for MINUSCA has been extended and amended on November 15, 2019, to fit the needs to support the Central African Armed Forces (FACA), there will be difficulty considering the lack of infrastructure and resources. The update to the mandate also includes for MINUSCA to assist the electoral process for a peaceful transition for president and legislative body by providing good offices, security, operational, logistical, and technical support for the election.

In the peacekeeping budget, MINUSCA receives 14% of the budget, with a total of $930,211,900 as of 2018–2019. MINUSCA is mostly unpopular in the Central African Republic due to a reputation of both police brutality and ineffectiveness.

On March 12, 2021, the United Nations Security Council voted to increase the size of the MINUSCA force, devoting an additional 2,750 troops and 940 police officers to the Mission.

In September 2021, the UN decided to withdraw some 450 Gabonese peacekeepers from its peacekeeping force in the Central African Republic after accusations of sexual exploitation and abuse which the Gabonese government has opened an investigation into. MINUSCA peacekeepers have been criticized for widespread rape and sexual violence against civilians.

On 15 May 2023 Humphrey Nyone was appointed force commander of MINUSCA by United Nations Secretary General, António Guterres. He succeeded Daniel Sidiki Traoré in this position.

Five UN police officers from the Republic of the Congo who were part of a MINUSCA convoy were killed on September 18, 2025, when their armored personnel carrier crashed and rolled into a river while crossing a bridge near Bangui, in the Central African Republic.

== Controversy and human rights violations ==
The operation is mostly unpopular in the Central African Republic due to a reputation of both police brutality and ineffectiveness.

MINUSCA has faced widespread criticism for incidents of rape and sexual violence committed by peacekeepers. Many women have refrained from filing complaints due to fear of reprisals or perceived indifference from MINUSCA. Reports of gang rapes and death threats by UN troops have been made by women who suffered abuse, with incidents continuing into 2022 and 2023. In response to allegations of sexual exploitation and abuse, the UN withdrew around 450 Gabonese peacekeepers in September 2021, prompting an investigation by the Gabonese government.

== Forces composition ==
Number of personnel by country as of 30 September 2022 (excludes civilian personnel)
Country	Number of personnel deployed
Rwanda	2,668
Bangladesh	1,417
Pakistan	1,314
Egypt	1,175
Cameroon	1,125
Zambia	930
Nepal	835
Mauritania	783
Morocco	778
Burundi	766
Senegal	701
Tanzania	457
Indonesia	421
Tunisia	387
Peru	235
Portugal	230
Cambodia	225
Congo	192
Sri Lanka	113
Serbia	78
Burkina Faso	64
Jordan	58
Côte d'Ivoire	54
Benin	45
Niger	39
Gambia	32
Togo	30
Bhutan	187
Mali	25
Guinea	19
Ghana	15
Kenya	15
Russia	14
Djibouti	13
Romania	12
Brazil	11
United States of America	10
Vietnam	9
France	8
Bolivia	7
Nigeria	7
Sierra Leone	7
Turkey	5
Gabon	4
Guatemala	4
Paraguay	4
Moldova	4
Czech Republic	3
Philippines	3
Spain	3
Uruguay	3
Zimbabwe	3
Argentina	2
Colombia	2
Ecuador	2
Kazakhstan	2
Mexico	2
Sweden	2
Total	14,563
