= Ouaka =

Prefecture of the Central African Republic

Coordinates: 6°00′N 21°00′E

- Prefecture
- Ouaka in the Central African Republic

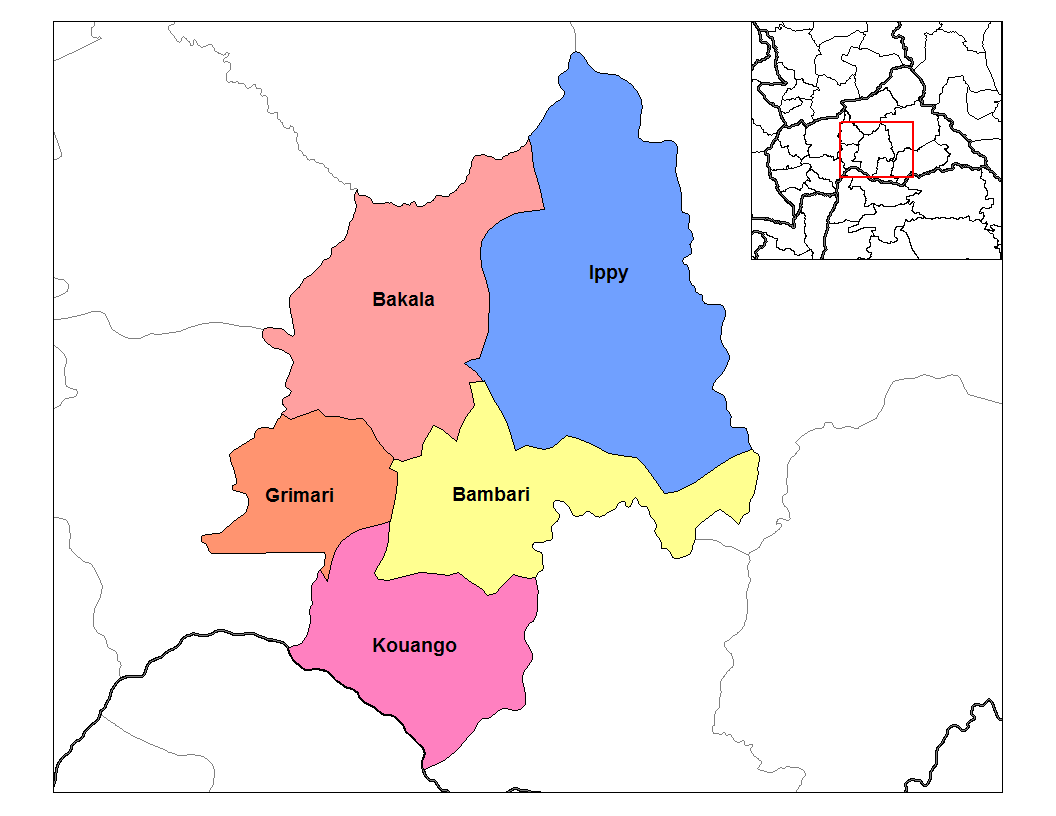
- Sub-prefectures of Ouaka
- Country: Central African Republic
- Capital: Bambari

Government
  - Prefect: Pascal Pamall

Area
  - Total: 49,900 km^{2} (19,300 sq mi)

Population (2003 census)
  - Total: 276,710
  - Estimate (2024 estimation): 459,412

Ouaka [wa.ka] is one of the 20 prefectures of the Central African Republic. It borders the Democratic Republic of the Congo, covers an area of 49,900 km^{2}, and has a population of 276,710 (2003 census). In 2024, official estimates suggest the population reached 459,412 inhabitants.

The prefecture is named after the Ouaka River and its capital is Bambari.

== Sub-prefectures ==
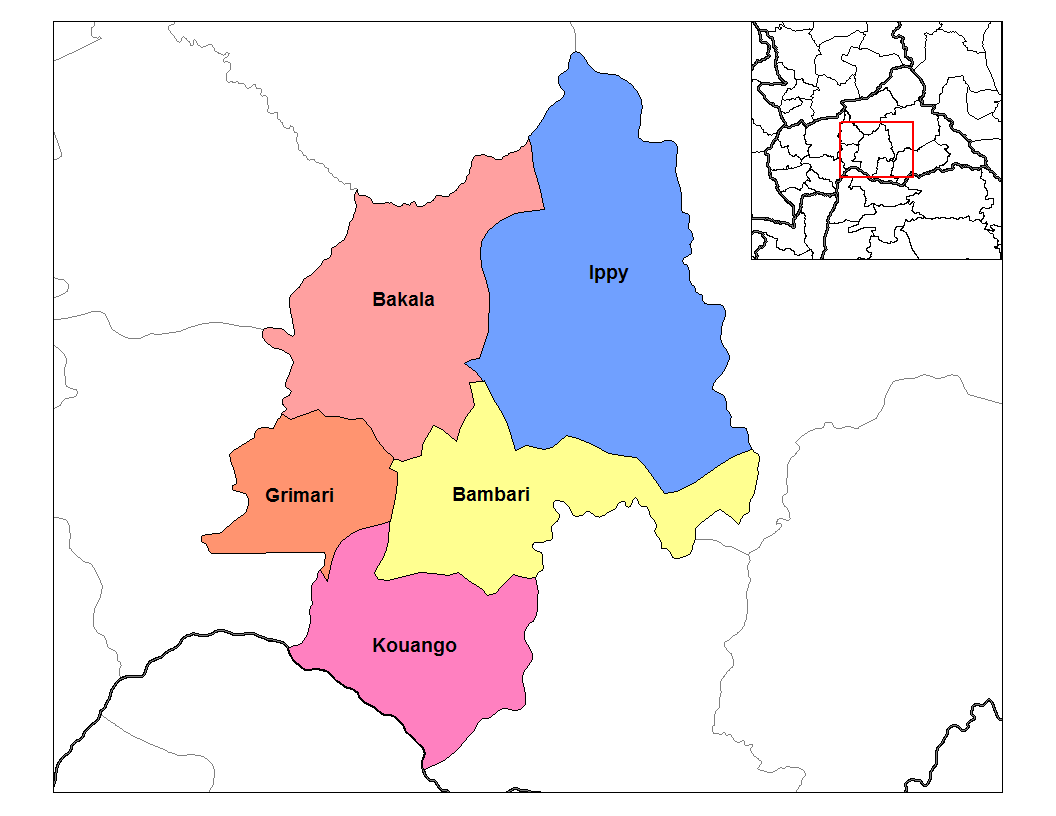
Sub-prefectures of Ouaka

- Bakala
- Bambari
- Grimari
- Ippy
- Kouango

== Towns and villages ==
- Adodo
- Afrotcho
- Agbandjo
- Aguéné
- Angbaka
- Angora
- Angoua
- Awatchie
- Azouyomba
- Babadja
- Bada
- Badjia
- Bagaya
- Bagou
- Bahamo
- Bakala
- Bakala Koupi
- Bakoro
- Balepou
- Baleyo
- Baligo
- Bambari (capital)
- Banga
- Banganendji
- Bangba
- Banguéré
- Banindji
- Baréamba
- Batibla
- Batobadja
- Beidou
- Belingo
- Bianga
- Bimbala
- Bindi
- Binguinendji
- Bisibanda
- Bologondjo
- Bohola
- Bothco
- Bouassi
- Bougwa
- Boulou
- Dakadjia
- Dalio
- Damangou
- Dambagoua
- Dami
- Dangé
- Digui
- Djama
- Djoubissi
- Dokoua
- Domanga
- Douloungoa
- Doumba
- Doungba
- Dourou
- Gambala
- Ganamandji
- Gaoda
- Gbadala
- Gibada
- Gibanda
- Gimodo
- Gotchélé
- Grapou
- Grengakola
- Grimari
- Goboudo
- Gouhoutou
- Goulinga
- Gousoumalé
- Guémé
- Igoua
- Ippy
- Kabadou
- Kedja
- Kerela
- Kidjigra
- Kodjo
- Kohiri
- Komali
- Komblé
- Kongbanga
- Kongolobadja
- Kopia
- Koropo
- Kotanguisa
- Kouango
- Koudoukou
- Koumbanga
- Koumourou
- Kouzouhindji
- Kradé
- Lekpa
- Lioto
- Makoulou
- Malikara
- Matchika
- Mbahouba
- Mbaranga
- Mbaya
- Méné
- Modokouzou
- Modomali-Mbrés
- Mono
- Morouba
- Ndioloussou
- Ndoro
- Ngadza
- Ngahondji
- Ngouyali
- Ouamba
- Oubou
- Pangakora
- Papa
- Pierlot
- Sakoua
- Samblé
- Séko
- Siou
- Tagbara
- Tawangé
- Tianbi
- Tougoumalé
- Tongouyassi
- Toumba
- Vevré
- Vilao
- Wali-Boykota
- Wandalongo
- Yabita
- Yamindou
- Yangao
- Yangoumaka
- Yangasa
- Yassibazanga
- Yéraoua
- Youbandji
- Zamahou
