= Bambari =

Town in Ouaka, Central African Republic

- Town
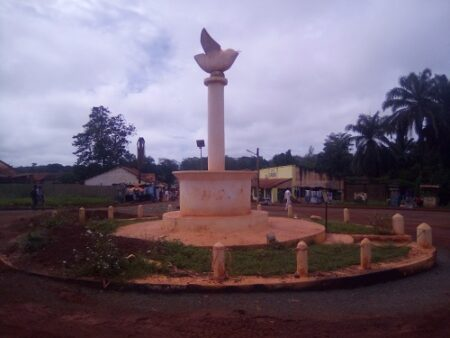
- View of Bambari

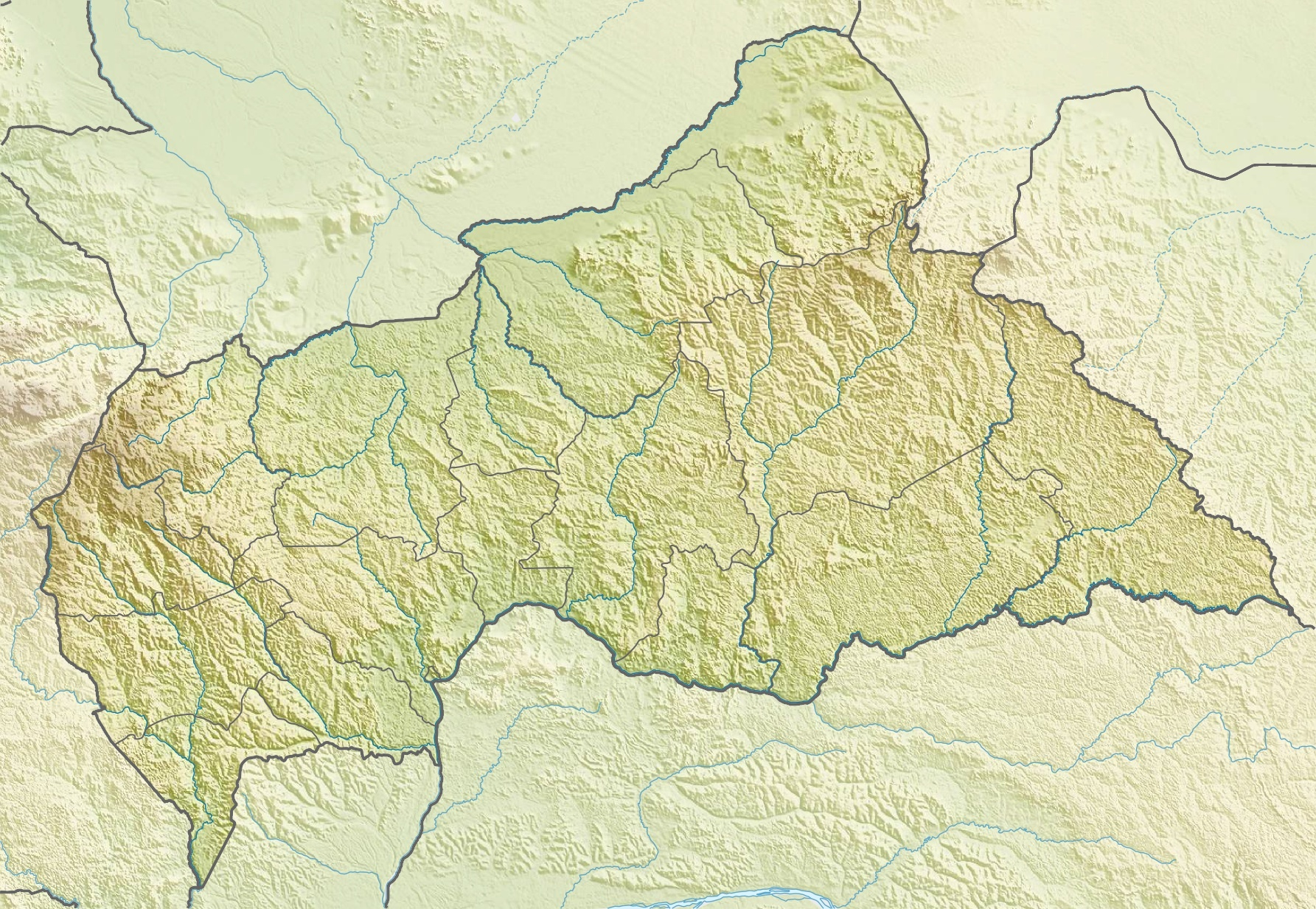
- Location in Central African Republic
- Coordinates: 05°45′55″N 20°40′27″E
- Country: Central African Republic
- Prefecture: Ouaka

Government
  - Sub-Prefect: Martin Kossi
  - Mayor: Abel Matchipata
- Elevation: 465 m (1,526 ft)

Population (2012)
  - Total: 41,486
- Time zone: UTC+01:00 (WAT)

Bambari is a town in the Central African Republic, lying on the Ouaka River. It has a population of 41,356 (2003 census) and is the capital of Ouaka prefecture. Bambari is an important market town and home to Bambari Airport, and the Roman Catholic Diocese of Bambari.

== History ==
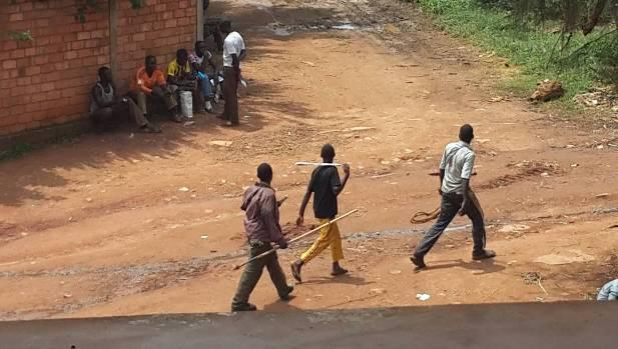
Anti-balaka fighters in Bambari, 2014

Bambari was electrified in 1970.

On 23 December 2012 Bambari was captured by rebels from Séléka coalition.

On 24 June 2014 100 Anti-balaka fighters attacked Bambari. 46 people were killed and 28 wounded. In 2015 it was reported that Bambari was split with Anti-balaka controlling the part west of Oukana river and ex-Seleka controlling the eastern part of the city.

On 22 February 2017 Ali Darassa and most rebels from Union for Peace in the Central African Republic withdrew from Bambari. Anti-balaka leader followed shortly after. On 10 January 2019 UPC rebels attacked Bambari. The attack was repelled after seven days of battle by government and international forces. More than 40 rebels were killed. On 8 December 2020 clashes erupted between FACA and UPC rebels in Bambari resulting in a few rebels being killed. On 22 December UPC took control of Bambari. They withdrew a day after, but later returned. Government forces finally fully recaptured Bambari on 18 February 2021.

== Climate ==
Köppen-Geiger climate classification system classifies its climate as tropical wet and dry (Aw).

Climate data for Bambari
Month	Jan	Feb	Mar	Apr	May	Jun	Jul	Aug	Sep	Oct	Nov	Dec	Year
Mean daily maximum °C (°F)	33.7 (92.7)	35.3 (95.5)	34.7 (94.5)	32.4 (90.3)	31.4 (88.5)	30.5 (86.9)	29.2 (84.6)	29.7 (85.5)	30.3 (86.5)	31. (88)	32.4 (90.3)	33.1 (91.6)	32.0 (89.6)
Daily mean °C (°F)	25.3 (77.5)	27.1 (80.8)	27.5 (81.5)	26.4 (79.5)	25.8 (78.4)	25.1 (77.2)	24.4 (75.9)	24.6 (76.3)	24.7 (76.5)	25.1 (77.2)	24.7 (76.5)	24.2 (75.6)	25.4 (77.7)
Mean daily minimum °C (°F)	16.9 (62.4)	19 (66)	20.4 (68.7)	20.5 (68.9)	20.2 (68.4)	19.7 (67.5)	19.7 (67.5)	19.5 (67.1)	19.2 (66.6)	19.2 (66.6)	17.1 (62.8)	15.3 (59.5)	18.9 (66.0)
Average precipitation mm (inches)	10 (0.4)	30 (1.2)	80 (3.1)	105 (4.1)	174 (6.9)	171 (6.7)	194 (7.6)	221 (8.7)	228 (9.0)	209 (8.2)	41 (1.6)	8 (0.3)	1,471 (57.8)
Source: Climate-Data.org, altitude: 442m

== Mining ==
Large deposits of iron ore have been discovered in the vicinity of Bambari, though the considerable distance to the sea—1500 km—probably makes exploitatation of these reserves doubtful in the near future. A heavy duty railway and a deepwater port in a neighbouring country would be required.

The mining resource also includes iron deposits at Bakala.

== See also ==
- List of cities in the Central African Republic
- Iron ore in Africa
