= List of warlords in the Central African Republic =

This is a list of military commanders who served in armed groups during the Central African Republic Civil War. They are listed by their most recent military allegiance. Symbols near their names indicate their fate:

- † – killed during fighting,
- – died for other reason while being active,
- (surrendered) – dropped his weapons and is no longer leading any fighters,
- – awaiting trial in jail.
- – jailed and subsequently acquitted or had charges dropped.
- – convicted and serving his sentence.
- – convicted, completed his sentence.

Those with names in bold are reportedly still active in armed groups as of 2022. Fate of others in the list is unknown.

== Anti-balaka ==
- **Bernard Bonda** – Bozizé's director of cabinet, member of Anti-balaka Mokom wing, in exile in Chad.
- **Igor Lamaka** – Anti-balaka general, became coordinator of Ngaïssona branch following his arrest in 2018. Fled to Chad in 2021 together with other leaders of Coalition of Patriots for Change. Suffered a stroke in March 2022 which left him partially disabled.
- Rodrigue Bozize, a leader of an anti-Balaka faction of the CPC. Died on 24 June 2024 due to illness.
- **Jean-Francis Bozizé** – son of former president Bozizé.
- Maxime Mokom – leader of Mokom branch. One of the signatories of the 2019 peace agreement. Arrested in 2021 by the International Criminal Court. In October 2023 charges against him were dropped and he was subsequently released from jail.
- Dieudonné Ndomaté – leader of Ngaïssona branch. One of the signatories of 2019 peace agreement. Arrested on 11 May 2021 in Bouca. Acquitted in 2022.
- Patrice Edouard Ngaissona – former leader of Anti-balaka. Arrested in December 2018 in France. On 24 July 2025, the ICC convicted Ngaïssona of war crimes and crimes against humanity targeting Muslims during the civil war and sentenced him to 12 years' imprisonment.
- Alfred Yekatom – arrested in November 2018. On 24 July 2025, the ICC convicted Yekatom of war crimes and crimes against humanity targeting Muslims during the civil war and sentenced him to 15 years' imprisonment.
- Eric Danboy Bagale – arrested in September 2020 in France.
- Rodrigue Ngaibona (alias Andjilo) – arrested in 2015, sentenced in 2018 to life imprisonment for war crimes in Bangui and on Bouca road.
- Sébastien Wenezoui (surrendered) – deputy general coordinator, in August 2014 he created a political party.
- Yanoue Aubin alias Chocolat † – Anti-balaka leader in Bangui. Arrested in July 2014 by French forces, sentenced in 2016 to two years in prison, completed by time spent in jail. Joined CPC in 2020. Murdered by Wagner Group in Sido in May 2021.
- Stève Yambété – former army lieutant, led Anti-balaka offensive on Beloko. Arrested on 17 January 2014 by Cameroonian authorities, he was released in 2019. On 10 August 2022 he was arrested in Bangui during which police found multiple guns. He was eventually released on 28 September.
- Dieudonné Oranti – one of the founders of Anti-balaka movement, in December 2013 ordered fighters to attack Bossangoa and Bangui.

=== Bangui ===
- Urbain Samy alias Bawa – former FACA soldier, Anti-balaka commander in 8th district of the capital Bangui, arrested in March 2016 by MINUSCA. Sentenced in December 2018 to 20 years in prison.
- Thierry Lébéné alias "Colonel 12 Puissances" – former member of Ngaïssona's wing of Anti-balaka, in 2020 he joined pro-government forces.
- Ludovic Namsio – commander in charge of east Bangui, controlled Oubangui river up to Kouango together with Thierry Lébéné.
- Guy Mazimbélet † – Anti-balaka commander killed on 26 September 2015 during clashes in Bangui.
- Jean-Jacques Larma alias Larmassou – in control of neighborhood south of Bangi airport in 2014. Arrested by colonel "12 puissances" and later released.
- Danzoumi Yalo alias "colonel Daz" – led small Anti-balaka group in Bangui, arrested on 14 December 2022 in Chad.
- Gabin Inga † – anti-balaka commander of the Combatants neighbourhood, killed in July 2014.
- "Zanguilo" – replaced Gabin Inga.
- Guy Gervais Mokpem – in charge of PK12 in Bangui in 2015.

=== Basse-Kotto ===
- Mathieu Gbotchando – Anti-balaka leader from Satema who in 2019 signed peace agreement. In March 2021 he looted building of ruling party in a village near Mobaye.
- Akim – Anti-balaka leader from Satema who in 2019 controlled the Mafunga Gia market, deputy of general Mathieu.
- Ludovic Angboyiondji – responsible for repeated human rights violations against civilians including illegal detention and torture at Boulangba market. Assistant of Mathieu, in April 2019 he killed a man in his 20s.
- Ndagou/Dago Isaac (surrendered) – Anti-balaka leader from Alindao. Alleged of leading group of fighters who shot at MINUSCA forces on 20 December 2017. Arrested on 7 January 2018 by MINUSCA and transferred to Bambari. Later he participated in 2018 Alindao massacre. In April 2021 he reportedly led 50 fighters in Satema. Surrendered to government forces on 21 December 2021.
- Denis Azoundanga – Anti-balaka general from Ngaba village near Mobaye, responsible for kidnapping of women.
- Barthelmy Ngandji – Anti-balaka general from Kembé. In June 2019 he took two women hostage keeping them in a church.
- Aime Ngbando – Anti-balaka general from Yangbassi, who ritually killed a 14-year-old girl to increase profit from mines.
- **Bienvenue Nguiambi** – Anti-balaka general commanding 10 men on Yeo island since 2019, in March 2019 he kidnapped 11 women. Responsible for kidnappings, theft, extorting illegal taxes from people passing Oubangui river. In July 2022 armed forces attacked his base, killing one fighter and arresting his father and brother, he managed to flee with a group of fighters. In August 2022 he met with prefect of Mobaye expressing his willingness to join disarmament and surrendered 40 AK rifles.
- Francis – Anti-balaka general controlling Yamboro island, who participated in kidnapping.
- Grace à Dieu Bedambe – Anti-balaka general from Kesse island, who participated in kidnapping.
- Luc Ngaima – Anti-balaka leader from Zangba who in August 2019 had beaten up local official. In March 2021 he reportedly was forcing people in the locality to vote for Ahamat Hussein.
- Jean-Pierre Bida – Anti-balaka leader from Satema, aligned with a local peace initiative.

=== Haute-Kotto ===
- Thierry Pelenga alias Bokassa (surrendered) – Anti-balaka leader in Haute-Kotto subprefecture. Surrendered in July 2021. Died in March 2024 because of illness.
- Jean-Francis Diandi alias Ramazani, Anti-balaka leader from Bria
- Theophile Ndoumba † – Anti-balaka leader from Bria, killed on 25 August 2018 ex-Séléka fighters.

=== Kémo ===
- Sioni Mènè (surrendered) – Anti-balaka general from Ndjoukou, in October 2022 he clashes with Anti-balaka faction led by Dimitri Ayoloma. On 3 May 2024 he surrendered to authorities in Koaungo together with 29 of his fighters.
- **Dimitri Ayoloma** - Anti-balaka leader in Grimari, responsible for killing of peacekeeper. In December 2020 he refused to join CPC and instead helped government forces. Later moved to Ndjoukou where he clashed with Anti-balaka militia led by Sioni Mènè. In July 2023 he was reportedly active between Damara and Kemo subprefecture. Arrested on 6 January 2025 for instigating death threat against all Grimari hospital health staffs.
- Dimanche Gervais Yambala – Anti-balaka leader in Kouma village on the Dekoa–Mala road from 2014 until at least 2015, responsible for murders and kidnapping.

=== Lobaye ===
- Habib Soussou – Anti-balaka leader in Boda since 11 April 2014 and in Lobaye since 28 June 2014. Subject to UN sanctions. On 1 June 2018, he was promoted by decree of the Minister of Defense as a master-corporal of armed forces.
- "Zaparo" † – former Anti-balaka leader from Batalimo village. On 20 April 2014 MISCA soldiers tortured him and killed him.
- General 8–8 – active in Boda in 2014, died under unknown circumstances.
- Aimé Dogo – deputy provincial coordinator in June 2014.
- Rodrigue Karamokonzi – zone commander in Boda in June 2014.
- Aimé Kotté – deputy zone commander in Boda in June 2014.

=== Mambéré-Kadéï ===
- Kevin Padom alias "Kempo" – in 2017 he led Anti-balaka in Berbérati.
- Edmond Beïna, Matruin Kombo – arrested in June 2024, accused of war crimes committed in 2014 in Gadzi.
- Chrysostome Berba Yapele(t) alias "Chiki Chiki" – led attack on Berbérati on 10 February 2014, after that became Anti-balaka zone commander in the town. Participated in Nairobi talks in December 2014, arrested in Berbérati on 21 June 2015, he escaped arrest and returned to the region. In August 2022 he testified as a witness via video link in a trial of Ngaissona at International Criminal Court.
- Nice Démowance/Demawanesse – commander of Gamboula in 2014. In 2017 he controlled mining sites around Amada-Gaza.
- Crépin Messamba alias "General Dalé" – a former member of the Presidential guard of François Bozizé, in 2017 he controlled mining sites at Sosso-Nakombo.
- Guy Wabilo – Anti-balaka zone commander of Gadzi. In April 2021 he reportedly was still engaged in exactions against civil population in Gadzi region.
- Rochael Mokom alias "Rocco" † – nephew of François Bozizé and brother of Maxime Mokom, led the offensive on Béloko in 2014. Killed on 11 May 2014 while driving a motorbike together with Camille Lepage.
- Leonard Bakongo – Anti-balaka zone commander in Guen in 2014.
- Gregoire Moussa – Anti-balaka zone commander in Sasele in 2014.

=== Mbomou ===
- Ferdinand and Herve Madambari † – two Anti-balaka leaders from Bakouma killed in 2018.
- Privat Sokomete – local Anti-balaka general from Bakouma who participated in looting the town in December 2020.
- Kevin Bere Bere, Romaric Mandago, Crépin Wakanam, Patrick Gbiako and Yembeline Mbenguia Alpha – sentenced in 2020 for their participation in May 2017 Bangassou clashes.
- Ahmat Raymond – attacked Bakouma on 20 March 2017.
- Yvon Didier Nzélété alias Kpokporo – former artisanal miner from Bangassou, organized 2017 attack on Bangassou. In 2020 joined Coalition of Patriots for Change. Tried to run in 2020 elections however his candidacy was invalited by the Constitutional Court. By 2024 he was arrested and is awaiting trial for war crimes.
- Mahamat Ngadé † – Anti-balaka general from Bangassou, killed in inter-group clashes in December 2017.
- "Pigeon vert" – took control of Bema crossing south if Bangassou following arrest of Pino Pino in May 2018.

=== Nana-Grébizi ===
- Max Narbé – Anti-balaka leader in Kaga Bandoro and Mbrès in 2015.
- Nguetemale Gauthier – Anti-balaka leader in Doukouma village in 2015. Signed a peace agreement in 2019.
- Franco Yagbegue alias Pelé – Anti-balaka leader in Blakadja village. He led several attack on Kaga-Bandoro–Mbres road in 2015.
- Colonel Pata – Anti-balaka leader in Maroka village in 2015.
- Kouazingo Gomez – in 2015 he controlled zone around Mboussa including the gold mine of Kagbi.
- Bertrand Gazamodo – Anti-balaka commander in Kaga-Bandoro in 2016. Signed a peace agreement in 2019.
- Leondie Yamake – Anti-balaka leader from Ndenga in 2017.
- Gustave Imguissa/Linguissa – Anti-balaka commander of Mbiti in 2017. Signed a peace agreement in 2019.
- Yves Toena – Anti-balaka commander of Doukouma in 2017.
- Alexis Maba – Anti-balaka commander of Ouandago in 2019.

=== Nana-Mambéré ===
- Marcel Ndalé † – leader of Anti-balaka in Bouar, together with his two brother **Ibrahim** and Adouma. His group was part the Coalition of Patriots for Change. He and Adouma were killed in a joint FACA—Russia operation in November 2026.
- Bellon Michel and his son Emma Michel (surrendered) – based in Bata village on Bouar-Bozoum axis, responsible for multiple robberies in the region in 2023. They surrendered in mid-July 2024.
- Aaron Wilibona alias "Coxis" – controlled Cantonnier-Bouar axis in April 2014. On 7 July 2015 he escaped from Ngaragba prison in Bangui and on 5 September arrived in Berbérati. Arrested in October 2020 in Cameroon.
- Elvis Fanyama – deputy of general Gbakaba in Beloko, arrested in August 2016 in Bangui.
- "Américain" † – Anti-balaka general from Beloko, executed by MISCA during road stop on 12 July 2014.
- Arnold Geoffroy Iya – coordinator in Bouar in 2015.

=== Ombella-M'Poko ===
- Yvon Konaté – arrested on 15 December 2020 near Bossembélé while travelling to Bossangoa, suspected of trying to join CPC rebels. Acquitted on 15 June 2022.
- Severin Ndoguia alias "Le Bleu" – Anti-balaka general from Yaloke who following 2020 conflict joined government side. In 2022 his fighters committed attacks on Fulani community. He died on 29 December 2022 for natural reasons.
- General Witte – in 2017 he controlled mining sites around Pama area.
- Sylvestre Yagoussou – commander of Damara in 2014.
- Séraphin Keansem – commander of Boali in 2014.
- Sylvain Beorofie/Béorofei – commander of Bossembélé in 2014. One of signatories of creation of Coalition of Patriots for Change on behalf of Ngaïssona branch.
- Cyriaque Bondo (surrendered) – formerly commander of Anti-balaka in Boda, he eventually dropped weapons and become a gardener.
- Jourdain Sélébondo – formerly commander of Anti-balaka from Boali, arrested in 2016. On 28 August 2018 sentenced to life imprisonment for criminal association, murder, illegal possession of arms and munitions of war and armed robbery.
- Séverin Richard – Anti-balaka zone commander in Yaloke in 2014.
- Hubert Sélébondo – kidnapped MINUSCA officers in October 2015.

=== Ouaka ===
- Ndoli Sipriya – surrendered in June 2024 in Kouango with 115 fighters.
- Fally † – Anti-balaka commander from Kouango. In April 2016 he attacked village Ganemandji looting the office of a national NGO. He was killed by Anti-balaka general Gaëtan on 19 April 2016.
- Gaëtan Bouadé † – Anti-balaka general from Bambari, in August 2016 joined disarmament process. On 10 December 2017 he was killed during clashes in Ndassima.
- Michel Mandakara † – since October 2014 he conducted several attacks against civilians near Kouango killing dozens of people. He was killed in September 2019 in a firefight with UPC.
- Mandayé † – killed by armed forces on 2 August 2020 during an attack on Grimari.
- Marcelin Madekanga – zone commander of Bambari, arrested on 11 September 2018 by national gendarmerie, accused of robbing civilians in the Kidjigra neighbourhood.
- “Douze couteaux” – Anti-balaka commander from Bangui active in Bambari in 2014.
- "Riskeur" – Anti-balaka commander from Bangui active in Bambari in 2014.

=== Ouham ===
- José Befio † – leader of pro-CPC Anti-balaka in Ouham as of March 2023, engaged in cattle theft, in January 2023 clashed with armed forced near Bouca. On 22 July 2024 he was killed in Bouca by army and Russian mercenaries.
- **Jeudi-Jeudi** – CPC Anti-balaka zone commander in Ouham in October 2023.
- Dieudonné Ngaibona alias Dié – brother of general Andjilo. Sentenced to life imprisonment on 27 November 2018 for 2015 kidnapping.
- Fulbert Bondo – sentenced to life imprisonment on 27 November 2018 for 2015 kidnapping.
- René Linga – Anti-balaka general from Batangafo who was active in 2017.
- Eugene Barret Ngaikosset alias Butcher of Paoua – Anti-balaka commander from 2015 in Ouham area, arrested in 2021 for war crimes.
- Florent Daniel Kema – Anti-balaka commander in Ouham in 2015. Run in 2021 elections in Nana-Bakassa, however his victory was invalidated by the Constitutional Court.
- Romain Finidiri (surrendered) – Anti-balaka commander in Benzambe in 2015. In November 2018 he participated in a meeting in Batangafo with FPRC regarding ceasefire. In 2019 he became a stonemason thanks to UN-sponsored program to integrate former combattants.
- Joseph Kéma – commander of Bossangoa in 2015.
- Charlin-Chabardo Momokama alias Charli – Anti-balaka zone commander of Bossangoa since 2016. In February 2020 he kidnapped a Muslim child and tortured his parents.
- Hyppolite Gnikama - Anti-Balaka leader in Bouca.
- "Colonel Simplice" – Anti-balaka zone commander in Batangafo in 2014.

=== Ouham-Pendé ===
- Richard Béjouane † – former Anti-balaka leader from Bozoum. On 9 May 2014 after he started firing into air MISCA tried to arrest him. When he refused they killed him and his son.
- Zari Bienvenu alias Abba Rafael † – former Anti-balaka leader from Bozoum. On 25 April 2017 he kidnapped and raped 10 girls in Bocaranga. Killed on 29 April 2017 by one his fighters near Bang village.
- Basile Dika – coordinator in Ouham-Pende in 2015.

=== Sangha-Mbaéré ===
- Ferdinand Ndobadi (surrendered) – former commander of Nola, laid down his weapons.

== Azande Ani Kpi Gbe ==
- Célestin Bakayogo-Leman alias "General Limane" – current leader of Azande Ani Kpi Gbe. Arrested on 27 March 2025 in Zemio-Mboki axis.
- Elias Gomengue alias "Elie Pasteur" –Azande Ani Kpi Gbe senior commanders. Arrested on 24 January 2025.
- Marcelin Kangoyessi alias "Maxon" – Deputy of General Limane. Arrested on 24 January 2025.
- Elie Dimanche – General Limane's deputy. Arrested on 24 January 2025.
- Michel Koumboyeki – Azande Ani Kpi Gbe senior commanders.
- Cedric Parfait Agbia alias "Baloko" or "Boloko" – Azande Ani Kpi Gbe senior commanders. On 8 March 2024, he was responsible for blocking the MINUSCA convoy 12 km west of Obo.

== Black Russians ==
=== Former Anti-balaka ===
- **Réal/Royal** – controlled mining sites around Bakala in 2018, reportedly active as a pro-government Anti-balaka general between Bakala and Lougba in July 2023.
- **Akra** – pro-government Anti-balaka general, reportedly active near Tongo-Bakara in July 2023.
- **Dix-Roues** – pro-government Anti-balaka general, reportedly active near Boyo in July 2023.
- **Marcelin Orog(b)o** – former associate of Gaëtan Bouadé, left Bambari on 24 February 2017. Reportedly active near Bambari in July 2023 as pro–government Anti-balaka general.
- **Jean Ligodi** – Anti-balaka leader in a village 20 km from Ippy, reported to be stealing cattle from Fulanis in Baïdou-Ngoubrou in January 2023,
- Gonede Jospin alias "Jojo" – active near Bambari in July 2023. Arrested in September 2023, charged with war crimes and crimes against humanity in relation to 2021 Boyo killings.
- Edmond Obrou Patrick – On 21 March 2018 led an attack on UPC base in Tagabara. In 2019 Anti-balaka commander of Mambissu village, signed peace agreement with UPC. Recruited by Russian mercenaries in 2021, participated in 2021 Boyo killings. On 8 March 2022 he was arrested by another Anti-balaka general who handed him over to gendarmerie. On 11 April he was released without judicial authorization. Arrested on 16 September 2023, war crimes and crimes against humanity.
- Nzapawouyome Bernard alias "Sossengué" – Anti-balaka general from Atongo-Bakari. In March 2017 he supported attack on Bakouma. He participated in 2021 Boyo killings. In July 2023 reportedly active near Tagbara. Arrested in September 2023, charged with war crimes and crimes against humanity.
- Ange † – formerly member of Anti-balaka in Bouar under command of Marcel Ndalé, in 2020 he joined Black Russians, committing multiple acts of extorsion against civilians in the area. Killed by unknown armed men on 7 August 2023.

=== Former UPC ===
- **Hassan Bouba** – minister of livestock and animal health in the Central African Republic and leader of splinter faction of the Union for Peace in the Central African Republic armed group.
- **Kiri** – member of Bouba's faction, allegedly participated in 2021 Matchika massacre. Still active as of July 2023.
- **Salambaye** – active as of July 2023.
- **Sanda** – active as of July 2023.
- **Yarus Mekonen**
- **Hassan Guéndérou** – UPC commander from Haut-Mbomou. Participated in attack on Bakouma in December 2020. Joined Bouba faction in 2021. On 24 December 2022 he was arrested by gendarmerie, but was released shortly after.
- **Idriss Maloum**
- **Hamadou Tanga**
- **Ran-Rani Naftali**
- Moussa Issa – in October 2020 joined Bouba's faction.

== Central African Patriotic Movement (MPC) ==
- **Mahamat al-Khatim** – leader of the movement, currently on exile in Chad. He was arrested on 10 April 2024 by Agence nationale de sécurité.
- Ahmat Bahar – briefly led National Movement for the Liberation of the Central African Republic before rejoining MPC.
- Abdoulaye Ahamat Faya – former UPC general, after leaving the movement evacuated with group of dissidents to Kaga-Bandoro by MINUSCA. Joined MPC, was later based in Bria.
- Oumar Fadlala – former UPC general, joined group of dissidents led by Faya. Joined MPC, was later based in Bria.
- Hassan Adramane (surrendered) – leader of splinter faction of MPC, on 28 April 2023 announced dissolution of his group.
- Alkali-Saïd Abdoulaye – former general of MPC, sentenced to six years in prison in September 2019.
- Idriss Ahmed El Bashir/Bahar – former MPC executive officer, captured in February 2017 while advancing on Bambari. Sentenced to five years in prison in August 2018.
- Abdulaye Oumar – MPC zone commander in Mbres in 2015.
- Adjaj † – MPC general killed in October 2023 in Kouki.

== Coalition of Patriots for Change (CPC) ==
Note: Commanders of individual groups forming CPC are listed in their respective groups

- **François Bozizé** – former president of the Central African Republic, leader of CPC, currently in exile in Chad.
- Abakar Sabon (surrendered) – former leader of Movement of Central African Liberators for Justice, minister in Djotodia government, spokesman of Coalition of Patriots for Change until January 2022. ANS arrested Sabon on 10 April 2024.

== Democratic Front of the Central African People (FDPC) ==
In July 2019 FDPC fighter have fully disarmed. Group is no longer active

- Abdoulaye Miskine – arrested in October 2019 in Chad.
- Justin Hassane - FDPC leader in 2006
- Marcel Bagaza (surrendered) – former member of FDPC, nominated prefect of Nana-Mambéré prefecture in 2019.

== Lord's Resistance Army (LRA) ==
- **Joseph Kony** – leader of the group.
- Doctor Achaye (surrendered) – operated on the border between C.A.R. and D.R.C. In 2023 he surrendered and returned to Uganda.
- Owila (surrendered) – operated on the border between C.A.R. and D.R.C. On 28 September 2023 he was flown back to Uganda after agreeing to disarm.
- Dominic Ongwen – captured in 2014 in the Central African Republic, sentenced to 25 years in prison for war crimes.
- Charles Okollo – captured by Uganda in 2014 near Nzacko.

== Misseria Arabs ==
- **Mohamed Adam** alias Abou-Kass/Aboulkasi – led around 50 men operating multiple checkpoints north of Birao, led kidnapping of a man in October 2022.

== Movement of Central African Liberators for Justice (MLCJ) ==
On 4 December 2022 official dissolution of the group was signed in Bangui

- Toumou Deya Gilbert (surrendered) – MLCJ leader, also a government minister.
- Achafi Daoud Assabour – former UPC general, joined group of dissidents led by general Faya. In 2017 he joined MLCJ.
- Achille Modjekossa Gode – nominated sub-prefect of Ouadda in 2019.
- Yacoub Tom Ngarafa - self-proclaimed colonel, arrested on 16 January 2020 by FPRC in Takadja.
- Ali Abderahmane - MLCJ Chief of Staff.

== Movement for Democracy and the Central African Republic (MDPC) ==
- Arda Hakouma - leader of MDPC. Arrested in 2025 in Tissi, Chad for establishing contact with the UFR.

== Party of the Rally of the Central African Nation (PRNC) ==
- **Abdelrahman Tourkach** – PRNC military ccordinator.
- Nourd Gregaza – president of PRNC. Arrested in 2019 in France for murder. On 20 September 2024 he was transferred to the Central African Republic where he was promptly arrested.
- Ahmat Dibanne - PRNC's Chief of Staff since February 2024 replacing Mohamed Ali. In April 2024 he laid down his arms. In October 2024 he was arrested in Bangui.
- Issa Issaka Aubin † – first chief of staff of PRNC, killed on 27 March 2020 in clashes with Misseriya Arabs.
- Mohamed Ali alias B13 † – participated in 2022 attack on Ouandja-Djale. Nominated as a chief of staff of PRNC. In February 2024 PRNC confirmed his death following an attack on village in Vakaga.
- Mahamat Nil – Chadian national, participated in Vakaga kindappings. Reportedly captured during fighting in June 2023 in Bria and sent to Bangui.
- Tom Adam alias Bin Laden † – RPRC general in charge of Sam Ouandja in 2021. Allied in 2022 with Noureddine Adam, nominated as CPC commander of Bamingui-Bangoran region. Killed by Rwandan contingent of MINUSCA on 10 July 2023.

== Patriotic Rally for the Renewal of the Central African Republic (RPRC) ==
On 4 December 2022 official dissolution of the group was signed in Bangui

- Damane Zakaria † – he was killed on 12 February 2022 by Russian mercenaries from Wagner Group in Ouadda together with 20 of his men.
- Herbert Gontran Djono Ahaba (surrendered) – minister of transport, RPRC leader.
- Azor Kalité – participated in 2020 N'Délé clashes. Arrested on 19 May 2020 by MINUSCA for war crimes. Sentenced in December 2024 to 20 years in prison.
- Antar Hamat – participated in 2020 N'Délé clashes. Arrested on 25 May 2020 by MINUSCA. Sentenced in December 2024 to 15 years in prison.
- Charfadine Moussa – participated in 2020 N'Délé clashes. Sentenced in December 2024 to 15 years in prison.
- **Beladaine Tom** – participated in 2020 N'Délé clashes and 2022 attack on Ouandja-Djale.
- **Mahamat Deya** – former bodyguard of Damane Zakaria, participated in 2022 attack on Ouandja-Djale.
- Soumaine Ndodeba alias "Tarzan" – former Seleka general and UFDR fighter. Later joined RPRC, left Bambari on 24 February 2017.

== PK5 self-defense group ==
- Niméri Matar alias Force – died on 1 June 2019 from sickness.
- Mahamat Rahamat alias LT – leader since 2019.
- Mohamed Tahir alias Apo † – died in 2018.
- Issa Kappy alias 50/50 † – killed on 30 October 2016 during fighting.
- Abdoul Danda † – killed on 30 October 2016 during fighting.
- Djido
- Youssouf Ayatoulah Adjaraye alias You – arrested on 12 December 2017 for assault and murder sentenced to life imprisonment on 17 December 2018.

== Popular Front for Recovery (FPR) ==
- Baba Laddé – arrested in 2012, sentenced to 8 years in prison. Completed sentence in 2020, in 2021 appointed director of general intelligence for Chad. Arrested again on 26 December 2022, he was released on 17 February 2023. In August 2023 he reportedly arrived in the Central African Republic where he planned attacks against Chad together with Hassan Bouba and Touadera.

== Popular Front for the Rebirth of Central African Republic (FPRC) ==
- **Noureddine Adam** – leader of FPRC, joined Coalition of Patriots for Change in December 2020.
- **Mahamat Saleh** – participated in attack on Bakouma in December 2020.
- **Aba Tom** – in November 2022 based around Am Dafock. Injured in February 2023 during attack on Ndah.
- **Haroun Gaye** – former PK5 fighter, joined Coalition of Patriots for Change in December 2020. Fled to Sudan in 2021, in July 2022 he crossed Sudanese border into Chad and was questioned by security forces in the Mangueigne sub-prefecture. He then crossed the border to join CPC forces in the Central African Republic where he was seen addressing FACA hostages in Sikikédé on 15 February 2023.
- **Ousta Ali** – surrendered in Bria on 27 July 2021. However, in May 2023 he was again reported to be active in CPC.
- Abdoulaye Hissène – FPRC general, refused to join Coalition of Patriots for Change. On 28 April 2023 he announced dissolution of his faction of the group. On 5 September 2023 he was arrested in Bangui.
- Joseph Zoundeiko † – killed on 12 February 2017 while advancing on Bambari.
- Moctar Adam † – responsible for massacre of 17 civilians in Ippy in December 2017. Gunned down by Russian mercenaries on 8 May 2022 in N'délé together with his two brothers while trying to evade arrest.
- Mama Amibe † – killed by Russians on 13 March 2022 in Tirigoulou village.
- Damboucha Hissein – participated in 2018 attack on Bakouma. Participated in attack on Bakouma in December 2020. In June 2021 present in Aïgbado near Bria. Arrested in March 2023 by MINUSCA.
- **Faris Youssouf Ben Barka** – participated in 2018 attack on Bakouma. In January 2023 he enacted barriers near Manou village to collect taxes.
- Saléh Zabadi – FPRC military commander, who was one of signatories of creation of Coalition of Patriots for Change, however he did not order his fighter to join CPC forces. Arrested in January 2022 in Chad.
- Kousko Abdel Kani – brother of arrested Seleka general Abdel Kader Kallil, arrested on 10 November 2021 in Bria by Russian mercenaries.
- Ahmat Tidjani – former right hand of Noureddina Adam, he was part of the group who together with Gaye and Hissene tried to escape Bangui in August 2016. Arrested by MINUSCA, he was sentenced to life imprisonment on 1 March 2018.
- Yaya Scout † – FPRC general from Huate-Kotto, reportedly killed by MINUSCA in November 2016 during clashes in Bria.
- Mocko Abdel Ouya - FPRC commander in Am Dafok
- Adam Kanton † – killed by MLCJ fighter in Birao on 2 September 2019.
- **Djuma Alanta** - FPRC general and former deputy of Damame Zakaria. In 2023, based in Mbangana.
- Oumar Younous † - FPRC general. Killed on 10 or 11 October 2015 by international forces in Sibut.
- Bashar Fadoul - FPRC General. Arrested in late March 2019 by the Sudanese military intelligence and was released on 8 April.
- Line Algoni Anesser – former FPRC deputy commander, captured in February 2017 while advancing on Bambari. In 2022 sentenced to 20 years in prison.
- Yaya Idriss – former FPRC political counsellor, captured in February 2017 while advancing on Bambari. Sentenced to five years in prison in August 2018.
- Moussa Maouloud – self-proclaimed Séléka zone commander in Batangafo in 2014, later became FPRC Deputy Coordinator. He was nominated minister of small and medium-sized businesses.
- Adoum Kamis – FPRC commander in Bema in 2015.

== Return, Reclamation, Rehabilitation (3R) ==
- Bi Sidi Souleymane alias Sidki Abbas † – former leader of the group, killed during fighting in Bossembele.
- **Sembé Bobbo** – current leader of the group, brother of warlord Babba Ladde.
- Issa Salleh, Mahamat Tahir and Yauba Ousman – responsible for 2019 Ouham-Pendé killings, sentenced in 2022.
- Kaou Laddé † – former chief of staff, killed on 25 March 2022 in fight with Russian mercenaries.
- **Doborodjé Goska** – chief of staff of 3R since 23 September 2022.

== Revolution and Justice (RJ) ==
In July 2019 Revolution and Justice fighter have fully disarmed. Group is no longer active

- Armel Mingatoloum-Sayo – former leader of Revolution and Justice. Cameroon arrested Sayo in Douala International Airport on 17 January 2025 when he wanted to board a flight to France.
- Esther Audrienne Guetel-Moïba (surrendered) – former leader of Bélanga faction of Revolution and Justice.
- Raymond Bélanga † – former leader of Bélanga faction of RJ, shot dead by MNLC fighter on 28 November 2017.
- François Toussaint – Belgian mercenary, participated in creation of Revolution and Justice. Arrested in July 2014 in Bouar by MINUSCA, subsequently transferred to Belgium where he was sentenced in absentia to life imprisonment for murder.
- Waluba Espilodja † – RJ commander, killed by MISCA in Gadoulou village near Paoua on 14 August 2014.
- Luther Betuban
- Elie Sénapu.
- Laurent Mandjou.
- Delfin Belonga † – RJ commander, killed by MNLRC in Bétoko in December 2017.

== Séléka ==
- Michel Djotodia (surrendered) – former leader of Séléka and president of the Central African Republic since 2013 to 2014.
- Mahamat Said Abdel Kani – Séléka general, accused of torturing prisoners in 2013 in Bangui, arrested in 2021, trial started in 2022.
- Djouma Narkoyo – former spokesman of Séléka, arrested in April 2022 near border with Cameroon for war crimes committed in 2013.
- Abdel Kader Kallil – Séléka general, accused of war crimes committed in 2013, arrested on 23 October 2022.
- Mahamat Saleh † – ex-chief of general staff in charge of operations for Seleka, killed in French operation in Bangui on 10 December 2013. (not to be confused with FPRC general with the same name)
- Markani Hamat – former Séléka commander, responsible for killing a taxi driver in 2015 in Bangui. Sentenced to life imprisonment on 19 July 2018.
- Saïd Souleymane † – Séléka general of Sudanese origin, killed on 21 January 2014 while withdrawing from Bouar.
- General Yaya † – Séléka commander in Bossangoa, killed on 5 December 2013 in Bangui.
- Mahamad Zine † – Séléka zone commander in Batangafo in 2014, killed in clashes with Sangaris forces.
- Mohamed Assil – Séléka zone commander in Batangafo in 2014.
- Ahmed Sherif – Séléka zone commander in Nzacko in 2014.
- Beya Djouma – Séléka zone commander in Sam Ouandja in 2014.

== Séléka rénovée ==
In 2021 Séléka rénovée fully disarmed and no longer has any fighters

- Mohamed Moussa Dhaffane – former leader of Séléka rénovée.
- Hissene Akacha – general coordinator of Séléka rénovée.
- Ali Issaka – provincial site coordinator of Séléka rénovée.

== Siriri ==
- Ba(o)ro Ndianigue alias "Ardo Abba" – Cameroonian Fulani, formerly leader of Siriri, his group eventually merged into 3R.
- Mahamat Djibrila † – self-proclaimed colonel, started as UPC zone commander, later switched to Siriri armed group in Mamberei-Kadei prefecture. Killed in April 2018 by MINUSCA peacekeepers.
- Nbango – active in 2018.
- Théophile – replaced Djibrila in Noufou.
- Dogo – active in 2018 in Dilapoko.

== Union for Peace in the Central African Republic (UPC) ==
Note: UPC general from Bouba factions are listed under Former UPC section

- **Ali Darassa** – leader of UPC.
- **Abakar Amadou** – UPC general from Haut-Mbomou, in late December 2022 he reportedly withdrew from disarmanement process.
- **Abdoulaye Machai** (or Makai, Massai) – self-proclaimed colonel, former commander of Mobaye since at least 2019, refused to join Bouba faction in October 2021. Participated in hostage taking in 2023 in Sikkikede.
- **Ousman Mahamat Haraka** – deputy head of CPC column in Bamingui-Bangoran, ethnic Fulani.
- **Walchai**
- Idriss Ibrahim Khalil alias Bin Laden – arrested on 23 July 2022 for his participation in 2018 Alindao massacre.
- Saleh Ngaïna † – killed by Russian mercenaries in June 2021.
- Ali Tato † – executed by Russian mercenaries on 7 December 2020 while trying to surrender.
- Didier Wangaï † – killed in clashes with pro-government faction of Anti-balaka in Gallougou village on 15 December 2020. His head was cut off and shown in Bambari.
- Djibril † – 3R commander in the Dilapoko area in 2020. Later joined UPC and in March 2022 assassinated by his own men near Grimari out of suspicion of colluding with the Russians.
- **Ibrahim Garga** – UPC general active in Ouaka province. In May 2023 based in Mingala subprefecture.
- **Kante** – In February 2022 based near Mobaye with around 100 men. in May 2023 based in Mingala subprefecture.
- Souleyman Daouda – member of UPC, in 2019 he became a minister in Touadera government. Died on 23 August 2020.
- Douha Mahamat † – killed in clashes with Wagner Group in Alindao on 9 January 2020.
- Mahamat Abdoulaye Garba – UPC political coordinator, arrested on 24 January 2021 near French embassy, transferred in August 2022 to Ngaragba prison.
- Mamath Petit † - UPC general, kidnapped sister of mayor of Bambouti on 25 January 2023. killed by Azande Ani Kpi GBE in Bambouti on 15 March 2023.
- Ali Samtiago † - Killed in a clash with the South Sudanese armed group in Bambouti in November 2020.
- Hamadou Robo - UPC commander, surrendered to the government forces on 6 January 2022 in Ngakobo.
- Ahmat Wadal Woundal – responsible for massacre of 17 civilians in Ippy in December 2017.
- Zakaria Santiago – nominated by Ali Darassa in 2014.
- Amadou Bello Hissen – nominated by Ali Darassa in 2014.
- Ismael Ayero – deputy of colonel Kamiss in 2015.
- Mahamat Bandi – attacked Bolo village in 2015 killing 10 civilians.

== Union of Republican Forces (URF) ==
On 4 December 2022 official dissolution of the group was signed in Bangui

- Wagramale (surrendered)

== Union of Republican Forces–Fundamentale (URF-F) ==
On 4 December 2022 official dissolution of the group was signed in Bangui

- Askin Nzenge Landa (surrendered)
- Régis Ngbenzi (surrendered) – former members of UFR-F, nominated subprefect of Mongoumba in 2019.
