= Bossemptélé massacre =

Terrorist incident in Central African Republic

Coordinates: 5.6811°N 16.6352°E

- Part of Central African Republic Civil War
- Location: Bossemptélé, Ouham-Pendé, Central African Republic
- Date: 18 January 2014
- Target: Muslim civilians
- Attack type: Massacre
- Weapons: Firearms, machetes
- Deaths: 100+ (including two perpetrators)
- Perpetrator: Anti-balaka

On 18 January 2014 more than 100 people were killed by Anti-balaka militias in Bossemptélé in the Ouham-Pendé prefecture of the Central African Republic.

== Attack ==
On 17 January 2014 Séléka fighters withdrew from Bossemptélé. With international forces largely absent, the next day Anti-balaka fighters attacked the city. The few armed Muslims and Séléka fighters who remained in the city tried to resist but were defeated. Anti-balaka then attacked Muslim civilians killing some of them. Some Muslims fled the city, while some took refuge at local Catholic mission. According to Amnesty International, more than 100 civilians were killed during this massacre, including a 70-year old imam. Most victims were adult men, but also included women, children and elders. Two days later four Muslim women were killed by Anti-balaka fighters. Local religious officials tried to contact international forces to secure city for two weeks with no response.

== Aftermath ==
On 1 March 2014, African peacekeepers evacuated 190 people from Bossemptélé, but 65 people were left behind including women, children and people with disabilities who were unable to climb onto the trucks. In April, French forces came to the town and Anti-balaka fighters dismantled their checkpoints and returned to local villages.
