= Irabanda =

- Location in Central African Republic
- Coordinates: 5°56′58″N 22°4′11″E
- Country: Central African Republic
- Prefecture: Haute-Kotto
- Sub-prefecture: Bria
- Commune: Daho-Mboutou

Irabanda, often written as Irrabanda, is a village situated in Haute-Kotto Prefecture, Central African Republic.

== History ==
In 1962, Irabanda had a population of 190 people.

During the Central African Republic Civil War, Irabanda hosted a base for Anti-balaka warlord, Thierry Pelenga, until his surrender on 31 July 2021. The villagers fled Irabanda in June 2018 due to the clash between FPRC and Anti-balaka.

An armed group entered Irabanda and established camp near the health center in May 2026, causing the residents to be vigilant when they wanted to go to the fields or other settlements.

== Education ==
There is a school in the village.

== Healthcare ==
Irabanda has one health center. In August 2018, an armed militia attacked the health center multiple times, killing the head of the health center and looting the facilities. In May 2026, the health center workers fled from the village due to the incursion of armed group.
