= Boyabane =

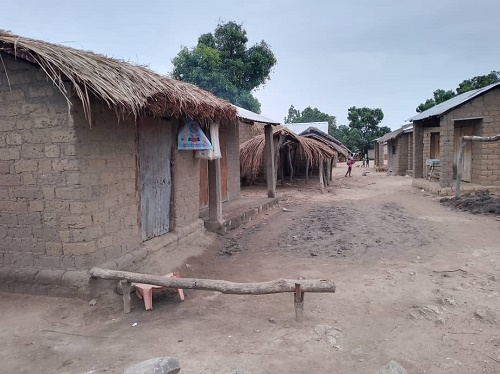
- Boyabane

- Location in Central African Republic
- Coordinates: 6°7′40″N 16°29′41″E
- Country: Central African Republic
- Prefecture: Ouham-Pendé
- Sub-prefecture: Bossemptélé
- Commune: Binon

Boyabane is a village situated in Ouham-Pendé Prefecture, Central African Republic.

== History ==
Séléka attacked Boyabane on 10 January 2014 and killed four people. 3R rebels occupied the village and erected a checkpoint on 10 July 2021.

== Economy ==
The locals cultivate cassava and peanut as their staple food. There is a weekly market in Boyabane.

== Education ==
Boyabane has a school.

== Healthcare ==
There is a health post in Boyabane.
