= Thierry Pelenga =

Central African militant

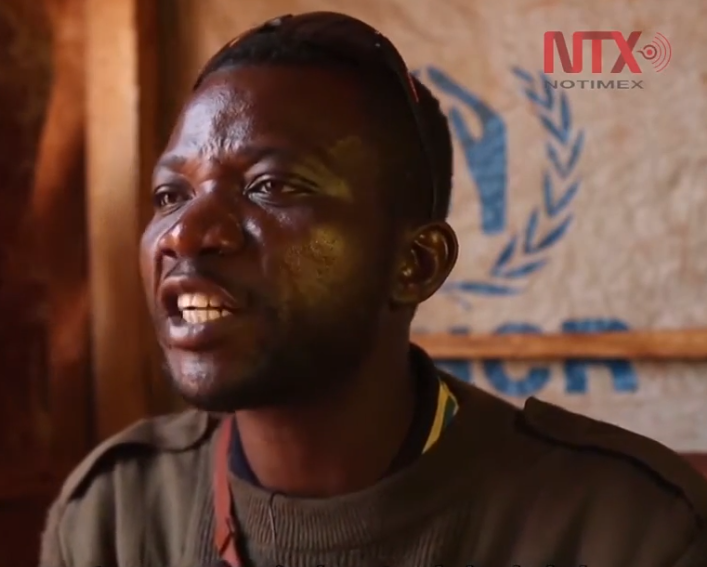
- Pelenga in 2018
- Born: 1982 or 1983
- Died: Early March 2024; Bria, Central African Republic
- Other name: Bokassa
- Military career
- Allegiance: Anti-balaka
- Service years: 2018 – 2021

Thierry François Pelenga alias Bokassa (1982 or 1983 – early March 2024) was an Anti-balaka leader and war criminal from Haute-Kotto prefecture in the Central African Republic.

== Life ==
As a member of Banda ethnic group, Pelenga was a leader of one of the Banda self-defense groups in Bria under influence of FPRC. In June 2016, he was elected zone commander of Bria's subprefecture. Maxime Mokom reportedly approached him and tried to persuade him to join Anti-balaka forces. Initially he refused.

In February 2018, he was reportedly one of leaders of Anti-balaka in PK3 camp in Bria, Central African Republic, together with Jean-Francis Diandi, also known as Ramazani. At this point he was 35 years old. In June 2018, he killed four women in the village of Gbre, five kilometers from Bria. The next day, his fighters killed three people.

In December 2020, he left Bria to join Coalition of Patriots for Change in Bambari. Later he returned with his fighters to Bria-Igrabanda road. Several cases of sexual violence have been reported since his arrival. In July 2021 he was reportedly based in Irabanda south of Bria. On 31 July he agreed to disarm himself as well as 50 of his fighters. Government forces collected 104 small weapons and 12 heavy weapons. In February 2024, he called for his former fighters who didn't surrender to join the disarmanement process. He died in early March 2024 following illness.
