= Ngouroundou =

- Location in Central African Republic
- Coordinates: 6°23′46″N 22°30′23″E
- Country: Central African Republic
- Prefecture: Haute-Kotto
- Sub-prefecture: Bria
- Commune: Daba-Nydou

Ngouroundou is a village situated in Haute-Kotto Prefecture, Central African Republic.

== History ==
CPC element of UPC led by Mahamet Saleh attacked Ngouroundou on 5 December 2021 to retrieve their stolen items. During the attack, they killed five people, including two-months baby, and burned twenty houses. CPC's attack caused the residents to flee to the surrounding villages and Bria.

== Education ==
There is a school in Ngouroundou.
