= Battle of Nzacko =

2022 battle in Central African Republic

- Part of Central African Republic Civil War
Date	March 5 – May 25, 2022
Location	Nzacko, Mbomou, Central African Republic
Result	FACA/Wagner victory

Belligerents
FACA; Wagner Group	Coalition of Patriots for Change: FPRC; UPC

Commanders and leaders
Adja Kaltouma Gandja	Mahamet Saleh

Casualties and losses
17–22+ killed, 2 captured 2 killed	11+ killed 3+ injured
- 2+ killed

The battle of Nzacko took place from March 5, 2022 to May 25, 2022, with Coalition of Patriots for Change (CPC) fighters from the Popular Front for the Rebirth of Central African Republic (FPRC) and Union for Peace in the Central African Republic (UPC) fighting against FACA and allied Wagner Group mercenaries.

== Prelude ==
Nzacko is a town in Bakouma sub-prefecture in the Central African Republic. Between 2017 and 2019, the area was heavily controlled by the Popular Front for the Rebirth of Central African Republic (FPRC) and Union for Peace in the Central African Republic (UPC) rebels, until MINUSCA and FACA captured the sub-prefectural capital of Bakouma in early 2019. In late 2020 and early 2021, during the 2020–21 Central African general election that saw Faustin-Archange Touadéra come to power, the FPRC, UPC, and several other rebel groups amalgamated to create the Coalition of Patriots for Change, which exercised control over Nzacko. The Wagner Group and Syrian mercenaries, aiding FACA, captured Nzacko in April 2021 following the CPC's withdrawal from the town. Central African forces left Nzacko in December 2021.

The CPC faction in Nzacko is led by Mahamat Saleh, a leader of the FPRC. Salleh has been implicated in rape cases and other human rights abuses in Haute-Kotto prefecture.

== Battle ==
The first attacks on Nzacko in 2022 occurred on March 5. A day prior to the attacks, Wagner mercenaries left Bria to capture Nzacko and the town of Yalinga. However, CPC rebels in control of Nzacko were prepared for Wagner forces, and were ambushed by the CPC around 4pm that day. Five rebels were killed and three were injured in the attack, and two Wagner were killed and two injured. The CPC then vacated the city, allowing Wagner to capture it. After Wagner captured the town, the residents cheered and held celebrations for the Wagner mercenaries. The Wagner mercenaries left three days later back to Bria, and the CPC returned shortly after. Angered at the locals' reactions to Wagner's presence, CPC fighters shot two civilians. Civilians then tried to flee to Bakouma.

Central African forces returned to Nzacko on March 27, solidifying control over the town after a small firefight with CPC fighters in the nearby village of Gbolo on March 29.

The next attack on Nzacko occurred at 4am on April 28, when UPC fighters attacked a MINUSCA and FACA base in Nzacko. Between six and eleven FACA soldiers were killed in the attacks, and four CPC fighters were killed. The CPC fighters then looted Nzacko, before fleeing back into the bush. The mayor of Nzako, Adja Kaltouma Gandja, confirmed the attack. After the CPC attack, FACA deserted the town, and only two of the many soldiers who fled to Bria had weapons. Wagner mercenaries entered the town not long afterward, and attempted to persuade FACA commanders to return, but FACA refused, citing mistreatment from Wagner.

The FACA base in Nzacko was attacked againon May 21, with UPC fighters surrounding a contingent of FACA soldiers and laying siege to the town. Eleven soldiers were killed including the commander of the contingent, and one was captured, with the remaining thirty soldiers left in the base without arms and being fed by the locals. In that same attack, two rebels were killed. During the CPC attack on Nzacko, civilians fled into the bush to avoid capture by the fighters. Wagner forces sent out reinforcements to Nzacko on May 24. Later, CPC fighters announced that two soldiers were captured in the attack. This was denied by the Central African government. Wagner and FACA recaptured Nzacko on May 25, with MINUSCA setting up a base that same day.

== Aftermath ==
In early June, MINUSCA established a base in Nzacko, confirming FACA control. CPC fighters attacked Bakouma on June 23, but the aftermath is unknown.
