= Bienvenue Nguiambi =

Central African militant

- Born: Yehou, Basse-Kotto, Central African Republic
- Military career
- Allegiance: Anti-balaka
- Service years: 2019 – 2025

Signature
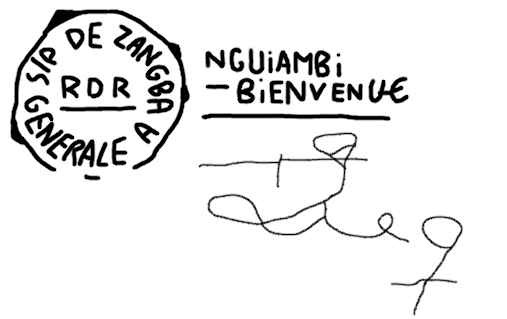

Bienvenue Nguiambi – is an Anti-balaka commander from Yehou village in Basse-Kotto prefecture in the Central African Republic, responsible for multiple crimes against civilians including kidnappings for ransom and murder.

== Life ==
He was born in Yehou village in Zangba subprefecture in Basse-Kotto, as a son of the former President of the Special Delegation of the Commune of Yabongo. In 2019 when security situation in his region has worsened during the civil war he became an Anti-balaka leader. With advice of his father he set up a number of checkpoints along the Oubangui river demanding payment of 100,000 to 200,000 CFA francs for travel. He commanded around 10 men, based on an island on the river.

In March 2019 when a group of eleven women with three children and three young people attempted to cross the river to reach the Democratic Republic of the Congo, Anti-balaka fighters led by Nguiambi, supported by Anti-balaka commanders Francis and Grace à Dieu Bedambe ambushed them. They tied up the eldest youth who was around 18-year old and forced the women into four pirogues. They moved them into Kesse island, and then Yamboro where they beat the youth until he passed out. They threw him into the water, after which he was shot dead by one of fighters. They divided the women into two groups, one of which went with Nguiambi to Yeo island. Eventually Nguiambi moved them all to one island, with some of them being raped by his fighters. After moving them back and forth between different islands he eventually said that he will kill them unless their families pay 120,000 CFA Francs (about $200) in ransom. Eventually all women were released in April 2019, but as of September 2019 some of them were still paying back ransom to their families or other debtors.

On 18 January 2021 he kidnapped six Congolese fishermen, including two minors aged 10 and 14 near Pito island. While transferring them to Yehou, one of them named Gbeto Verekota managed to escape. He said that he was tortured together with his brother and they broke his arm. He reportedly demanded 500.000 CFA Francs in ransom for each victim. Congolese army managed to free them a few days later.

On 16 July 2022 FACA soldiers based in Mobaye attacked his base with a gunboat. His fighters fired at them, after which soldiers fired back. He managed to flee, but one of his fighters was killed. His father was arrested as well as his older brother who was arrested next day after going to Mobaye. In early August he sent a declaration to local authorities supporting freedom of movement on Oubangui river. Following correspondence with the subprefect of Zangba on 29 August he decided to meet with his authorities in Mafounga village. He handed over 40 AK-47s, one anti-tank grenade; two outfits, 49 pieces of AK ammo as well as five empty magazines. However he refused to surrender or fully disarm due to persistent threat from UPC rebels in the region. In August 2025 it was reported that his fighters were disarmed and dissatisfied with lack of integration into the army.
