= Black Russians =

Armed group in the Central African Republic

- Russes noirs
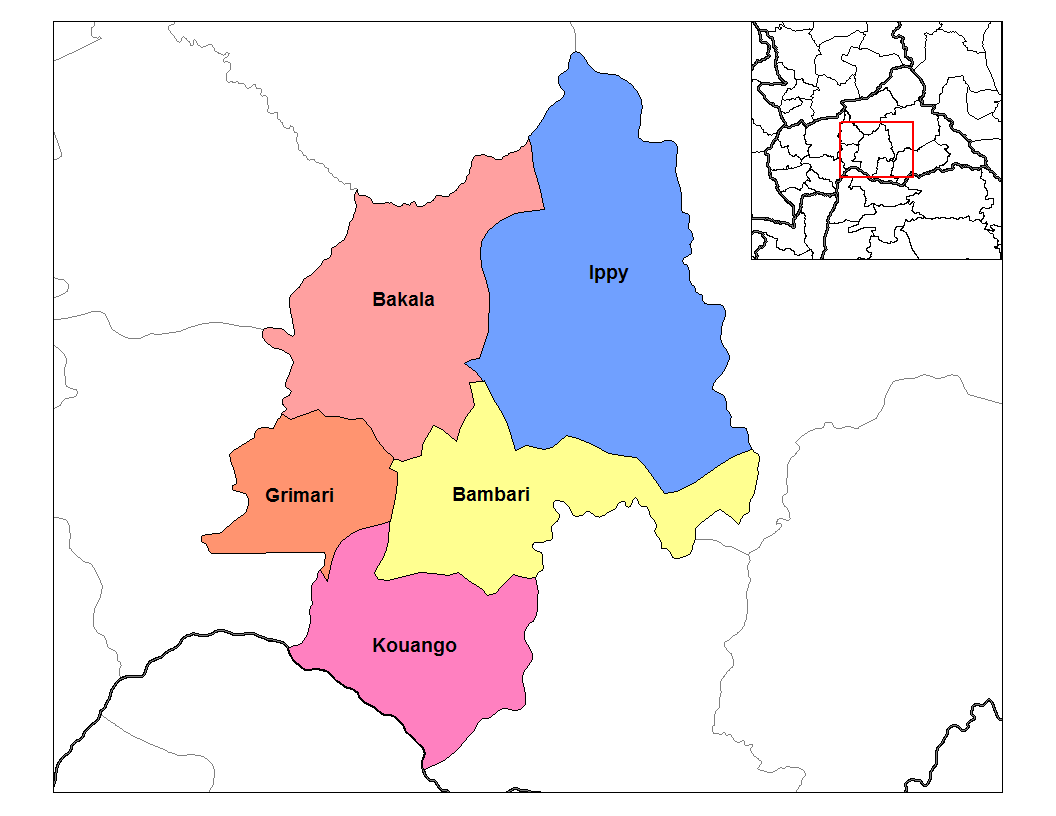
- Ouaka prefecture, where Black Russians are most active
- Leader: Multiple leaders
- Dates active: 2021–present
- Active regions: Ouaka
- Size: 3,000+
- Wars: Central African Republic Civil War; Russian invasion of Ukraine (alleged)

Black Russians (French: Russes noirs) is an unofficial name given to a group of pro–government militias in the Central African Republic, recruited mostly from former Anti-Balaka and UPC fighters by Wagner Group. The militias have been accused of multiple war crimes and crimes against humanity.

== History ==
In August 2021 security forces approached a former Anti-balaka leader in Bambari and asked him to remobilize his fighters to fight against UPC rebels. FACA operations in Boyo against UPC elements resumed on 24 November 2021, causing numerous injuries and deaths on both sides among the opposing parties. New fighting took place in Boyo on the night of 26–27 November. Operations continued on the roads leading to Boyo, which reportedly resulted in a number of civilian deaths and additional injuries.

In November 2021, around 240 Anti-balaka fighters on board of six Russian military vehicles left Bambari towards Tagbara. From there they continued on foot through the village of Zoumoko and, on 1 December 2021, Atongo-Bakari before reaching Boyo, with the objective of neutralizing the UPC rebels and their accomplices. Between 6 and 16 December 2021, militias murdered more than 27 Muslim civilians in Boyo and neighboring villages.

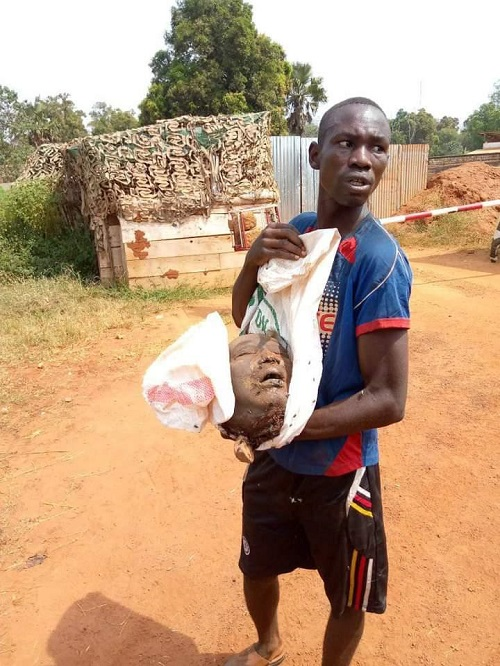
A "Black Russian" with the severed head of Didier Wangay, the former mayor of Bambari and an UPC general

On 11 December 2021, they attacked Goya village near Kouango, killing 10 civilians. On 25 December 18 people were killed and 29 injured by pro-government faction of Anti-balaka in Lougba and Mandjo village on Bambari-Bakala axis. They were also responsible for killing 23 people in Fulani camp near Bokolobo on 9 May 2022.

In October 2022, pro–government Anti-balaka forces led by general Ayoloma, clashed with pro-CPC Anti-balaka in Ndjoukou village.

Black Russians have been accused of responsibility for 2023 Chimbolo massacre.

In July 2023, following composition of Black Russian has been reported: general Royal active between Bakala and Lougba, general Akra around Atongo-Bakari, general Dix-Roues around Boyo, general Sossengue around Tagbara, generals Marcelin Orogo and "Jojo" around Bambari. Pro-government Anti-balaka general Dimitri Ayoloma is active between Kemo and Ombella-Mpoko prefectures. Former UPC fighters who joined Black Russians are led by colonel Kiri, “Sanda”, and “Salambaye”.

=== Other areas ===
In 2022, at least 100 "Black Russians" were reported to have been deployed by the Wagner Group in Ukraine, especially in Bakhmut. They have been also reported to be recruited in Mali.

== See also ==
- Wagner Group activities in the Central African Republic
- Black Russian (cocktail)
