= Armel Sayo =

Central African politician and warlord

Ministry of Modernization of Administration and Public Service Innovation
- In office 2 April 2020 – 19 February 2021
- President: Faustin-Archange Touadéra
- Prime Minister: Firmin Ngrébada
- Preceded by: Nabia Haroune
- Succeeded by: Marcel Djimassé (Civil Service and Administrative Reform)

Minister of Habitat and Housing
- In office 29 October 2015 – 11 April 2016
- President: Catherine Samba-Panza
- Prime Minister: Mahamat Kamoun
- Preceded by: Nicaise Karnou-Samedi
- Succeeded by: Gaby Francky Leffa

Minister of Youth and Sports
- In office 22 August 2014 – 29 October 2015
- President: Catherine Samba-Panza
- Prime Minister: Mahamat Kamoun
- Preceded by: Abdoulaye Hissène
- Succeeded by: Nicaise Karnou-Samedi

Personal details
- Born: 17 August 1979 (age 46) Bangui, Central African Republic
- Occupation: Pastor; Politician; Warlord
- Website: armelsayo.com

Military service
- Rank: Captain
- Military career
- Allegiance: FACA; Revolution and Justice (2013–2019); Military Coalition for the Salvation of the People and Recovery (2024-present)
- Conflicts: Central African Republic Civil War

Armel Mingatoloum Sayo (born 17 August 1979), also known as Armel Bedaya or Commandant Sayo, is a Central African politician and warlord who served in three different ministerial positions under Panza and Touadera's presidencies. He also served as the leader of Revolution and Justice until its disarmament in 2019.

== Early life and military career ==
Sayo was born on 17 August 1979 in Bangui. His biological father's name is Sayo Robert, an accountant at Bangui Chamber of Commerce and Industry. He was later adopted by Simon Bédaya-Ngaro. Under Patassé administration, Sayo was the country's Director of Security. After the 2003 coup, an armed group entered his house and attempted to assassinate Sayo, his mother, father, brothers. The groups then left, and he evacuated his father by disguising him as a woman to the Nigerian Embassy.

In February 2004, while Sayo was treated at the Military Hospital Center of Camp Fidel Obrou, a militia tried to abduct him. However, he managed to get away from the kidnapping attempt, thanks to his aunt. Afterward, he and his family fled to France for medical treatment and security reasons.

In 2008, Sayo became the leader of APRD. From 2010 to 2011, Sayo was in charge of Patasse's security. The Gendarmerie arrested Sayo on 28 February 2011 in Bangui during a trip accompanied by FOMAC soldiers under the accusation of arms dealing. Responding to the arrest, Patasse supporters held a demonstration in front of the gendarmerie headquarters on 12 March 2011 demanding Sayo's release. Later, he was released and returned to France.

== 2012–2019 ==
=== Seleka and Revolution and Justice ===
From 2012 to 2013, Sayo served as Seleka's spokesperson. However, he later defected from Seleka in March 2013 and founded Comité national pour la restauration de la démocratie (CNRD) in Ouham-Pendé. The group allied with FDPC and provided reinforcement forces to FDPC during the clashes with Seleka in early April 2013. On 17 April 2013, FDPC and CNRD joined the Union des forces armées centrafricaines pour la restauration de la démocratie (UFACARD) alliance.

Sayo and François Toussaint founded RJ in October 2013. On 1 November 2023, Sayo and Toussaint crossed the Central African Republic – Cameroon border in the Baiboon region and established RJ's first camp at the outskirts of Paoua. In January 2014, Sayo asked Chad to support RJ, yet it never came to the group. In June 2014, Sayo was reported to have commanded 60 militias in Gadoulou, Bang, and Bodjomo. Apart from that, he planned RJ for a march to Bangui to express their discontent with the central government neglecting the northern part. He also signed the Brazzaville Agreement on Cessation of Hostilities in the Central African Republic on 23 July 2014 as RJ's representative. In the Bangui National Forum, he was also one of the signatories of the agreement on the disarmament of armed groups.

=== Minister of Sports and Housing ===
Mahamat Kamoun appointed Sayo as the Minister of Youth and Sport on 22 August 2014. During his tenure as the minister of sports, he suspended the funding of Central African Athletes to compete in international tournaments due to financial constraints and the mixed results. He also signed agreement with NGO IPHD to provide assistance to Central African Basketball Federation in training technical coaches. Despite his position as the minister of sport, he still provided financial support to RJ for its defense against intruders from Chad.

An alleged Anti-balaka group commanded by Rodrigue Ngaibona abducted Sayo in the Galabadja neighborhood of Bangui on 24 January 2015 after attending church services and brought him to the group's stronghold in Boy-Rabe. The group's abduction aimed to release its detained commander in exchange for Sayo. Moreover, the kidnapper also demanded Sayo's family to pay a ransom of 4 million CFA francs. Nevertheless, Anti-balaka denied their involvement in the kidnapping. Sayo then released on 11 February 2015.

Sayo served as the Minister of Housing and Habitat on 30 October 2015. His tenure as the minister was marked by controversies as the mayor of Berberati blamed him for illegally selling government properties in the town to the persons that close to Sayo.

=== 2016–2019 ===
Sayo's inclusion into the government cabinet caused issues among the RJ high-ranking officers Raymond Belanga and Captain Fisher, as he no longer did daily interaction and transferred money to the group members. As a result, Sayo was dismissed as the group's leader on 22 April 2016. Sayo, however, challenged his dismissal as the leader by creating the new group's structure that placed him as the leader when he visited Paoua on 21 and 22 September and it received mixed reaction within the group. Sayo's leadership was endorsed by Colonel Luther, while Belanga rejected it, causing the group to be split into two factions, RJ/Sayo and RJ/Belanga.

Sayo signed the Central African Republic peace accord at the Sant'Egidio headquarters in Rome on 19 June 2017 as RJ representative. Large Coalition of Central Africans held a Congress in Mingala on 25 to 27 November 2017, which resulted in the creation of Siriri coalition and named Sayo as the Coordinator for Army Reform. However, he rejected the position that Siriri offered. Sayo reportedly worked as a pastor at the Protestant Church of Elim in Bangui in January 2018. On 6 August 2019, he signed Khartoum Peace Agreement as the RJ representative which resulted in the group to be disarmed. In return, he became the High Commissioner of the National Pioneer Youth. As the high commissioner, he signed partnership agreement with France through its ambassador in Bangui to provide job employment to the youth on 19 March 2019.

== 2020–present ==
Ngrébada appointed Sayo as the Minister of Modernization of Administration and Public Service Innovation to fill the vacant position since Abdoulaye Miskine refused to accept that position. He announced his presidential candidacy for the 2020 election and submitted files to the national authority on 1 November 2020. However, the Constitutional Court rejected his candidacy on 3 December 2020 as he was on the wanted list for embezzlement of a sum of 18,000,000 CFA francs.

In December 2020, he joined CPC rebel coalition. Due to his link to the CPC rebels, Touadera sacked Sayo as the minister on 19 February 2021. Moreover, the gendarmerie and the police also raided his house and issued arrest warrant.

As of June 2023, Sayo worked as an evangelical pastor and called the people and FACA to support him in toppling Touadera. In 2024, Sayo became the leader of an armed group Military Coalition for the Salvation of the People and Recovery (CMSPR).

Cameroon arrested Sayo in Douala International Airport on 17 January 2025 when he wanted to board a flight to France. The Cameroon authorities extradited Sayo to Central African Republic on 5 May 2025 after being detained in Yaoundé for more than three months and received extradition approval from France.

== Personal life ==
Sayo holds dual citizenship with the Central African Republic and France. He is married to Nicaise Danielle Sayo.

== Bibliography ==
- UN Security Council (29 October 2014). Letter dated 28 October 2014 from the Panel of Experts on the Central African Republic established pursuant to Security Council resolution 2127 (2013) addressed to the President of the Security Council (PDF) (Report).
