= Jennifer Saraiva Yanzere =

Central African Republic's minister of Arts, Culture and Tourism

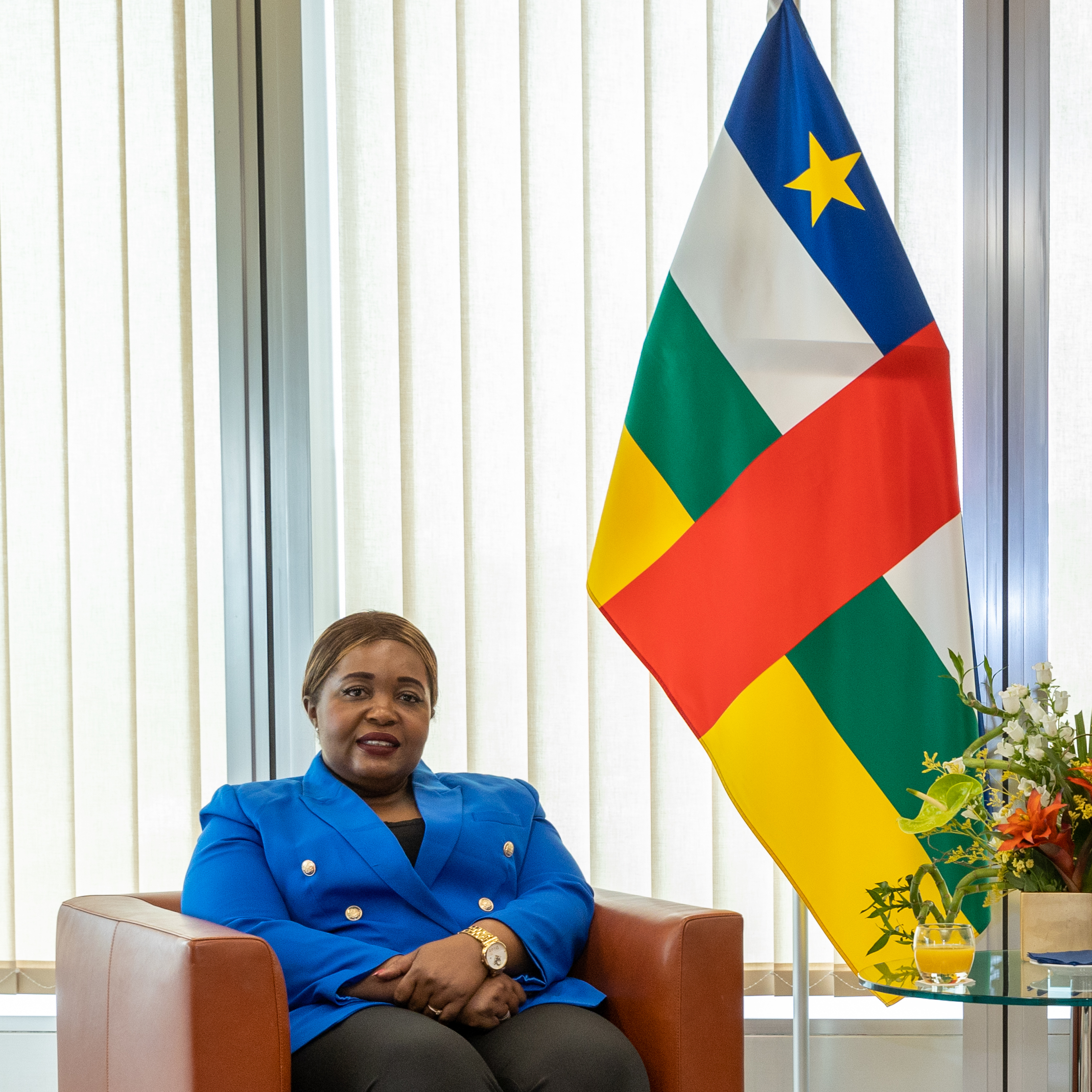
- Yanzere in 2022

Minister of Arts, Culture and Tourism
- In office 24 June 2021 – 4 January 2024
- President: Faustin-Archange Touadéra
- Prime Minister: Henri-Marie Dondra; Félix Moloua
- Preceded by: Dieudonné Ndomaté
- Succeeded by: Ngola Françoise Ramadan Mahata

Personal details
- Born: 1979 (age 46–47)
- Occupation: Politician; Sales; Businesswomen

Vincente Maria Lionelle Jennifer Saraiva - Yanzere, also known as Jennifer Doraz, (born 1979) is a Central African politician who served as the Minister of Arts, Culture, and Tourism from 2021 to 2024.

== Early life and career ==
Yanzere was born in 1979 to a Portuguese father and a Central African mother from Ouango. She worked as a sales agent at MagForce for the Central Africa region. She founded a cultural association that aimed to promote Bantu culture, Reine Bantou. In 2015, she organized the first Reine Bantou gala. She arranged the second organization's gala, the Gala of African Royalty, in 2018 and the event elected a Bantu queen.

Yanzere then moved to France and worked at a company that supported the elders. While working in France, she founded the Association for Support to Touadera in 2019 and became the general coordinator of the organization.

== Minister of Arts, Culture and Tourism ==
Dondra appointed Yanzere minister of arts, culture, and tourism on 24 June 2021. She aimed to make the Central African Republic a destination for leisure and business activities to stimulate the country's economic growth. Yanzere founded the National Artistic Ensemble in July 2021. On 19 July 2022, she commenced the tourism development policy. She also suspended the activities of the Union of Musicians of the Central African Republic (UMC) on 10 October 2023 due to internal conflict within the organization. While serving as the minister, Yanzere participated in the 2023 Central African constitutional referendum campaign by joining pro-referendum group as the vice president of Mobilization and Propaganda Commission.

Nevertheless, Yanzere tenure as minister was marked by controversies. She banned the "We, Students" documentary because it " incited revolution against the government." Previously, she walked out from the documentary screening in Bangui. Apart from that, she embezzled the government's artist subsidy for Yanzere and her staff's personal gain.

== Post ministerial career ==
Yanzere stepped down as the minister of arts, culture, and tourism on 4 January 2024 and the position was replaced by Ngola Françoise Ramadan Mahata. Afterward, she joined the mining company Gold Koss Group and became the company's CEO.
