= 2021 Boyo killings =

Massacre in the Central African Republic

Coordinates: 5.7258°N 21.4857°E

Boyo killings
- Part of Central African Republic Civil War
- Location: Boyo, Ouaka, Central African Republic
- Date: 6–16 December 2021
- Target: UPC rebels, Muslim civilians
- Attack type: Massacre
- Weapons: Firearms, grenades, machetes
- Deaths: 20 killed
- Injuries: 12+ injured
- Victim: 1,500 displaced
- Perpetrator: Anti-balaka (pro-government faction)
- No. of participants: 240
- Motive: Islamophobia
- Accused: Edmond Obrou Patrick; Nzapawouyome Bernard alias "Sossengué"; Gonede Jospin alias "Jojo"
- Charges: War crimes; Crimes against humanity

Between 6 and 16 December 2021, a number of Muslim civilians were killed and injured by Anti-balaka fighters supported by government forces and Russian mercenaries in the Boyo commune, located in the Ouaka prefecture of the Central African Republic (CAR). These civilians were attacked for their alleged links with Union for Peace in the Central African Republic (UPC) rebels. The attacks are part of the larger CAR Civil War which has been ongoing since 2012.

== Prelude ==
In August 2021, security forces approached former Anti-balaka leader in Bambari and asked him to remobilizie his fighters to fight against UPC rebels. FACA operations in Boyo against UPC elements resumed on 24 November 2021, causing numerous injuries and deaths among the opposing parties. New fighting took place in Boyo on the night of 26-27 November. Operations continued on the roads leading to Boyo, which reportedly resulted in a number of civilian deaths and injuries. In November 2021 around 240 Anti-balaka fighters on board six Russian military vehicles left Bambari towards Tagbara. From there they continued on foot through the village of Zoumoko and, on 1 December 2021, Atongo-Bakari before reaching Boyo, with the objective of neutralizing the UPC rebels and their accomplices.

== Events ==
=== Massacre ===
On 6 December 2021, at dawn, according to concordant sources, around 240 assailants, mainly men but among them eight women, at the very least, entered the village of Boyo, under the command of the Anti-balaka general Edmond. They were described by witnesses as wearing mostly civilian clothes and armed with home-made guns, Kalashnikovs and grenades, but mainly with bladed weapons such as machetes. At the same time, residents heard the first gunshots, including a stray bullet fatally hitting a 12-year-old girl. Between 6 a.m. and 6:30 a.m., the assailants forced Muslim men from Boyo to gather at the market place, sparing the Christians, under the threat of their weapons. At this place, they demanded that everyone present an identity document and pay a sum ranging from 3,000 to 5,000 CFA francs to be released. The assailants also seized several motorcycles and demanded amounts varying between 10,000 and 40,000 CFA francs for each individual who wanted to recover his motorcycle. On the same day, around 6:30 p.m., three anti-Balaka leaders under the command of Edmond sent one of their fighters to summon the interim mayor of Boyo and two other members of the Muslim community. Upon the arrival of these three representatives, the Anti-balaka leaders accused the Muslim inhabitants of Boyo of being rebels and threatened to kill them all at the first shot of the UPC rebels. The three anti-balaka leaders said they had been sent by the government to drive out the UPC rebels and that they planned to stay there for a month.

On 7 December 2021, around 5 a.m., armed elements identified as UPC fighters tried to counterattack with firearms but were routed by the much more numerous Anti-balaka attackers. Following this attempted incursion, the attackers set fire to houses, specifically targeting dwellings belonging to Muslims. If, by mistake, houses of Christian inhabitants were set on fire, they extinguished the fire themselves. Around 7 a.m., the attackers then gathered Muslim men, women and children inside and around the mosque, between 700 and 800 people according to concordant testimonies. Edmond, one of the Anti-balaka leaders, took a grenade in his hand, threatening to kill all the villagers gathered in the mosque. The acting mayor of Boyo knelt before him, waving the CAR national flag, and kept begging him for 30 minutes to reconsider before he backed down from carrying out his threat. The Muslim women and girls were released the same morning and huddled together in a few houses for safety. Between 7:30 a.m. and 4:00 p.m., the attackers executed 17 members of the Muslim community, all men, at different locations in the village of Boyo. The majority of the 17 Muslims were beheaded or slit with machetes. The head of one of the 17 victims was exposed in front of the mosque while his genitals were displayed in the village market. The bodies of the victims were picked up and buried by members of the Christian community of the village, often under the supervision of the attackers. Such was the case for 14 of them buried in a mass grave in the Muslim cemetery. According to several witnesses, some victims were buried alive, after being seriously injured with machetes. The first machete injuries were also recorded during the same period, one of the victims, a man, was interrogated at 5 a.m. on December 7, 2021, by the attackers who accused him of being a Seleka general. Around 4 p.m., this victim was beheaded by a 30-year-old woman (from Seko) designated as the aide-de-camp of Anti-balaka leader Edmond. His head was carried through Boyo by the attackers. Another man had his throat slit in the evening between 4 p.m. and 5 p.m. and was buried less than 5 meters from his place of execution.

On 8 December 2021, around 1 p.m., the attackers left Boyo in search of two Muslim brothers in their village in Komayé located 12 km from Boyo on the Tagbara axis. They found them, injured them with machetes and demanded a ransom of 5 million CFA Francs against the release of their father who was held captive at the Boyo mosque. The attackers demanded a high ransom on the grounds that the father of the two brothers owned 20 heads of oxen. On the night of December 8 to 9, 2021, while the villagers were sequestered in the Boyo mosque, groups of two to four assailants entered the homes of Muslims, forcing the doors, to loot property. Several civilians were beaten, injured and threatened with weapons. Muslim women and girls were raped in their homes or taken elsewhere and then raped without the presence of other civilians. Several cases of sexual violence were reported, five of which were confirmed by the investigation and seven others could not be confirmed.

=== Victims ===
MINUSCA investigations confirmed that the attackers intentionally targeted and killed 19 civilians, including 16 adults (men) and three minors (male), all belonging to the Muslim community. The majority of the victims were killed with knives (machetes). Six of the victims (including an underage boy) were beheaded. The assailants displayed the head and genitals of one of the beheaded men in front of the crowd of victims gathered at the mosque. Twelve victims (including a minor boy) had their throats cut. Three men had their throats cut in front of their house, then their bodies burned. Another was buried alive after being wounded with a machete. The twentieth victim, a 12-year-old girl, killed by a stray bullet, was buried by her family in a separate grave in the Muslim cemetery. The bodies of the other victims were buried in 3 mass graves: two bodies in the first grave, 14 bodies in the second grave and three bodies in the third. The investigations carried out made it possible to identify these mass graves. According to information collected by MINUSCA, an additional number of civilians were executed outside Boyo, without further details.

At least 12 people were injured, the majority of them with knives. Among the victims are two children, including a 4-year-old girl with head injuries and a 10-year-old boy with back injuries, all members of the Muslim community. A victim specifies that she was injured by three assailants with machetes brought to her head and her arm, then forced, under the threat of weapons and hand grenades brandished by the assailants, to walk to the central mosque. Losing blood, she fainted on the way. Two victims suffered amputations of their upper limbs.

=== Sexual violence ===
MINUSCA confirmed the rapes of five women, all Muslims between the ages of 25 and 37, attributed to the Anti-balaka attackers. These rapes were committed between December 7 and 13 with particular gravity, the victims having all suffered gang rapes. Among them, a victim was raped with a bottle, two assailants holding her legs apart. According to corroborating information obtained from various sources, the rapes were committed as collective punishment of the victims by the assailants who accused the victims of being wives of UPC elements. One of the victims had a baby almost two weeks old. The Boyo health center had been looted and was not operational at the time of the events, the victims were unable to access medical and psychosocial assistance. However, four of the victims were able to be consulted later by humanitarian actors who were visiting Boyo following the events. For fear of stigmatization, some victims did not inform either their husbands or their close relatives. The death toll of victims of sexual violence could be higher than that given above. Furthermore, given the absence of a telephone network and the remoteness of Boyo, one victim declared that he had not been able to go to Bambari to access care, because his identity documents, necessary to make the trip, had been burned during the fire in his house. Women and girls who fled Boyo to take refuge in Tagbara or Bambari were also affected by the event. The two-week-old baby of one of the victims died because of the poor conditions of his mother's travel following the rape she suffered.

=== Looting and destruction of property ===
UN report established following cases of property destruction: destruction by fire of 547 houses, expropriation and confiscation of more than 103 motorcycles belonging to members of the Muslim community, extortion of unspecified sums of money, looting food stocks.

=== Forced displacement ===
According to humanitarian actors, nearly 1,000 people left the city during the events. About 72 households (265 people) from Boyo have moved to Tagbara (75 km from Bambari), and are living with host families. However, after the attackers left most of the displaced people quickly returned to their homes and began to rebuild their homes, after the installation of a temporary base for MINUSCA peacekeepers and the start of food distribution.

=== Subsequent events ===
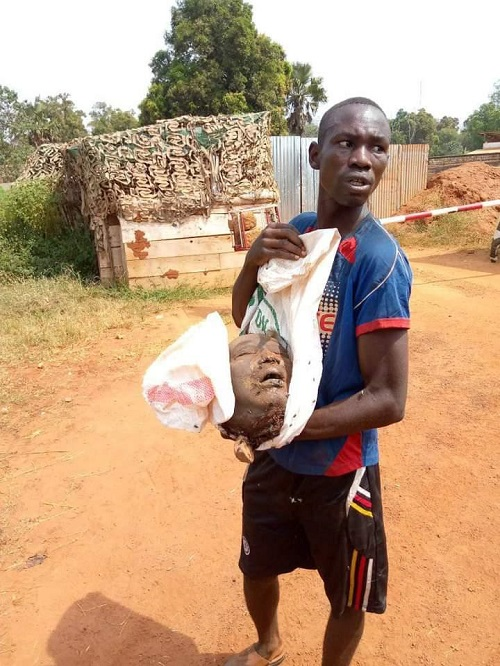
Anti-balaka fighter with severed head of Didier Wangay, former mayor of Bambari and UPC general

On December 9, 2021, an Anti-balaka leader came from Bambari and asked the victims sequestered at the mosque a payment of 5 million CFA francs for the release of all these Muslims. The sum of 2.8 million FCFA was collected from the family members of those sequestered and handed over to the attackers. They were later released the same day.

On December 10, 2021, at around 11 p.m., in Tagbara, four armed assailants traveling at high speed on four motorcycles opened fire on a MINUSCA Force patrol. The patrol, responding, put the aggressors to flight, who abandoned the four motorcycles used. As a security measure, these motorcycles have been kept at the Force's temporary operating base (BOT) in Tagbara. No deaths or injuries were reported, but 160 civilians took shelter at a MINUSCA base in Tagbara. The next day, December 11, 2021, the FACA commander stationed in Maloum sent a handwritten letter requesting the delivery of the motorcycles to the carriers. Several testimonies from victims and witnesses, including that of one of the leaders of the armed militiamen who attacked Boyo, confirmed that certain motorcycles seized by MINUSCA had been looted in the village of Boyo. On December 13, 2021, the attackers fled the village, before the arrival of the MINUSCA Force which was heading towards Boyo. They relocated to several villages around Boyo, including Atongo-Bakari, located 17km from Boyo and difficult to access due to a damaged bridge.

On 11 December, in another part of Ouaka prefecture, Anti-balaka fighters supported by FACA and Russian mercenaries attacked Goya village near Kouango, killing more than 10 Muslim civilians who had been leaving their mosque following the 15:00 prayer.

On 14 or 15 December, Anti-balaka fighters — with air support from PMC Wagner — launched an attack on Gallougou village. They arrested Didier Wangay with his family (including his son, wife, niece and nephew). He was the former mayor of Bambari and a member of the UPC until 2018. He was summarily executed along with his family and his severed head was publicly presented in Bambari.

Nouvellesplus reported that on 15 December, Boyo was attacked by Anti-balaka fighters led by General Sosengue. The attack reportedly lead to deaths and injures. It is unclear whether this news refers to already mentioned events or some other massacre. On the same day, MINUSCA peacekeeping forces were deployed to Boyo in an attempt to restore peace. They met with local authorities and the civilian population calling on communities to reconcile. Some civilians were reportedly displeased with peacekeeper deployment, demanding the presence of FACA soldiers instead.

On December 16, Anti-balaka fighters attacked Zimako village, located on the Ippy–Gallougou axis, killing five people, including two Muslims and two Christians, before withdrawing towards Boyo.

== Aftermath ==
On 19 December, about 100 survivors of the massacre reportedly arrived in Bambari aboard three vehicles.

On 24 December, the Coalition of Patriots for Change, a partnership of major CAR rebel groups including UPC, officially condemned the Boyo massacre and denied involvement, accusing mercenaries employed by government forces.

On 6 January 2022 Deputy Special Representative of the Secretary General of the United Nations and Humanitarian Coordinator, Denise Brown accompanied by the humanitarian community went on a mission in Boyo. She met with victims of violence in the community. They said that armed men stole seeds and farming equipment making it harder for civilians to grow crops.

== Legal proceedings ==
On 16 September 2023 general Edmong Obrou together with two other perpetrators, general Nzapawouyome Bernard alias "Sossengué" and general Gonede Jospin alias "Jojo" were arrested and placed in pre-trial detention. They are accused of war crimes and crimes against humanity.
