= Aaron Wilibona =

Central African politician and militant

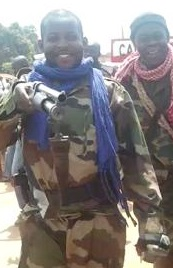
- Wilibona in January 2014 in Cantonnier, pointing his gun at camera

Member of the National Assembly
- In office 2005–2011
- Succeeded by: Jules Bernard Ouandé
- Constituency: 8th arrondissement, Bangui

Director of cabinet of Ministry of Public Health
- In office 2011–2013

Anti-balaka commander
- In office 2014 or earlier – 2015 or later

Personal details
- Born: Bangui

Aaron Wilibona (or Ouilibona) alias "Coxis" is a former Central African representative, military commander of Anti-balaka, suspected of killing French journalist Camille Lepage.

== Life ==
He is a cousin of former president François Bozizé and a younger brother of Maxime Mokom.

He used to be a chieff of staff of two ministers under the regime of Patassé and Bozizé. In the 2005 Central African general election he was elected to the National Assembly from the 8th arrondissement in Bangui, having received 7,508 or 40.44% of all votes. He was elected as a member of Kwa Na Kwa party. In 2009, he was elected President of the Kwa Na Kwa parliamentary group. In September 2010, Wilibona was reportedly regularly traversing Bangui with a submachine gun looking for information and speaking with mercenaries. In 2011, he was a director of cabinet of the Ministry of Public Health.

=== Civil war ===
Following the outbreak of the Central African Republic Civil War he joined the Anti-balaka militias. In January 2014, he reportedly took over the Cantonnier/Béloko border crossing together with Rochael Mokom alias ‘Colonel Rocco’. On 28 April, he was reportedly in charge of Anti-balaka militias between Cantonnier and Bouar. He was accused of murder of French journalist Camille Lepage in May 2014 for which he was arrested by Central African authorities. On 7 July 2015, he escaped the Ngaragba prison in Bangui after which he fled to Garoua-Boulaï in Cameroon. His personal lawyer, Raymond Ndakala, was accused of helping him in escape. On 5 September 2015, he reportedly arrived in Berbérati accompanied by eight Anti-balaka fighters.

=== Aftermath ===
On 12 September 2020, he was arrested by the Cameroonian air and border police as he was returning from a trip to Bangui and placed in pre-trial detention in Kondengui. He is accused of dishonestly obtaining 481,000,000 CFA francs stored in various bank accounts.
