= Boyo, Central African Republic =

Boyo
- Location in Central African Republic
- Coordinates: 5.7258°N 21.4857°E
- Country: Central African Republic
- Prefecture: Ouaka
- Sub-prefecture: Bambari
- Commune: Haute–Baïdou

Boyo is a village located in the Central African Republic prefecture of Ouaka.

== History ==
On 15 May 2021 Russian mercenaries from Wagner Group took control of Boyo after clashes with UPC rebels, during which around 20 people were killed. UPC militiamen recaptured the village on 12 June.

On 6 and 7 December militiamen belonging to the pro-government faction of Anti-balaka attacked Boyo killing around 15 civilians and displacing more than 1,000 people. On 25 December MINUSCA peacekeepers launched an operation in Boyo, forcing around 200 UPC fighters to withdraw. On 6 January 2022 Deputy Special Representative of the Secretary General of the United Nations and Humanitarian Coordinator, Denise Brown accompanied by the humanitarian community went on a mission in Boyo. She met with victims of violence in the community. They said that armed men stole seeds and farming equipment from them, making it harder for civilians to grow crops.
