= Battle of Bakouma =

- Part of the Central African Republic Civil War
Date	31 December 2018 – 16 January 2019
Location	Bakouma, Central African Republic
Result	MINUSCA/FACA victory

Belligerents
Popular Front for the Rebirth of Central African Republic (FPRC) Union for Peace in the Central African Republic (UPC) (alleged)	(Central African Republic) Central African Armed Forces (United Nations) MINUSCA; Anti-balaka

Commanders and leaders
Noureddine Adam; Faris Youssouf Ben Barka; Hissein Damboucha; Mahmat Saleh	Ferdinand Madambari †; Herve Madambari †

Casualties and losses
- 32 people killed, 12,000 displaced

From December 2018 to January 2019 heavy clashes took place in Bakouma in Central African Republic.

== Battle ==
On 31 December 2018 FPRC and UPC rebels took control of Bakouma city after battle with Anti-balaka. They cut telephone networks and looted more than 90% of houses. They killed Madambari brothers, local Anti-balaka leaders. On 2 January 2019 MINUSCA forces entered town demanding withdrawal of militias. More than 12,000 people had to leave city to local forests and roads without any shelters. On 8 January 100 people in Bangassou protested against violence in Bakouma. On 16 January 2019 MINUSCA forces recaptured entire town with support of military and Anti-balaka militias forcing FPRC fighters to leave. They established temporary base in city to protect civilians. The last convoy left town at 5 am. On their withdrawal, FPRC fighters set fire to 40 houses.
