= Doukouma =

- Location in Central African Republic
- Coordinates: 6°42′16″N 19°22′26″E
- Country: Central African Republic
- Prefecture: Nana-Grebizi
- Sub-prefecture: Kaga Bandoro
- Commune: Ndenga

Doukouma is a village situated 40 km from Kaga Bandoro in Nana-Grebizi Prefecture, Central African Republic.

== History ==
In December 2015, Gauthier's Anti-balaka controlled Doukouma. On 22 June 2018, the village self-defense group erected barricades to prevent Pakistan MINUSCA contingent to reach Mbrès due to the accusation of assisting Seleka.

== Education ==
Doukouma has one school.

== Healthcare ==
There is a health post in the village.
