= 2018 Alindao massacre =

- Part of the Central African Republic Civil War
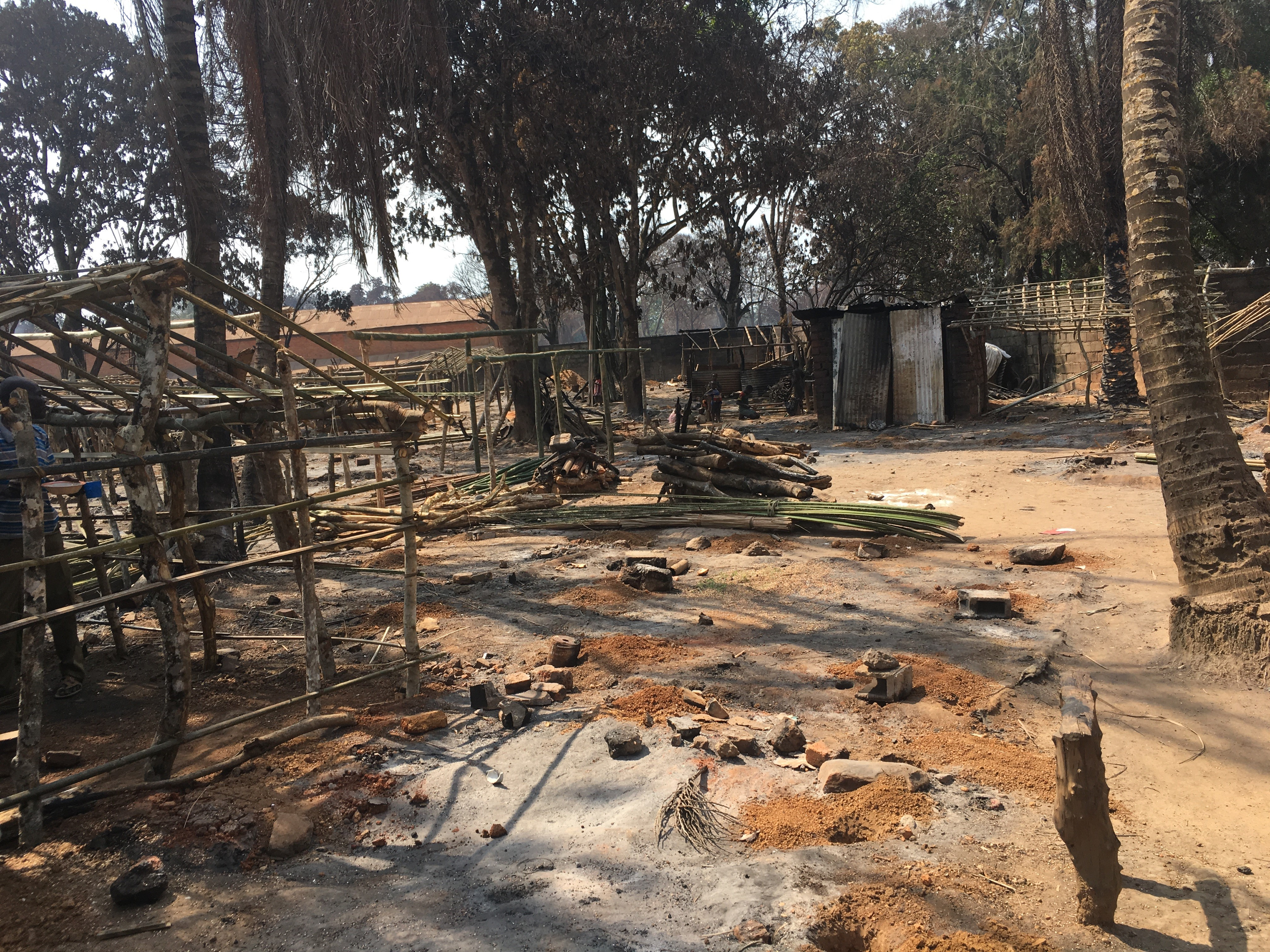
- Burnt market in Alindao after massacre
Date	15 November 2018
Location	Alindao, Basse-Kotto, Central African Republic 5.0404°N 21.2095°E

Belligerents
Union for Peace in the Central African Republic; Armed Muslim civilians	Anti-balaka

Commanders and leaders
Idriss Ibrahim Khalil; Hassan Bouba	Dago

Strength
200–400	c. 12

Casualties and losses
- 112 people killed and 27 injured 17,732 people displaced
- Location within Central African Republic

On 15 November 2018 at least 112 people including 19 children, 44 women and 49 men were killed in attacks on refugee camps in Alindao by UPC and Anti-balaka fighters. At least 27 people were injured including four children.

== Events ==
=== Background ===
On 14 November six suspected Anti-balaka fighters killed a 50-year-old Muslim farmer 1 km from Alindao. The following morning, two suspected Anti-balaka fighters killed two people driving a motorbike. Members of Muslim community in Alindao accused Christian population of Alindao, including residents of IDP camps of providing support to Anti-balaka fighters.

=== Massacre ===
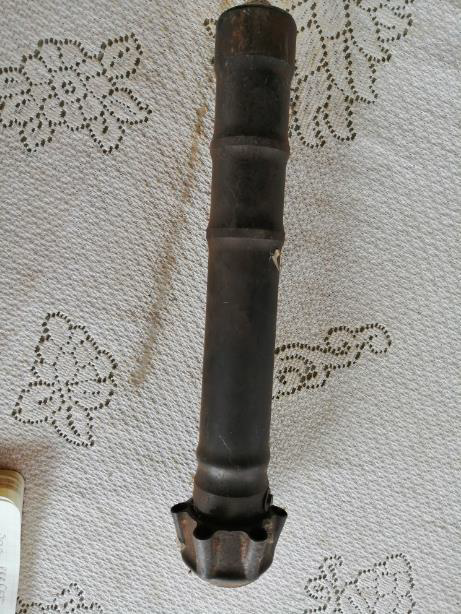
Picture of a rocket-propelled grenade (RPG) remnant found by a witness after the attack by UPC on the IDP site in Alindao

On 15 November around 8:00 local Muslims supported by armed UPC fighters began entering IDP site from the north-west, mostly on foot and with vehicles. Between 200 and 400 armed attackers included besides UPC fighters local militia called "mujahedin" consisting of Alindao's Muslim youth. Around 12 Anti-balaka fighters armed with home-made firearms managed to resist the attack until they ran out of ammunition and were forces to withdraw by 10:00 hour allowing attackers to overrun the camp.

At the beginning of the attack 35 MINUSCA soldiers were present at the site in base located at the center of the camp as well as four security outposts. However they did not engage the attackers and simply withdrew to their base.

First wave of attackers consisting mostly of UPC fighters began firing indiscriminately with assault rifles at civilians. Second group consisting of Muslim civilians started looting displaced people's property as well as local NGO and church's property. In the late afternoon third wave of attackers consisting of UPC fighters from Bokolobo set fire to the camp. By 16:00 attackers withdrew from the camp allowing Anti-balaka fighters to return upon which they looted remaining items from the camp.

Two Catholic priests, Prospère Blaise Mada and Célestin Ngoumbango were murdered. While it is unknown whether they were targeted intentionally, they were wearing cassocks while being killed.

On 16 and 17 November CAR Red Cross workers buried 68 bodies in 20 mass graves and two smaller individual graves.

=== Theft ===
During the massacre attackers looted private and church's belongings and destroyed or stole humanitarian aid including food, money, vehicles, equipment and written record of educational, humanitarian and medical institutions. Several brick buildings were destroyed or vandalized including part of the cathedral and at least half of the IDP site. Some of attackers later transported looted property using vehicles.

=== Displacement ===
Almost entire camp's population of 17,732 people were forced to flee to local MINUSCA base and into bush around Alindao where they had to remain for several days suffering from hunger, thirst and lack of shelter and medical care. Most people returned to the camp and started rebuilding their homes following increase in MINUSCA peacekeepers presence.

=== Attacks on religious and humanitarian sites ===
During the attacks at least six NGOs and one UN agency were targeted. Attackers accused them of supporting Anti-balaka and favoring Christian residents. Attackers stole at least two NGO vehicles as well as three motorbikes. UPC fighters warned local NGO staff not to provide medical care to injured people.

== Aftermath ==
On 21 December 2021 UPC general Idriss Ibrahim Khalil alias Bin Laden and Anti-balaka general Dago who were responsible for the massacre surrendered to the government in Alindao. They however have not yet been charged or arrested for their crimes. On 23 July 2022 general "Bin Laden" was arrested and transferred to Bangui.

Another UPC general who was reportedly responsible for the massacre, Hassan Bouba, was nominated as a minister of livestock in the Touadera government. While he was arrested in November 2021 he was released shortly after.
