= Nzacko =

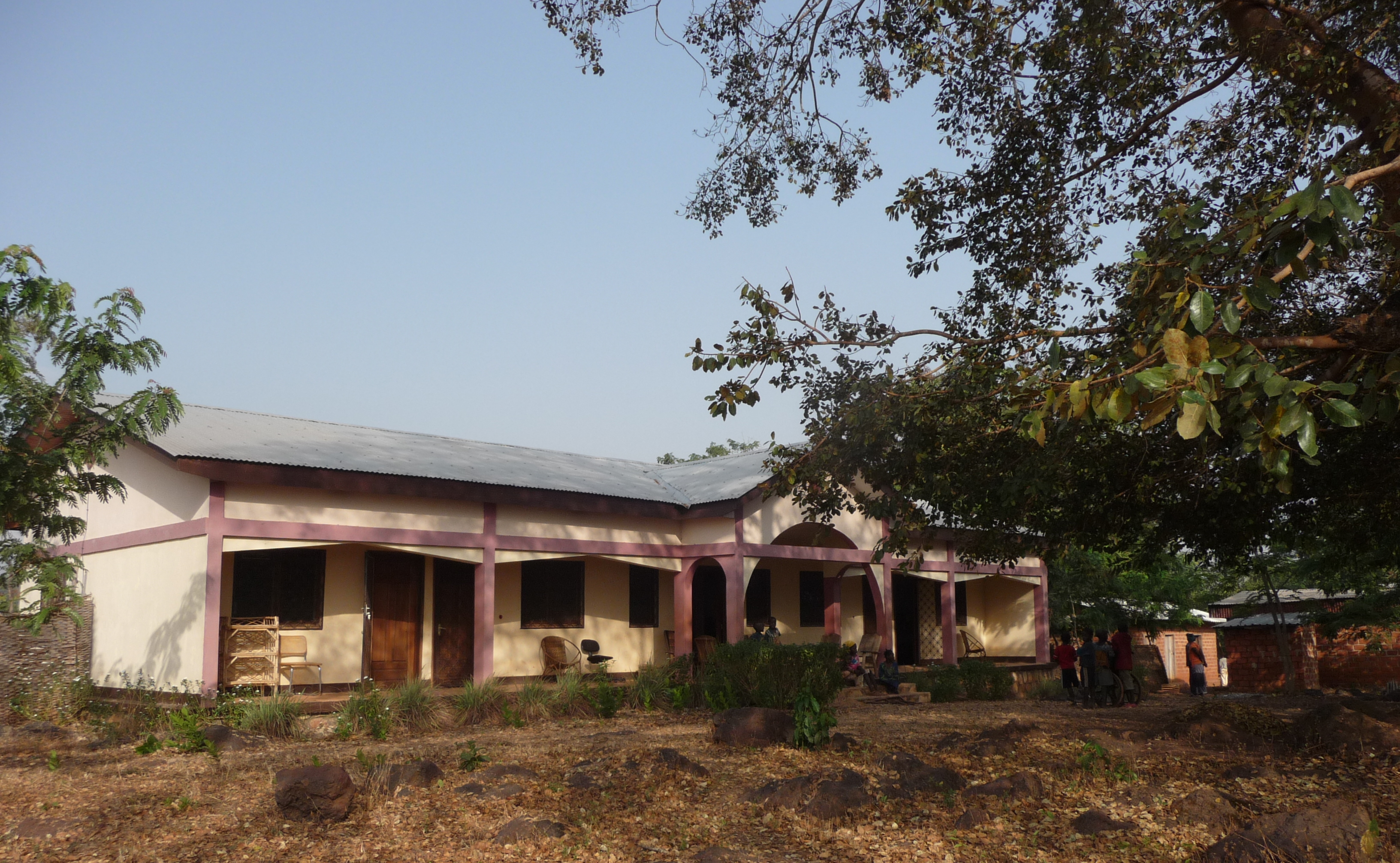
- Catholic mission in Nzacko

- Location in Central African Republic
- Coordinates: 6°07′33″N 22°51′40″E
- Country: Central African Republic
- Prefecture: Mbomou
- Sub-prefecture: Bakouma
- Commune: Bakouma

Nzacko or Nzako is a village located in the Central African Republic prefecture of Mbomou on the road between Bakouma and Bria.

Artisanal diamond mining is active in the commune.

== History ==
On 9 February 2010, LRA raided Nzacko. They killed two people and kidnapped around 40.

In July 2014 Séléka militiamen clashed with Ugandan forces resulting in deaths of over dozen of Selekans and several Ugandan troops.

Between 20 and 24 March 2017 FPRC and Anti-balaka took control of Nzacko after expelling UPC fighters. On 6 June at least 18 civilians were killed after FPRC attacked Anti-balaka positions in the town. On 11 June 2017 FPRC took control of Nzacko.

On 27 April 2021 the town was captured by Russian mercenaries. On 8 December 2021 armed forces withdrew from Nzacko and week later rebels from FPRC recaptured the village. On 5 March 2022 Russian mercenaries captured Nzacko village clashing with FPRC rebels. 2 Russians and 5 rebels were killed. On 8 March 2022 rebels again took control of Nzacko and on 27 March armed forces again recaptured it.

CPC rebels stormed the FACA position in the town on 1 June 2024. The attack was repelled by FACA, in which 12 rebels were killed.
