= Rodrigue Ngaibona =

Central African militant

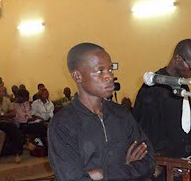
- Rodrigue Ngaibona on trial in January 2018
- Born: 1986 or 1987 (age 38–39)
- Other name: Andjilo
- Convictions: Murder; Criminal conspiracy; Armed robbery; Kidnapping; Illegal possession of firearms and munitions of war
- Penalty: Life imprisonment

Details
- Date apprehended: 17 January 2015
- Military career
- Allegiance: Anti-balaka
- Service years: 2013 – 2015

Rodrigue Ngaibona alias Andjilo is a former Anti-balaka leader in the Central African Republic, arrested in 2015 and convicted 2018 for his crimes during the civil war.

== Life ==
In 2012 he was reportedly 25 years old. He was a robber and cattle thief in the Batangafo region. He used to live in a village between Batangafo and Bouca. When it was attacked by Séléka he joined Anti-balaka retaking control of it. On 5 December 2013 he participated in attack on Bangui as an Anti-balaka colonel, leading a group of around 300 fighters. In April 2014 he defeated ex-Seleka forces of Mahamat Al-Khatim in Bouca.

In May 2014, an arrest warrant was issued against him. In July and August 2014 his forces clashed with ex-Seleka fighters in Batangafo. In August 2014 he moved to Bangui where he clashed with another faction of Anti-balaka in the 4th district. His men are suspected of the October 2014 attack on a MINUSCA convoy during which one peacekeeper was killed. During the war his fighter had raped multiple women with Ngaibona himself keeping one as a sexual slave for nearly seven months.

On 17 January 2015 he was arrested by MINUSCA peacekeepers in Bouca. He was transferred to Bangui. On 19 January, fighters of his brother, Dieudonné Ngaïbona, kidnapped two people demanding his release. They were eventually released. On 25 January 2015 Armel Sayo was kidnapped by his brother, again demanding Rodrigue's freedom. He was released following order of an Anti-balaka chief. On 22 January 2018 he was convicted by a special court of multiple murders, criminal conspiracy, armed robbery, kidnapping and illegal possession of firearms and munitions of war. He was sentenced to life imprisonment with hard labor. He was also ordered to pay 138,000,000 CFA francs to victims of his crimes and one franc to human rights defenders. On 1 August 2022 he was, according to Corbeau News Centrafrique, released from prison and sent to Berengo camp to join the armed forces. In December he was reportedly sent to Burkina Faso or Ukraine by the Wagner Group.

== Family ==
His uncle, Dieudonné Ndomaté and his brother Dieudonné Ngaïbona are also Anti-balaka leaders.
