= Mbiti =

- Location in Central African Republic
- Coordinates: 6°33′45″N 19°6′23″E
- Country: Central African Republic
- Prefecture: Nana-Grebizi
- Sub-prefecture: Kaga Bandoro
- Commune: Ndenga

Population (2018)
  - Total: 1,630

Mbiti is a village situated in Nana-Grebizi Prefecture, Central African Republic.

== History ==
Presidential Guard and FACA burned houses in Mbiti in mid-December 2006. Some families left Mbiti for Dekoa in November 2016 due to the 12th October violence in Kaga Bandoro. In June 2017, Gustave Imguissa's Anti-balaka controlled Mbiti.

== Education ==
There is a school in the village.

== Healthcare ==
Mbiti has one health post that covers the surrounding villages of Sabayanga, Kanda, and Somboke.

== Bibliography ==
- Solidarités international; UNICEF (17 March 2018). Mécanisme de Réponse Rapide (RRM) Rapport d’Intervention A.M.E / EHA - Réponse aux flambées de diarrhées sanglantes, Commune Ndenga, Sous-Préfecture Kaga-Bandoro (Du 01 au 17 mars 2018) (PDF) (Report).
