= Blakadja =

- Location in Central African Republic
- Coordinates: 6°40′34″N 19°37′1″E
- Country: Central African Republic
- Prefecture: Nana-Grebizi
- Sub-prefecture: Mbrès
- Commune: Mbrès

Blakadja, often written Blagadja, is a village situated 20 km from Mbrès in Nana-Grebizi Prefecture, Central African Republic.

== History ==
In August 2015, Blakadja was under control of Franco Yagbegue's Anti-Balaka. A clash between two warring armed groups occurred in Blakadja in June 2018. Wagner forces attacked UPC post in the village on 4 November 2022.

== Education ==
There is a school in the village. In 2018, the school was damaged due to the fighting between two militias.

== Healthcare ==
The village has one health post. In January 2015, the health post did not have staff because of the ongoing war and was guarded by Anti-balaka personnel. The health post suffered from looting due to the June 2018 attack.

== Bibliography ==
- HRW, HRW (5 October 2017). “They Said We Are Their Slaves”: Sexual Violence by Armed Groups in the Central African Republic (PDF) (Report). Human Rights Watch.
