= Maxime Mokom =

Central African militant (born 1978)

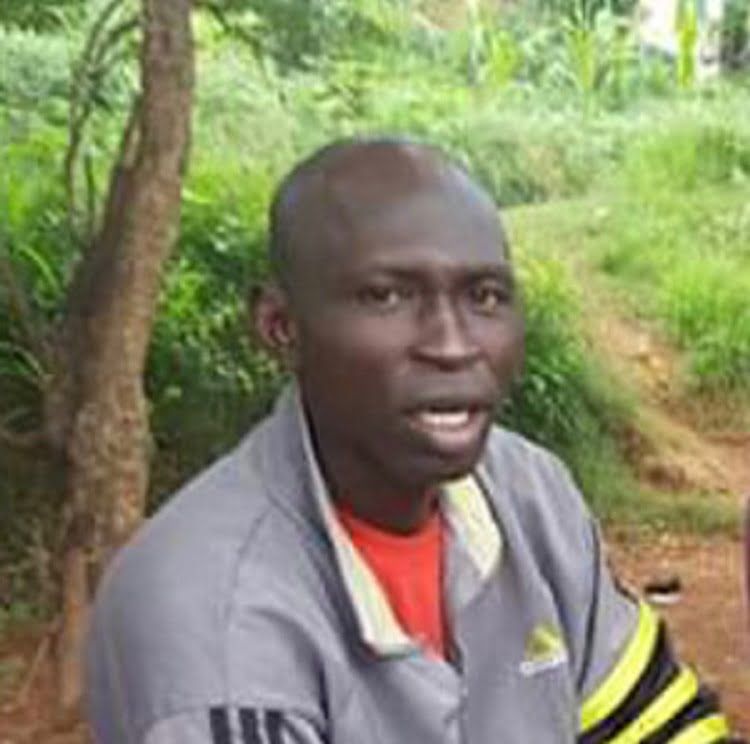
- Mokom in 2016

Minister of Disarmament
- In office 2018–2020

Leader of Anti-balaka (Mokom branch)
- In office December 2013 – March 2022
- Succeeded by: Bernard Bonda

Personal details
- Born: 30 December 1978 (age 47) Bangui

Maxime Jeoffroy Eli Mokom Gawaka (born 30 December 1978) is a former minister of disarmament in the Central African Republic, and leader of Anti-balaka. He was arrested in 2022 and charged with war crimes, but the case was dropped the following year.

== Biography ==
Mokom was born on 30 December 1978. In 2013, he was one of the co-founders of militant movement Anti-balaka. From 2013 to 2014, he committed multiple war crimes. On 10 December 2018, he was publicly indicted by International Criminal Court for murder, extermination, deportation or forcible transfer and displacement of civilian population, imprisonment or other severe deprivation of physical liberty, torture, persecution, enforced disappearance of persons, mutilation, intentionally directing attacks against the civilian population, intentionally directing attacks against buildings dedicated to religion, pillaging, enlistment of children under age 15 and destruction of the adversary’s property.

On 15 December 2020, he joined Coalition of Patriots for Change led by former president François Bozizé. He ordered Anti-balaka fighters to attack Bangui in January 2021. In July 2021, he fled to N'Djamena in Chad. On 14 March 2022, he was surrendered to the International Criminal Court (ICC) by Chadian authorities and transferred to The Hague.

On 21 September 2023, the Bangui Court of Appeal sentenced Mokom, alongside Bozizé, his sons Jean-Francis and Aimé-Vincent, and other rebel leaders, to life imprisonment in absentia.

On 19 October 2023, the ICC announced the release of Mokom due to the dropping of charges by the prosecution, justified by the unavailability of witnesses. Mokom was accused of crimes against humanity and war crimes committed in 2013 and 2014 in the Central African Republic.

== Family ==
He is an older brother of Aaron Wilibona and allegedly a nephew of former president François Bozizé.
