= Gadoulou =

Village in Lim-Pendé, Central African Republic

- Location in Central African Republic
- Coordinates: 7°13′56″N 16°30′25″E
- Country: Central African Republic
- Prefecture: Lim-Pendé
- Sub-prefecture: Paoua
- Commune: Paoua

Gadoulou is a village situated in Lim-Pendé Prefecture, Central African Republic.

== History ==
In June 2014, RJ controlled Gadoulou. RJ clashed with MISCA forces in the village on 14 August, killing the militia's commander, “Waluba”, and injuring his deputies and two rebels. In January 2018, MNLC militia commanded by Ahmat Bahar seized the village. It caused the villagers to flee to Paoua and they only returned when MINUSCA drove the rebels away from the village. MPC claimed that they captured Gadoulou on 17 May 2018.

== Education ==
Gadoulou has one school.

== Bibliography ==
- UN Security Council (29 October 2014). Letter dated 28 October 2014 from the Panel of Experts on the Central African Republic established pursuant to Security Council resolution 2127 (2013) addressed to the President of the Security Council (PDF) (Report).
