= Bangassou massacre =

Massacre in the Central African Republic

- Part of the Central African Republic Civil War
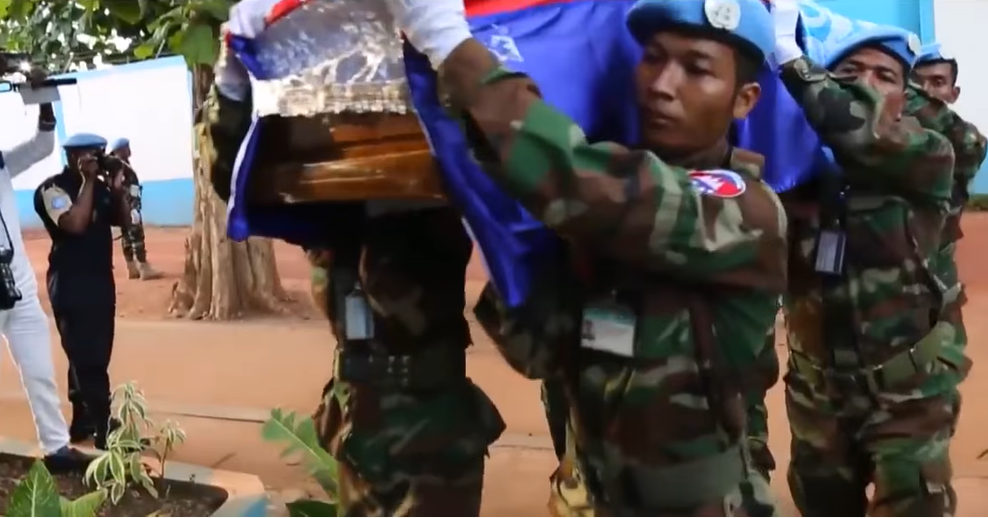
- Funeral service of Cambodian peacekeeper killed by Anti-balaka
Date	13 – 15 May 2017
Location	Bangassou, Mbomou, Central African Republic 4°44′N 23°49′E
Result	MINUSCA victory

Belligerents
MINUSCA	Anti-balaka

Commanders and leaders
	Kevin Bere Bere; Romaric Mandago; Crépin Wakanam; Patrick Gbiako; Yembeline Mbenguia Alpha

Strength
	600–700

Casualties and losses
(United Nations) 1 killed, 25 injured	Unknown
- 115+ people killed 3,000 people displaced
- Location within Central African Republic

During May 2017, a massacre occurred in the Central African Republic town of Bangassou after Anti-balaka militias launched an attack in the area.

== History ==
On 13 May 2017 around 600 to 700 Anti-balaka fighters entered Bangassou, attacking a MINUSCA base and a Muslim Tokoyo neighborhood. They started pillaging the city and attacking Muslim residents. More than 3,000 people escaped their homes seeking refugee in a hospital, cathedral and mosque. Anti-balaka besieged mosque sheltering more than 1,000 people. On 15 May MINUSCA forces managed to recapture key points in the city freeing hostages from mosque. In the following days more than 115 bodies were found in the city. One MINUSCA peacekeeper from Morocco was also killed.

== Responsibility ==
On 7 February 2020, two and a half years after the clashes in Bangassou, five Anti-Balaka commanders and 23 militiamen were sentenced for years in prison. They were found guilty of criminal conspiracy, illegal possession of firearms and murder.
