= Bossemptélé =

- sub-prefectures
- Location in Central African Republic
- Country: Central African Republic

Government
  - Sub-Prefect: Jean Loïc Yanikouzou

Bossemptélé is a sub-prefecture of Ouham-Pendé in the Central African Republic.

== Geography ==
Bossemptélé is on the RN3 road 369 kilometres (229 mi) northwest of Bangui and 87 kilometres (54 mi) south of Bozoum, bordering the prefectures of Ombella-M'Poko and Nana-Mambéré. is at the crossroads of the RN3 on the Bangui – Garoua-Boulaï axis, part of the Douala Bangui Corridor and the RR6 regional road connecting Bozoum.

== Administration ==
The municipality of Binon is the only commune of the sub-prefecture. In 2003, it had 18,024 inhabitants.

== Civil war ==
On 18 January 2014 Anti-balaka militias murdered more than 100 people in Bossemptélé. On 1 March 2014 African peacekeepers evacuated 190 people from Bossemptélé, but 65 people were left behind including women, children and people with disabilities who were unable to climb onto the trucks. In April French forces came to the town and Anti-balaka fighters dismantled their checkpoints and returned to local villages. On 19 December 2020 MINUSCA forces were deployed in Bossemptélé after it was captured by CPC rebels. On 8 February 2021 the town was recaptured by government forces.
