= Hassan Bouba =

Central African politician

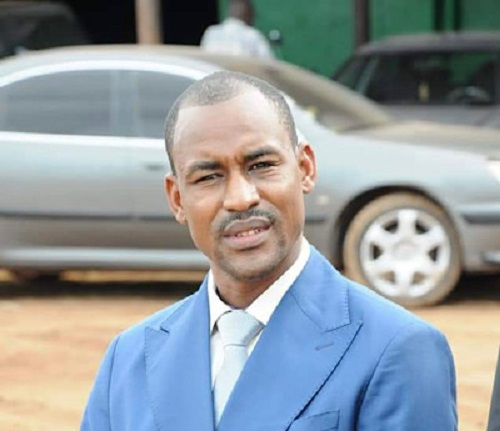
- Photographed in Boali in September 2021

Minister of Urban Planning, Land Reform, Cities, and Housing
- Incumbent
- Assumed office 21 May 2026
- President: Faustin-Archange Touadéra
- Prime Minister: Henri-Marie Dondra; Félix Moloua
- Preceded by: Nicele Nkoué

Minister of Livestock and Animal Health
- In office 3 December 2020 – 21 May 2026
- President: Faustin-Archange Touadéra
- Prime Minister: Henri-Marie Dondra; Félix Moloua
- Preceded by: Amadou Bi Aliou
- Succeeded by: Amadou Bi Aliou

Personal details
- Born: Chad

Hassan Bouba is a minister of livestock and animal health in the Central African Republic and general of the Union for Peace in the Central African Republic armed group.

== Life ==
He used to work for Chadian intelligence. In 2010 he contacted with Baba Laddé, leader of Central African Republic rebel group Popular Front for Recovery. After fall of François Bozizé he joined Central African rebels.

In 2016 he became a political coordination of the Union for Peace in the Central African Republic. In 2017 he allegedly ordered murder of four child soldiers from UPC armed group. He also participated in the 2018 Alindao massacre. On 3 December 2020 he was appointed minister of livestock by president Touadera. In September 2021 he reportedly created splinter faction from UPC.

On 19 November 2021 he was arrested. Country's Special Criminal Court charged him with war crimes stemming from a 2018 massacre of 112 civilians. The government released him on 26 November.

Moloua appointed Bouba as Minister of Urban Planning, Land Reform, Cities, and Housing on 21 May 2026.
