= Satema =

Coordinates: 4°18′N 21°41′E

- sub-prefectures
- Location in Central African Republic
- Country: Central African Republic

Government
  - Sub-Prefect: Benjamin Imbi

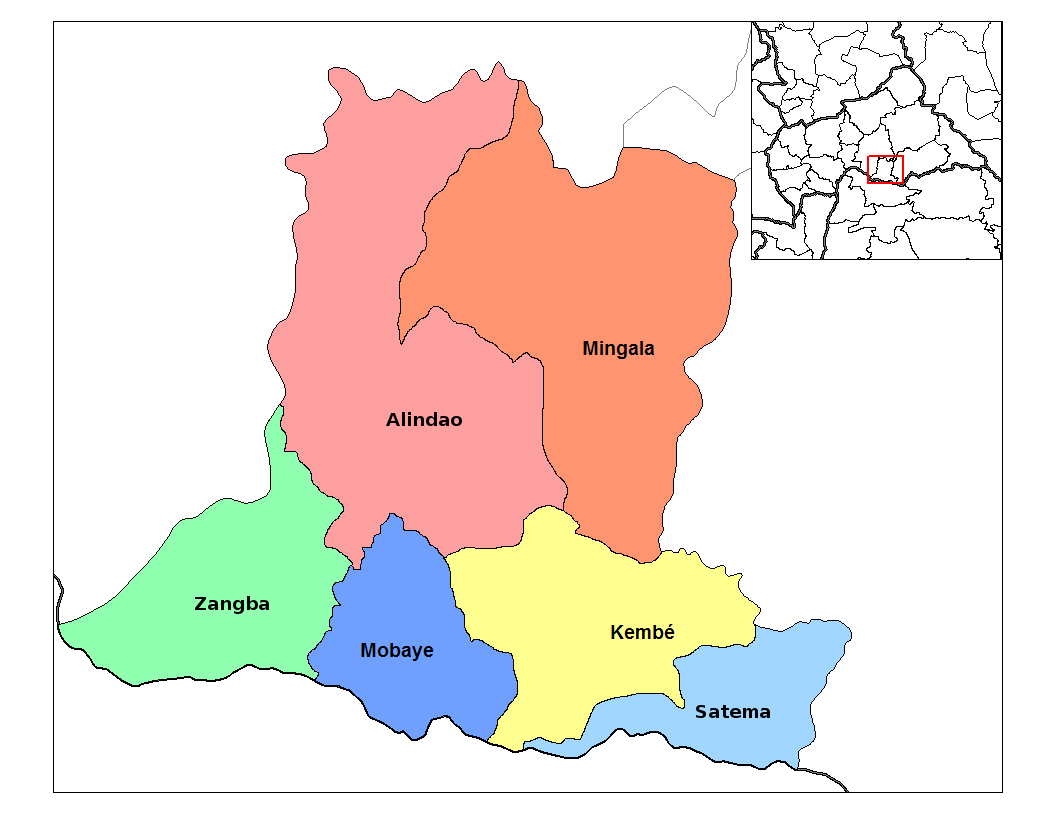
Map of the sub-prefectures of Basse-Kotto prefecture in the Central African Republic.

Satema is a sub-prefecture of Basse-Kotto in the Central African Republic.

== Geography ==
The city is located on the right bank and facing the rapids of the Ubangi River, which is the border with Congo DRC. Towards the North, a rural track connects the locality with the RN2 national road at the locality of Dimbi.

== History ==
On August 15, 1891, during the Gaillard expedition, the gunboat Le Ballay sank in the rapids of Satéma. The administrative control point of Satema was created on July 9, 1982 in the municipality of Kotto-Oubangui. In 2002, the locality is erected in sub-prefecture.

=== Civil war ===
In early January 2013, Séléka rebels arrived in Satema following withdrawal of armed forces. They kidnapped a woman and pillaged several buildings including state institutions and the Catholic Church. In November 2016 it was reported that Satema was under the control of the rebel group known as the Union for Peace in the Central African Republic. Since at least 2017, it is under control of anti-balaka militias which reportedly as of 2019 engage in forced marriage, kidnappings and ritual killings in the subprefecture. On 4 April 2021 it was reported that 50 Anti-balaka fighters led by General Ndagou with automatic weapons were based in Satema.

== Economy ==
The sub-prefecture is located in a zone of maize, cassava, peanut and rice food crops. Commercial crops are cotton, tobacco and coffee.
