= Jean-Francis Diandi =

Central African militant

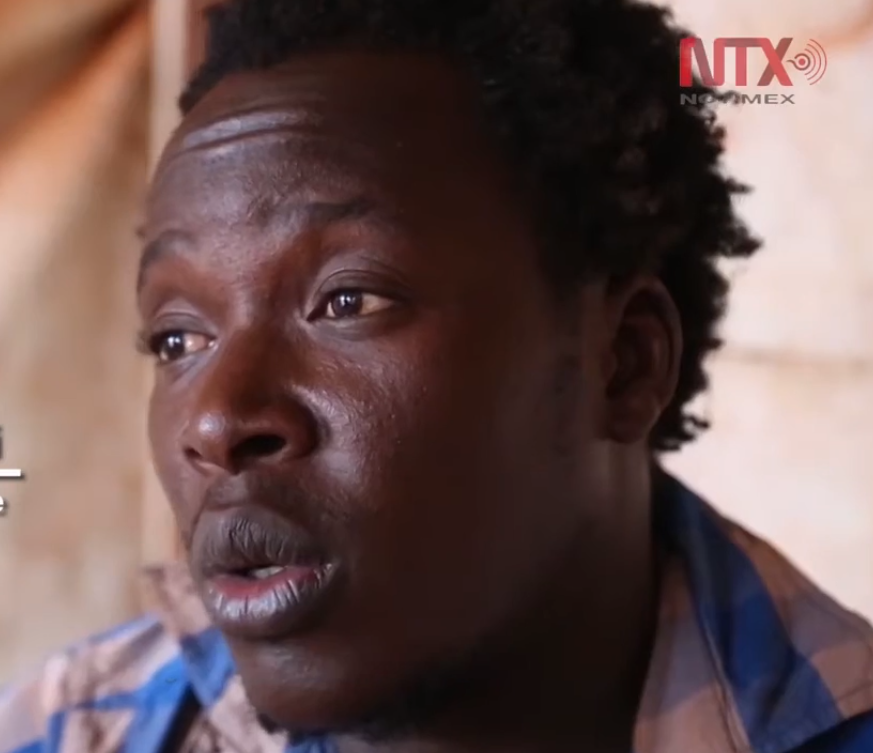
- Jean-Francis Diandi in February 2018
- Born: 1992 or 1993 (age 33–34)
- Other name: Ramazani
- Military career
- Allegiance: Anti-balaka
- Service years: until 2018, since 2020

Jean-Francis Diandi alias Ramazani is an Anti-balaka militia leader from Bria, Central African Republic.

== War ==
He was responsible for killing a Mauritanian peacekeeper on 4 December 2017. He was arrested on 16 March 2018 by peacekeeping forces and sent to Ngaragba Central Prison in Bangui. In December 2020, he was released from prison and joined Coalition of Patriots for Change rebels in Bria.
