= François Toussaint =

Belgian-Congolese mercenary convicted of murder (born 1965)

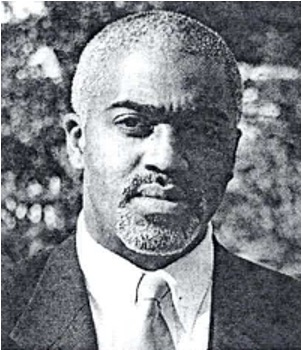
- Born: 6 October 1965 (age 60); Lodja, Democratic Republic of Congo
- Other names: Kalonda Omanyama, David Ngoy
- Military career
- Allegiance: Revolution and Justice
- Service years: 2013 – 2014

François Toussaint (French pronunciation: [fʁɑ̃swa tusɛ̃]), also known as Kalonda Omanyama or David Ngoy, born on 6 October 1965 in Lodja, in the Democratic Republic of Congo, is a Belgian-Congolese mercenary convicted of murder.

== Life ==
Born in DR Congo, his father was a Belgian spy and his mother was Congolese. He was convicted of murder committed in 2005, after which he fled the country, travelling between multiple countries including Burundi, Gabon and Congo. In Congo he was accused of training Mai-Mai militias in South Kivu. In January 2009 he was arrested but promptly released following intervention of human rights organization.

=== Central African Republic ===
In 2013 together with Armel Sayo he created the armed group Revolution and Justice. On 1 November he crossed the border into the country and started a training camp in the outskirts of Paoua. He was in charge of training and military strategy. He left the group on 5 February 2014 following a dispute with Sayo. On 7 July 2014 he was arrested by MISCA in Bouar and transferred to Bangui.

On 15 October 2015 he was sentenced by a Belgian court to 20 years in prison for the 2005 murder of Manuel Maroquin.
