= Dieudonné Ndomaté =

Central African militant

Minister of Arts, Culture and Tourism
- In office 3 March 2019 – 11 May 2021
- President: Faustin-Archange Touadéra
- Prime Minister: Firmin Ngrébada
- Preceded by: Jacob Mokpem Bionli
- Succeeded by: Jennifer Saraiva Yanzere

Leader of Anti-balaka (Ngaïssona branch)
- In office January 2019 – 11 May 2021
- Preceded by: Patrice-Edouard Ngaïssona
- Succeeded by: Igor Lamaka

National coordinator of Anti-balaka
- In office 2013 – January 2019

Personal details
- Born: Batangafo, Central African Republic

Dieudonné Ndomaté is a Central African politician and militant who served as the leader of the Anti-Balaka from 2019 to 2021. He formerly served as Minister of Arts, Culture and Tourism in the Central African Republic from 2019 to 2021.

He was arrested in 2021 for treason and later acquitted.

== Life ==
He is a paternal uncle of Rodrigue Ngaibona alias Andjilo, another Anti-balaka general. From 2004 to 2012 he studied at University of Bangui.

=== Civil war ===
In 2013, Ndomaté joined Anti-balaka. On 5 December 2013, he left Bouca to participate in attack on Bangui. In December 2014, he was a Deputy Chief of Operations of the Anti-balaka of Boy-Rabe neighborhood in Bangui. In 2015, he was National Coordinator in charge of the operations of the former Antibalaka. After transfer of Patrice-Edouard Ngaïssona to the International Criminal Court in January 2019, Dieudonné Ndomaté became de facto leader of the Ngaïssona branch of the Anti-balaka. He was one of the signatories of 2019 peace agreement. On 3 March 2019, president Touadera nominated him as a Minister of Arts, Culture and Tourism.

On 28 March 2020, 16 anti-balaka members were arrested at his residence in police operation. In early April 2020, in a show of protest, he suspended his participation in the government for a few days. In 2020 elections, he was an independent candidate from district Batangafo I. On 15 December 2020, he joined Coalition of Patriots for Change led by former president François Bozizé. On 16 December, he left Bangui towards Batangafo taking with him a few vehicles which he handed over to CPC rebels. On 11 May 2021, he was arrested in Bouca for incitement to insurrection. On 12 May, he was transferred to Bangui and placed under arrest. On 27 May 2022, after two weeks of trials he and 15 other people were acquitted of all charges due to insufficient evidence.

In 2024 he moved to Cameroon where he was arrested by Cameroonian authorities and extradicted to the Central African Republic where he was again placed in a jail in July.
