= Atongo-Bakari =

- Location in Central African Republic
- Coordinates: 5°48′49″N 21°35′17″E
- Country: Central African Republic
- Prefecture: Ouaka
- Sub-prefecture: Ippy
- Commune: Yéngou

Atongo-Bakari, also written Atongo-Bakary, is a village situated in Ouaka Prefecture, Central African Republic.

== History ==
Anti-balaka and FPRC attacked Atongo-Bakari on 2 December 2016, killing 18 Peuhl civilians, including the leader of the nomadic camp and his deputy. The same group stormed the village on 9 December, killing four people.

Around 20 UPC militias attacked Atongo-Bakari on 13 March 2017, killing nine civilians and burning almost all houses in the village. Due to the attack, the residents fled from the village.

In May 2021, Atongo-Bakari was under CPC's control, causing the election not to be held in the village. Ex-Séléka members entered the village on 1 February 2022, killing three people and torching houses. As a result, the residents sought refuge in the bush.

== Healthcare ==
There is a health center in the village.
