= Mahamet Saleh (warlord) =

Central African warlord

Mahamet Saleh Adoum Kette
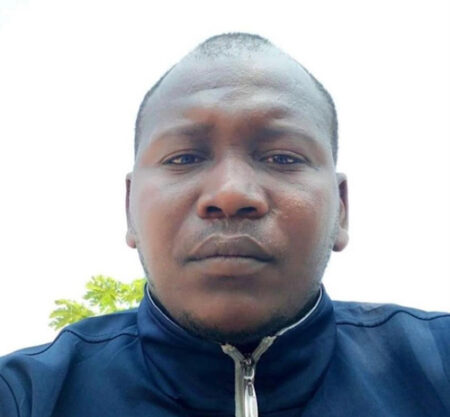

FPRC general
- Incumbent
- Assumed office 2011

Personal details
- Born: Nzacko, Mbomou
- Spouse: Saloua

Mahamat Saleh Adoum Kette is a Central African warlord, and a general in the rebel group Popular Front for the Rebirth of Central African Republic (FPRC). He is responsible for multiple war crimes including murder, rape, forced marriage, torture and looting.

== Life ==
=== Early life ===
He is a son of Abba Adoum Kette, an influential diamond collector from Bria, and allegedly a brother of Abdoulaye Hissène. Born in Nzacko in Mbomou prefecture, he was formerly an artisan miner and diamond collector.

=== Central African Republic Bush War ===
During the Central African Republic Bush War he led faction of Convention of Patriots for Justice and Peace (CPJP) based in Nzacko. He commanded around 500 men. On 13 August 2011 he arrived in Bangui as representative of CPJP to negotiate peace. On 3 February 2012 his fighters attacked Nzacko clashing with armed forces.

=== Central African Republic Civil War (2012–present) ===
During Séléka occupation of Bangui in 2013 Mahamat Saleh was overseeing CEDAD compound under command of Mahamat Said, where there were reports of torture and disappearances. He was arresting perceived Bozizé's supporters in the city. He was Noureddine Adam's chief of security and member of his cabinet. In 2015 he attended Nairobi talks as a FPRC representative. In December 2016 he clashed in Nzacko with UPC fighters. He participated in occupation of Bakouma from December 2019 to January 2020. On 3 February 2020 he shot at group of Goula people in Nzacko killing three of them. He also held at gunpoint group of Goula women, raping two underage girls. In August 2020 his fighters expelled officials responsible for voting registration from Yalinga and Nzacko.

In December 2020 he joined Coalition of Patriots for Change. He order his fighters to seize Bakouma in late December. On 3 January 2021 his fighters occupied Bangassou where they engaged in widespread looting and taxation of population. On 17 January he withdrew from Bangassou towards Niakari where his fighters reportedly engaged in forced marriage of a minor. On 18 January his fighters fired at UN forces at Mbari bridge killing two peacekeeper. He again clashed with them on 19 and 30 January. On 20 February he withdrew from Niakari and moved between Yalinga and Nzacko. In May his forces were reportedly present in Gbogbo village on Yalinga axis engaging in widespread looting of the population. On 24 June he arrived at Sans-Souci village near Bria where his fighters were ambushed by Russian mercenaries. He managed to flee via river. On 14 January 2022 his fighters raped 16 underage girls in Nzacko. On 8 March 2022 his forces returned to Nzacko after Russians left the town. On 21 May his forces attacked Nzacko killing 11 soldiers. From 8 to 9 December his forces clashed with Russian mercenaries in Akocho site north of Bria with 50 people killed on both sides.

The UK government imposed sanctions on Mahamat Saleh for overseeing "rape and other forms of sexual and gender-based violence" on 8 March 2023.

On 12 May 2023, he left the CPC due to the lack of trust and the absence of loyalty, clarity, and transparency within the group.
