= Zangba =

Coordinates: 4°27′N 20°59′E

- sub-prefectures
- Location in Central African Republic
- Country: Central African Republic

Government
  - Sub-Prefect: Serge Fortune Badela

Zangba is a sub-prefecture of Basse-Kotto in the Central African Republic.

== Geography ==
The locality is located on the right bank of the Ubangi River which is the border with Congo DRC.

== History ==
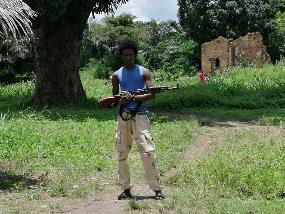
UPC fighter in Zangba, September 2019

As of May 2021 Zangba remains under control of Union for Peace in the Central African Republic rebel group. On 20 July 2024 Zangba was recaptured by the armed forces.

== Administration ==
The sub-prefecture of Zangba is made up of the two communes of Ouambé and Yabongo.
