= Anti-balaka =

Christian militias in the Central African Republic

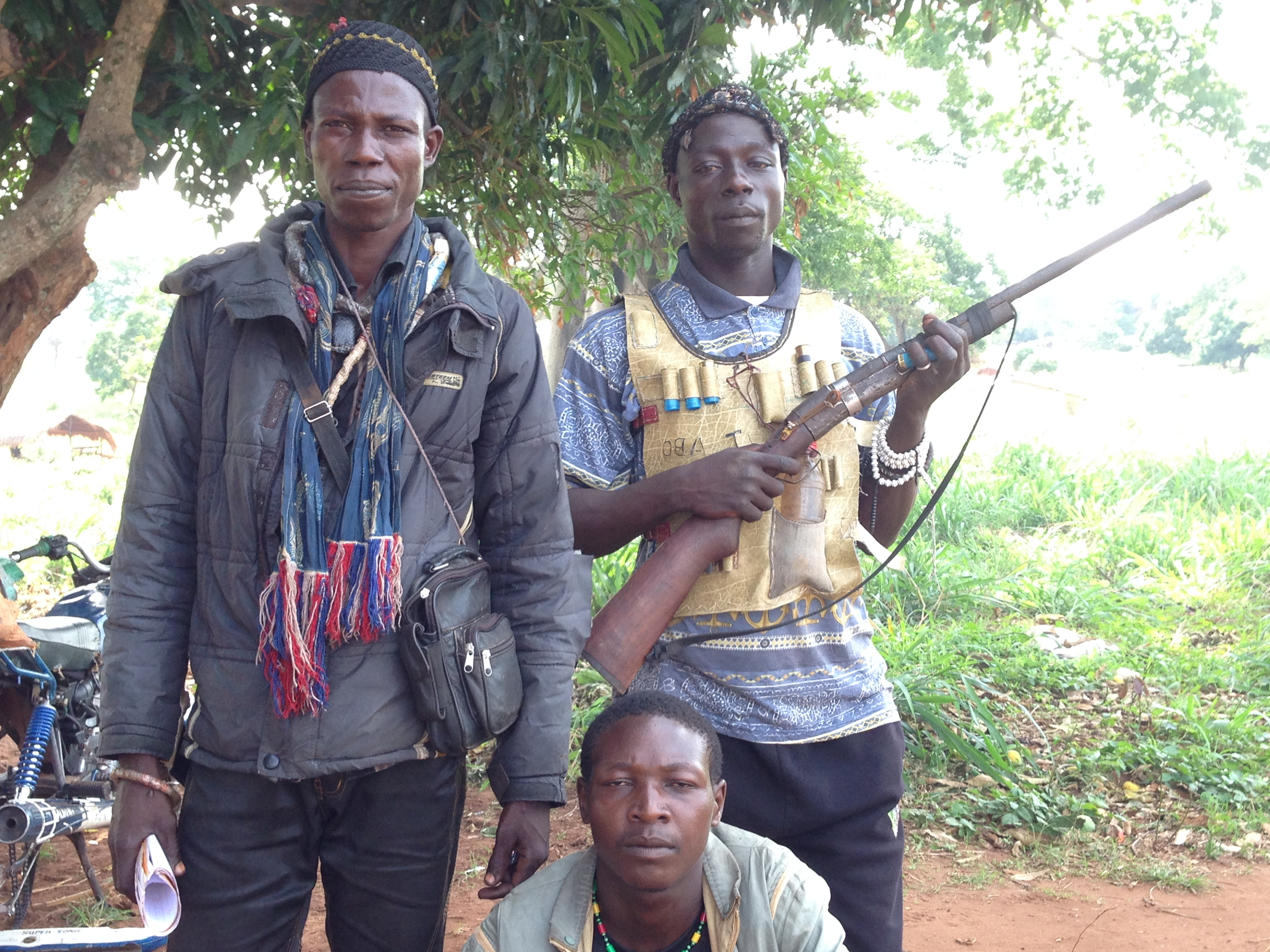
- Anti-balaka militia in Gbaguili, a village located 340 km from Bangui
- Leaders: Bernard Bonda (Mokom branch); Igor Lamaka (Ngaïssona branch); Maxime Mokom (surrendered); Dieudonné Ndomaté (surrendered); Levy Yakete †; Patrice Edouard Ngaissona (surrendered); See full list
- Dates active: 2013–present
- Headquarters: Bossangoa (until 2021); N'Djamena, Chad (since 2021)
- Active regions: Central African Republic
- Part of: Coalition of Patriots for Change (since 2020)

The Anti-balaka is an alliance of militia groups based in the Central African Republic that are fighting in the Central African Republic Civil War since 2012. It is primarily of Christians. The Tony Blair Faith Foundation and journalist Andrew Katz have noted that animists also participate in Anti-balaka groups.

Anti-balaka formed in the Central African Republic after the rise to power of Michel Djotodia in 2013. Amnesty International reported in 2015 that some members of anti-balaka groups had forcibly converted Muslims to Christianity. Anti-balaka leaders have also been present at torture sessions of people accused of being witches in public ceremonies, and the Anti-balaka have been accused of extorting money with witchcraft accusations, according to an internal UN report.

== Terminology ==
A proposed origin for "anti-Balaka" is as claimed:

[It is] from the language of the young illiterates, who formed Seleka's armed opposition, and who chased the Muslim 'anti-balles à ti laka' (anti ti laka bullets). The term 'laka' in the street language of the Central African Republic means an AK-47. The anti-balakas are therefore the bearers of grigris meant to stop Kalashnikov bullets.

== UN Congolese peace-keepers' murder and torture of Anti-balaka ==
According to Human Rights Watch, Congolese peacekeeping forces operating under the auspices of the UN murdered a number of Anti-balaka, including a mass murder of 12 people, and tortured others.

== History ==
Some commentators have said that village militias formed in the 1990s to protect against highwaymen were a precursor to the Antibalaka. Unable to provide security throughout the remote areas of the country, President François Bozizé organized, self-protection groups in 2009 to combat crime on the village level; these took the name Antibalaka.

In March 2013, Bozizé (a Christian) was overthrown by a coup during the Central African Republic Civil War by a mostly Muslim rebel coalition known as Séléka. The leader of the Séléka, Michel Djotodia, became the first Muslim president of the country. With the disbanding of the army by Djotodia, many army members joined the militia, boosting their numbers and helping train them.

Djotodia announced the dissolution of the Séléka in September 2013, but most of the militias refused to disband. The Séléka and the anti-balaka engaged in a cycle of increasing violence.

As many Christians had more settled lifestyles and many Muslims were nomadic, competing claims to the land were another dimension of the tensions. In November 2013, the UN warned that the country was at risk of spiraling into genocide, and was "descending into complete chaos". France described the country as "... on the verge of genocide". On 2 December 2013, anti-balaka militiamen were suspected to have killed 12 people, including children, and wounded 30 others in an attack on the mostly-Muslim Fula in Boali, according to the government. This was amidst the Central African Republic conflict under the Djotodia administration.

Territories under control of Anti-balaka in 2014

Early 2014 marked a turning point; hardened by war and massacres, the anti-balaka committed multiple atrocities. In December 2013, UNICEF reported that in sectarian violence in Bangui, at least two children were beheaded and one of them was mutilated.

=== 2014 ===
In 2014, Amnesty International reported several massacres committed by anti-balaka militias against Muslim civilians, forcing thousands of Muslims to flee the country. On 13 January more than 100 people were killed by Anti-balaka in Bossemptélé massacre.

In 2014, the corpse of Camille Lepage, a missing French photojournalist, was found by French soldiers in a truck used by Anti-Balaka members.

On 24 June 100 Anti-balaka fighters attacked Bambari. Forty-six people were killed and 28 wounded.

=== 2017 ===
On 9 May 2017 Anti-balaka attacked UPC forces in Alindao before withdrawing to Mingala. On 13 May Anti-balaka attacked Bangassou killing more than 115 people including one peacekeeper. On 18 May heavy clashes erupted between Anti-balaka and ex-Seleka in Bria resulting in 26 deaths.

=== 2018 ===
On 31 October 2018 clashes broke out between anti-Balaka and ex-Séléka fighters in Batangafo resulting in at least 15 deaths.

=== 2019 ===
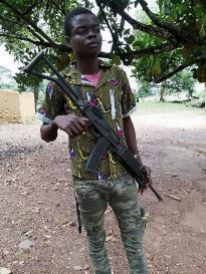
Anti-balaka fighter in Mobaye, 2019

In 2019, an Anti-balaka leader in Satema killed a 14-year-old girl in a ritualistic way to increase profit from mines.

=== 2020 ===
- 3 August: Anti-balaka attacked Grimari blocking roads to Sibut and Bambari. FACA managed to recapture city the same day killing one Anti-balaka commander.
- 23 October: Clashes erupted between two factions of Anti-balaka in Batangafo. Clashes were also reported later between Anti-balaka and ex-Séléka in the city. Seven people were killed (including three civilians and four militiamen) and more than 100 injured.
- 17 December: Anti-balaka joined Coalition of Patriots for Change.
- 26 December: Anti-balaka fighters from Kaga-Bandoro attacked Dekoa killing three Burundian peacekeepers. Three militiamen were arrested by MINUSCA forces.

=== 2021 ===
Since 2021, a large number of former Anti-balaka fighters have been recruited by Wagner Group into so-called Black Russians. They have been responsible for numerous war crimes, including the 2021 Boyo killings.

== Involvement in illegal trade ==
Similarly to Séléka and other armed groups involved in the war, the Anti-balaka have been involved in the illegal trade of diamond and gold, often seeking "protection payments" from economic operators. The group was also reported to attack and often kill Muslim and Fula farmers to steal and traffic their cattle. Additionally, the Anti-balaka have furthered the presence of an illegal logging sector, exploited mainly by the French Industrie forestière de Batalimo (IFB), Lebanese Société d’exploitation forestière centrafricaine (SEFCA) and Chinese Vicwood Group. In 2014 these companies paid approximately €127,864 to Anti-balaka militias at road checkpoints.
