= List of wars involving the Central African Republic =

This is a list of wars involving the Central African Republic and its antecedents.

Conflict	Combatant 1	Combatant 2	Results
Kongo-Wara rebellion (1928–1931)	Gbaya people	France	Defeat: Rebellion suppressed
Lord's Resistance Army insurgency (1987–present)	Uganda; DR Congo; Central African Republic; South Sudan; United Nations; United States	Lord's Resistance Army	Ongoing: The LRA has declined in recent years; Uganda pulled its forces out of the Central African Republic in 2017
Central African Republic Bush War (2004–2007)	Central African Republic; Chad; United Nations	Union of Democratic Forces for Unity; People's Army for the Restoration of Democracy; Convention of Patriots for Justice and Peace; Movement of Central African Liberators for Justice; Other groups	Stalemate: Peace agreement signed in 2007; Continued violence preceded the Central African Republic Civil War
Central African Republic Civil War (2012–present)	Central African Republic; MINUSCA (since 2014); EUTM-RCA (since 2016) Rwanda (since 2020); Russia (since 2018); Wagner Group; Russian Imperial Movement (until 2022); Black Russians; Azande Ani Kpi Gbe; Formerly: South Africa (2013); MISCA (2013–2014) MICOPAX (2008–2013): Angola; Cameroon; Chad; Morocco; Uganda; Congo-Brazzaville; DRC; Gabon; Burundi; Equatorial Guinea; São Tomé and Príncipe; France (2013–2021) EUFOR RCA (2014–2015): Estonia; Finland; Georgia; Latvia; Luxembourg; Netherlands; Portugal; Poland; Romania; Spain; Italy	Coalition of Patriots for Change (since 2020): Anti-balaka; FPRC; MPC elements (Note: Despite Mahamat al-Khatim's November 2023 announcement to leave CPC, some members of the group chose to stay in the coalition.); MPC; PRNC; CMSPR (since 2024) Support: Chad (alleged); RSF; Defunct groups: Séléka (2012–2014): CPJP; CPSK; UFDR; FDPC; FPR; RJ (2013–2018); MNLC (2017–2019); MLCJ (2008–2022); RPRC (2014–2022) UPC (2014–2025); 3R (2015–2025)	Ongoing: Séléka rebel coalition takes power from François Bozizé.; Michel Djotodia, the leader of Séléka, becomes president; President Michel Djotodia abolishes Séléka; Low-level fighting between Ex-Séléka factions and Anti-balaka militias.; President Michel Djotodia resigns amid heavy international pressure. Interim government is formed; Elections conducted in 2016 with Faustin-Archange Touadéra becoming the president; De facto split between ex-Séléka factions controlled north and east and Anti-balaka controlled south and west with a Séléka faction declaring the Republic of Logone.; Fighting between Ex-Séléka factions FPRC and UPC.; Ex-president Bozizé merges all rebel groups and forms the Coalition of Patriots for Change.; Elections in 2021 with Touadéra being re-elected as president.; As of July 2021 the government controls more territory than at any point since the war began.
