= Soumaine Ndodeba =

- Military career
- Allegiance: Union of Democratic Forces for Unity (2006–?); Séléka (2012–2014); Popular Front for the Rebirth of Central African Republic (?–2019); Party of the Rally of the Central African Nation (2019–present)
- Conflicts: Central African Republic Bush War; Central African Republic Civil War

Soumaine Ndodeba alias Tarzan is a Central African warlord from Vakaga.

== Life ==
=== Early career ===
Originally from Tiringoulou and a Gula, Ndodeba began his career as a guard for the Northern Region Development Program (PDRN) in 1997. When he worked as a guard, he gained military and tracking training from French, Swiss, American, and British trainers. From 2004 to 2007, he joined the elite private anti-poaching guard and conducted operations against hunters and herders. The guard was led by two Russians and ex-Foreign Legionnaires who dwelled at the Sangba base. He received a salary from a charity organization named the Association for the Protection of Central African Wildlife. While working at the elite guard, Russians gave Ndodeba the nickname Tarzan.

=== Rebellion ===
In April 2006, an unknown airplane landed at Tiringoulou airstrip, prompting the government to send Presidential Guard to the town, and they attacked the residents as well as burned houses. After the attack, Ndodeba returned to Tiringoulou to check on his family. However, he fled to the bush. In the bush, he found his colleagues who planned the uprising against the government. Soon after, he trained military skills to his companions in the bush. From there, he earned the title of colonel.

Ndodeba joined UFDR because he felt dismayed by the Ministry of Water and Forest's decision to choose only the trackers from Bangui and the surrounding area. He and his group launched an attack in Birao at the end of October 2006 and managed to seize the weapons from the government forces.

Ndodeba returned to his hometown, and an American medical charity appointed him as the local children's rights advocate. Apart from that, they trained him to be a football coach. As the government signed peace agreements with UFDR, he wanted to participate in the DDR program, hoping that he would receive training and money and be employed at government institutions. However, the program ended up in vain.

In December 2012, Ndodeba joined Seleka. As the Seleka tried to enter Bangui, he was shot and flown to Gabon for further medical treatment. He was then released from the hospital and returned to Tiringoulou for recovery. Afterward, he went to Bambari and joined RPRC. As he joined RPRC, his rank was promoted from colonel to general, and he became one of the group's important military leaders. He was designated as RPRC leader in Bambari. On 24 February 2017, he left Bambari due to the MINUSCA intervention that wanted to prevent the UPC-RPRC clash. He later left RPRC and joined PRNC in 2019.

== Bibliography ==
- Lombard, Louisa (2020). Hunting Game: Raiding Politics in the Central African Republic. Cambridge: Cambridge University Press. ISBN 9781108478779.
