= Oumar Younous =

Sudanese-Central African warlord and diamond smuggler

- Native name: عمر يونس
- Born: 2 April 1970; Tulus, South Darfur, Democratic Republic of Sudan
- Died: 10 or 11 November 2015 (aged 45) Sibut, Central African Republic
- Allegiance: Forces for the Unification of the Central African Republic; Movement of Central African Liberators for Justice; Union of Democratic Forces for Unity; Seleka; Popular Front for the Rebirth of Central African Republic (?-2015)
- Conflicts: Central African Bush War; Central African Republic Civil War

Oumar Younous Abdoulay (Arabic: عمر يونس عبدولاي; 2 April 1970 - 10 or 11 November 2015), also known as Oumar Sodiam, was a Sudanese-Central African warlord, military commander, and diamond smuggler.

== Life ==
Belonging to Fulani, Younous was born in Tulus, Sudan on 2 April 1970. Prior to the rebellion, he worked as the driver for SODIAM and as a diamond agent and trader in Nzacko, Bria, and Sam Ouandja. In 2006, he cooperated with the UFDR by collecting money from diamond collectors. Later on, he rejected the UFDR-government peace agreement and decided to establish a new armed group, Forces for the Unification of the Central African Republic (FURCA) or "Black Camp". Later, he joined MLJC in October 2008. In late 2009, he became a member of UFDR and served as the group's commander in the Bria-Sam-Ouandja area. Within the UFDR, he earned the general rank.

During the Seleka government, Djotodia appointed Younous as special adviser to the president and held a three-star general's rank. Although he secured a government position, he preferred to stay in the Bria-Sam-Ouandja area due to his diamond trading activity. Furthermore, he also reportedly raided and looted the SODIAM office. Upon the fall of the Seleka government, he joined FPRC. He continued diamond trading in Bria and Sam Ouandja and smuggled it to Sudan. UNSC imposed sanctions on Younous on 20 August 2025.

Younous died on 10 or 11 October 2015 in a clash between MINUSCA and FPRC in Sibut.

== Personal life ==
Younouss was Abakar Sabone's brother-in-law.

== Bibliography ==
- Dalby, Ned (2015). "A Multifaceted Business: Diamonds in the Central African Republic". In Carayannis, Tatiana; Lombard, Louisa (eds.). Making Sense of the Central African Republic. Zed Books.
- Weyns, Yannick; Hoex, Lotte; Hilgert, Filip; Spittaels, Steven (November 2014). Mapping Conflict Motives: The Central African Republic (PDF) (Report).
- UN Security Council (December 2015). Letter dated 21 December 2015 from the Panel of Experts on the Central African Republic extended pursuant to Security Council resolution 2196 (2015) addressed to the President of the Security Council (PDF) (Report).
