= Arda Hakouma =

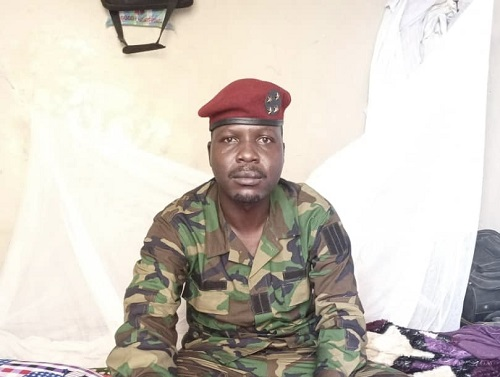
- Born: Boromata, Central African Republic
- Allegiance: Séléka; Popular Front for the Rebirth of Central African Republic; Patriotic Rally for the Renewal of the Central African Republic; Movement for Democracy and the Central African Republic
- Conflicts: Central African Bush War; Chadian Civil War; Central African Republic Civil War: Battle of Bangui

Arda Hakouma is a Central African warlord and military commander.

== Life ==
Hakouma was born in Boromata. He participated in the Central African Bush War and fought alongside the rebels in the Chadian Civil War. During the 2012-2013 Seleka offensive, Hakouma led the militia along the Bossangoa-Bossembele-Boali axis and served as the group's chief of operations. He claimed that his forces killed 36 SANDF soldiers. Hakouma became the Seleka militia leaders in the Battle of Bangui, replacing Issa Issaka Aubin, who received a leg injury. Later, he was appointed as the Michel Djotodia's Head of Security.

Upon the fall of the Seleka government, Hakouma joined the FPRC rebel. He was elected as FPRC's Chief of Military Staff on 2 November 2014 in the ex-Seleka meeting in Kaga-Bandoro. At the end of November 2014, FPRC rebels led by Hakouma captured Bria from RPRC. MINUSCA dislodged Hakouma and his troops from Bria on 10 February 2015. In December 2015, he tried to kidnap Arnaud Djoubaye Abazène in Tiringoulou to prevent the referendum took place in the town. However, Abazène's abduction failed due to the strong resistance from the town's residents through demonstration, causing Hakouma and his forces to flee his base located within the Central African Republic–Sudan border area. He joined RPRC in the unknown year and served as one of the group's military leaders.

In January 2023, Hakouma founded Movement for Democracy and the Central African Republic (MDRPC) and served as its leader. The Chadian authorities arrested Hakouma on 5 January 2025 in Tissi on the accusation of establishing contact with the Chadian rebel group Union of Resistance Forces (UFR). Afterwards, he was transferred to Arasse Mangagne and then jailed in Am Timan.

== Bibliography ==
- UN Security Council (December 2015). Letter dated 21 December 2015 from the Panel of Experts on the Central African Republic extended pursuant to Security Council resolution 2196 (2015) addressed to the President of the Security Council (PDF) (Report).
