= March 2022 attacks in the Central African Republic =

- Part of Central African Republic Civil War
Date	6–18 March 2022
Location	Vakaga and Bamingui-Bangoran, Central African Republic

Belligerents
Wagner Group; Central African Republic	FPRC; MLCJ; RPRC; Anti-balaka

Commanders and leaders
	Noureddine Adam; Baba Amibe †

Casualties and losses
4+ killed	8+ killed
- 100s killed, 1,000s displaced

Map of places mentioned

In March 2022 Russian mercenaries from Wagner Group supported by armed forces launched an offensive against armed groups in the northeastern parts of the Central African Republic (CAR) during which they killed dozens of rebels and possibly hundreds of civilians including citizens of Chad, Niger, Sudan and CAR who were working there as artisanal miners, herders and camel drivers while displacing thousands. The events have been described by multiple sources including domestic in the Central African Republic as well as in Sudan based on survivor testimony.

== Timeline of events ==
From 6 to 9 March armed forces conducted operation against rebels from Coalition of Patriots for Change in Ndah in Vakaga prefecture as well as in Bamingui-Bangoran on Chari axis against Anti-balaka and other CPC-affiliated groups. On 9 March in Tiri area armed forces clashes with local herders after altercation.

On 11 March 2022 Russian mercenaries from Wagner Group left the town of N'Délé heading north. In Gounda village they were stopped by over a dozen rebels from Popular Front for the Rebirth of Central African Republic (FPRC). They clashed for two hours after which the rebels were forced to retreat after running out of ammunition. Four Russians and six rebels were killed as well as two civilians hit by bullets while trying to escape. After the battle Russians continued towards Gordil village.

After arriving in Gordil on 13 March they started conducting door to door searches. When civilian population started panicking they opened fire killing at least 20 people. Meanwhile another group of Russians attacked Tiringoulou village where they killed 12 people including FPRC general Baba Amibe with his wife and three children. They also killed local village chief. Meanwhile in Sam Ouandja one rebel fighters was killed.

On the night from 14 to 15 March Russian mercenaries arrived in Sikkikede village in Vakaga where they clashed with rebels from FPRC, RPRC and MLCJ. At least 20 people were killed on both sides and some houses and shops caught fire. Many civilians fled to Birao and Chad. From there Russians continued towards Boromata where they clashed with local rebels before finally arriving in Birao. They killed three herders in Boromata. When they arrived on 15 March in Birao local rebels from MLCJ and RPRC armed group withdrew from the town towards border with Sudan. On the same day they arrived in Ouanda Djallé village. Then Russians continued towards Am Dafok village on the border with Sudan however they stopped 30 km from the village after receiving phone call from Bangui and turned around to return to N'Délé. Before retreating they killed nine camel drivers.

At 1 April it was reported that 523 refugees have arrived in N'dele from Bamingui-Bangoran and Vakaga following clashes.

On 11 and 12 April Russian mercenaries again went to Gordil and Ndah villages where they killed between 10 and 22 people and burned motorcycles. UN subsequently launched investigation into the killings.

=== Massacre of artisanal miners ===
Between 14 and 18 March 2022 Russian mercenaries attacked civilians in mining areas in the area according to survivors who fled to Sudan. Hundreds of people were possibly killed and thousands displaced with artisanal miners losing millions of US dollars' worth of property. Among those killed were citizens of Sudan, Chad, Niger and the Central African Republic. According to one of the survivors interviewed by Middle East Eye reporter, Adam Zakaria, Russians attacked mining sites around Andaha with attack helicopters, tanks and armed 4x4 vehicles. He said 50 people including six members of his family were killed and that mercenaries tracked refugees until they reached Sudan. Another survivor, Zakaria Mohamed Abdallah, described Russian attack on Silonka near Andaha. He said that he saw at least 20 bodies and that he was looted while fleeing on a motorcycle towards border crossing of Am Dafock. Haroun Adam said that Russians supported by government fighters attacked miners in different locations in and around Andaha killing dozens of people from Chad and Sudan.

In the interview with Darfur24, Adam Zakaria Abkar (possibly the same person as in previous paragraph) said that Russians attacked artisanal miners in Gordil while they were returning from grinding stones that would be used for extracting gold. Residents of the Gordil village buried bodies of those killed in local cemeteries. Adam Zakaria said that he managed to escape Wagner after fleeing to the bush, while nine other people who tried to escape were killed. He also said that thirteen people from his village went missing after escaping. In Bulbul Abu Jazo village in South Darfur prayer was held for four of village residents who were killed in the Central African Republic. According to another survivor interviewed by Darfur24, Hussein Abu Nidal, on 14 March four Sudanese approached Russian base and soldiers shot them killing three. According to unnamed eyewitness unknown armed men attacked the Andha mine day after that.
