= Tom Adam =

Central African warlord (died 2022)

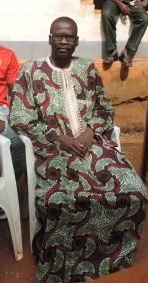
- Adam in 2014
- Born: Boromata, Central African Republic
- Died: 10 July 2023 near Sam Ouandja, Central African Republic
- Military career
- Allegiance: Patriotic Rally for the Renewal of the Central African Republic
- Service years: 2013–2023

Tom Adam (died 2022) alias "Bin Laden" was a Central African warlord from the Patriotic Rally for the Renewal of the Central African Republic armed group.

== Life ==
Born in Boromata, Adam was member of Goula ethnic group.

A former Séléka zone commander, he beat up a woman who complained to him about theft. In early 2013 he ransacked the Ndassima gold mining site which caused Djotodia to replace him with Ali Darassa. He moved to Bambari where he led Goula faction of Séléka. In 2014 or 2015 he arrived in Sam Ouandja after being forced to leave Bambari. He led local faction of FPRC. On 25 October 2015 he threatened to kill another FPRC general Alanta.

In December 2019 he met with Sudanese armed groups to allow them to settle near Sam Ouanjda to grow marijuana. As of 2021 he was in charge of RPRC under command of Damane Zakaria in Sam Ouandja with "Alanta" being his deputy.

Allied in 2022 with Noureddine Adam, nominated as CPC commander of Bamingui-Bangoran region. He participated in capture of FACA soldiers in Sikkikede in February 2023.

He was killed by Rwandan contingent of MINUSCA on 10 July 2023 outside of the town of Sam Ouandja.
