= Takamala =

- Location in the Central African Republic
- Coordinates: 10°14′5″N 22°27′32″E
- Country: Central African Republic
- Prefecture: Vakaga
- Sub-prefecture: Birao
- Commune: Ridina
- Time zone: UTC + 1

Takamala is a village in Vakaga Prefecture, Central African Republic.

== History ==
In 1962, Takamala had a population of 168 people.

Around 2007, UNICEF repaired two pumps in Takamala.

On 17 January 2020, a clash between MLCJ and FPRC took place in Takamala.

== Education ==
There is one school in the village.

== Healthcare ==
Takamala has one public health post.
