= Takadja =

- Location in Central African Republic
- Coordinates: 10°10′35″N 22°25′10″E
- Country: Central African Republic
- Prefecture: Vakaga
- Sub-prefecture: Birao
- Commune: Ridina

Takadja, also known as Takandja, is a village situated in Vakaga Prefecture, Central African Republic.

== History ==
Takadja had a population of 252 people in 1962.

In January 2020, FPRC controlled the village. A conflict erupted between Taaisha Arabs from Darfur and Gula in Takadja in May 2025 due to the ambush of unknown group to the Gula Self-Defense Group when they searched the robbers who robbed Gula motorcycle taxi driver in the Boromata-Takadja axis. During the conflict, Taaisha armed group attacked shops and robbed goats and donkeys in the village. Responding to the conflict, MINUSCA troops were deployed to Takadja and they arrested six persons who owned weapons.

== Education ==
There is a school in the village.
