= Joseph Zoundeiko =

- Born: 1969; Tiringoulou, Vakaga
- Died: 11 February 2017 (aged 47); Bambari, Ouaka
- Military career
- Allegiance: Union of Democratic Forces for Unity
- Service years: 2006 – 2012
- Military career
- Allegiance: Séléka
- Service years: 2012 – 2014
- Military career
- Allegiance: Popular Front for the Rebirth of Central African Republic
- Service years: 2014 – 2017

General Joseph Zoundeiko (or Zindeko) (born 1969, died 11 February 2017) was the leader of military wing of the Central African rebel militia alliance, Séléka.

== Early life and career ==
Born in Tiringoulou, Vakaga, he worked as a guard and tracker, securing parklands on the northwestern borders of the country from poachers from neighboring Chad and South Sudan. He joined the CAR army in 1997 and was promoted to lieutenant. In 2006, he joined the UFDR rebel group. President Muchel Djototia later promoted him to major, then colonel and brigadier general. He was appointed on May 9, 2014 by a Séléka congress that gathered more than 500 officers and officials in N'Délé. He has rejected the ceasefire deal agreed between Séléka and the largely Christian Anti-balaka militias on July 24, 2014, saying the deal had been negotiated without proper input from the military wing. After the dissolution of Séléka, he became head of the Popular Front for the Renaissance of the Central African Republic (FPRC) and often fought with the largely Fulani and rival ex-Séléka militia, the Union for Peace in the Central African Republic (UPC) led by General Ali Darrassa. The FPRC reported on 12 February 2017 that Zoundeiko was killed when a UN helicopter fired on fighters advancing towards the town of Bambari the day before.

== See also ==
- Central African Republic Civil War
