= People's Army for the Restoration of Democracy =

- 'Armée Populaire pour la restauration de la démocratie
- Other name: APRD
- Leaders: Florian Djadder; Jean-Jacques Démafouth; Laurent Ndignoue; Henri Tchebo Wafio
- Military leader: Lakoye Maradas
- Spokesperson: Bienvenue Dokoto
- Dates active: January 2006 – 2008
- Ideology: Pro-Patassé
- Wars: Central African Republic Bush War

Advances and maximum territorial control of APRD

The People's Army for the Restoration of Democracy (French: L’Armée Populaire pour la restauration de la démocratie abbr. APRD) was a rebel group operating in the northwest of the Central African Republic. The APRD was formed in 2006 following the 2003 coup which overthrew President Ange-Félix Patassé. It is one of several groups which fought in the 2004-2007 Central African Republic Bush War. Initially claiming it wished to overthrow current CAR President François Bozizé, the APRD was the last of the three rebel coalitions to engage in the 2007 peace process. The group participated in the 2008 Inclusive Peace Dialog, and in early 2009 entered a coalition government with Bozizé and other civil and military oppositions groups.

== 2006–2007: formation and war ==
The APRD was initially formed of elements of the Patassé's former Presidential Guard, along with autonomous semi-armed community defense groups of the northeast of the CAR. Between these two elements, the APRD fielded around a thousand fighters, most poorly armed. The APRD initially appeared in an attack on government forces in the northeastern town of Paoua in January 2006. Initially led by former presidential guard lieutenant Florian Djadder, the APRD became a coalition of former Patassé loyalists, and local northeastern groups, some armed only with homemade weapons, who had appeared after CAR army attacks on northern towns in 2006. From 2006, the APRD was one of three politico-military fronts engaged in a war against the government of the CAR. These other groups were the Democratic Front of the Central African People (FDPC) led by Abdoulaye Miskine and the Union of Democratic Forces for Unity (UFDR) led by Zakaria Damane, both based in the northeast of the nation, near the regional center of Birao. During the 2006–2007 fighting, the APRD was accused of using child soldiers and a number of human rights abuses. The APRD in turn, accused the government of widespread attacks upon civilians and human rights violations. Low level fighting between the government, the APRD, and armed criminal gangs continued sporadically in Ouham, Ouham-Pende, and Nana-Grebizi Departments throughout 2006, and up until the 2008 cease fire. Human Rights Watch has reported that APRD bands have not only attacked government targets, but systematically extorted taxation from local people, looted villages and stolen herds. In response "CAR security forces have committed serious and widespread abuses against the civilian population, including multiple summary executions and unlawful killings, widespread burning of civilian homes, and the forced displacement of hundreds of thousands of persons, instilling terror in the civilian population."

== 2008 peace process ==
Since March 2008, the APRD began its conversion from a military coalition, to a political front. The political voice of the APRD, Captain Laurent Djim Woei Bebiti, was superseded in his political role as the group's first President, exiled former Patassé Defense Minister Jean-Jacques Démafouth, was chosen by a congress of the party. Démafouth reported that he did not seek the post, and only accepted it as a civilian leader on the condition that "the APRD must agree to an inclusive political dialogue and sign a peace accord with the Bangui authorities." President Bozizé had proposed this "inclusive dialogue" process on 8 October 2007.

After a number of failed peace building attempts, the APRD signed a cease fire on 9 May 2008. Along with the Union of Democratic Forces for Unity (UFDR) rebels led by Michel Detodia, the APRD then agreed a Comprehensive Peace Agreement with the APRD and UFDR on 21 June 2008 in Libreville, in a process negotiated by Gabon President Omar Bongo.

The APRD delegation to President Bozizé's December 2008 Inclusive Political Dialogue (IPD) was led by Démafouth, APRD spokesman Bienvenue Dokoto, and APRD military leader Colonel Lakoye Maradas. Participants in this 12-day conference also included Former President Patassé, a civilian opposition umbrella called the United Stakeholders Force (UFVN), the Democratic Front of the Central African People (FDPC) rebels, and the Movement of Central African Liberators for Justice (MLCJ) rebels. Planned for several months, the APRD and others had walked out of planning for the IPD in October 2008 over concerns about proposed amnesty laws. An agreement on the IPD was finally reached with the mediation of Gabonese President Omar Bongo. The December meetings agreed a plan to form a multi-party government of national unity and to prepare for elections in 2010, along with a nationwide "truth and reconciliation" commission.

On 30 December 2008, Démafouth represented the APRD at a reconciliation ceremony in Paoua, Ouham-Pendé, CAR. Démafouth addressed government, rebel, NGO, and civil society leaders and "asked for forgiveness from the population of the city and announced that all the barriers erected by the APRD would be lifted" allowing free travel from the north to the south of the country.

In January 2009 the APRD had one of its members chosen for the 32 member cabinet of president Bozizé. François Naouyama became environment minister, while one UFDR leader became minister for housing. The APRD leadership has criticized the appointments as too little.

== See also ==
- Central African Republic Bush War
