= Corruption in the Central African Republic =

Corruption in the Central African Republic is tied to underdevelopment, fragmentation, and pervasive poverty in the country. Ranked 149th out of 180 countries on Transparency International's 2024 Corruption Perceptions Index, the Central African Republic's abundant natural resources have failed to translate into economic prosperity due to a succession of ineffective governments.

== Failed governance ==
David Dacko served as the country’s first president after the Central African Republic officially gained independence from France in 1960. Five years later, he was ousted during the Saint-Sylvestre coup d'état by Colonel Jean-Bédel Bokassa. The CAR’s government had since operated according to the personal ambition of Bokassa. He ruled through the assimilation of power, which he justified as necessary for development. He would later establish the Central African Empire, installing himself as the emperor.

Bokassa had ruled the country for a total of eleven years until he was deposed in a 1979 coup. His regime was marked by nepotism, vacillation, and corruption. The state of the country’s affairs may be demonstrated in the reason for the military coup that caused his overthrow. An account cited that aside from corruption, which was one of the officially cited reasons for the coup, there was widespread complaint among junior officers and the rank and file concerning the unequal competition from politicians, who were able to acquire the best mistresses in Bangui.

Bokassa’s regime was also marked by brutal repression of political opposition and severe human rights abuses. For example, he killed his Minister of State, Captain Alexander Banza, after the official led a failed coup. He was brutally mutilated in a public execution. Bokassa also personally participated in the massacre of 100 school children, which was carried out by members of his imperial guard. This incident caused a French military intervention that reestablished the republic. Dacko was reinstated as president after Bokassa fled the country in 1979.

Corruption continued in the Central African Republic after Bokassa’s downfall. Noted cases include charges of widespread corruption and embezzlement of funds under André Kolingba's regime. He was accused of stealing from the national treasury to finance personal expenditures and to maintain his position. His successor, Ange-Félix Patassé, also left a legacy of tribalism due to the alleged ethnic favoritism and tribalism perpetuated by his administration. Corruption was also the main issue François Bozizé faced several military coups. For instance, Bozizé, who came to power in 2003, was implicated in the illegal extraction of natural resources such as diamond and timber. The short term of his successor, Michel Djotodia, was also marred by corruption. His regime was accused of looting state assets in addition to various corrupt practices.

The Central African Republic's (CAR) persistent struggle with corruption, evidenced by numerous scandals since independence, has severely hampered its economic development, political stability, and social fabric. Despite abundant natural resources such as diamonds, gold, and uranium, endemic corruption among political elites and government officials has resulted in a dismal GDP of only $2.52 billion. This figure pales in comparison to the economic performance of Rwanda, a more populous population nation with fewer natural resources, which according to the World Bank, achieved a GDP of $11 billion in 2021.

== Anti-corruption reform ==
In order to address corruption, the CAR has adopted several anti-corruption measures. In 2006, the country ratified the United Nations Convention Against Corruption and this has led to the criminalization of acts of corruption. By 2017, the High Authority for Good Governance was also established and it is mandated to promote good governance. In terms of transparency, the current iteration of the CAR’s constitution requires the President, Prime Minister, and government officials to declare their assets. Out of the measures introduced to achieve reform, the CAR still struggles with corruption due to weak constitutional framework for corruption. This may be seen in governance frameworks that criminalize corruption and provide for the equitable and transparent distribution of resources. There is the case of the High Authority for Good Governance. The work of this agency is undermined by the CAR’s weak judiciary, which tend to disregard corruption cases.

== International rankings ==
In Transparency International's 2025 Corruption Perceptions Index, the CAR scored 24 on a scale from 0 ("highly corrupt") to 100 ("very clean"). When ranked by score, the CAR ranked 150th among the 182 countries in the Index, where the country ranked first is perceived to have the most honest public sector. For comparison with regional scores, the best score among sub-Saharan African countries (Note: Angola, Benin, Botswana, Burkina Faso, Burundi, Cameroon, Cape Verde, Central African Republic, Chad, Comoros, Côte d'Ivoire, Democratic Republic of the Congo, Djibouti, Equatorial Guinea, Eritrea, Eswatini, Ethiopia, Gabon, Gambia, Ghana, Guinea, Guinea-Bissau, Kenya, Lesotho, Liberia, Madagascar, Malawi, Mali, Mauritania, Mauritius, Mozambique, Namibia, Niger, Nigeria, Republic of the Congo, Rwanda, Sao Tome and Principe, Senegal, Seychelles, Sierra Leone, Somalia, South Africa, South Sudan, Sudan, Tanzania, Togo, Uganda, Zambia, and Zimbabwe.) was 68, the average was 32 and the worst was 9. For comparison with worldwide scores, the best score was 89 (ranked 1), the average was 42, and the worst was 9 (ranked 181, in a two-way tie).
