= Zakaria Damane =

Central African warlord (died 2022)

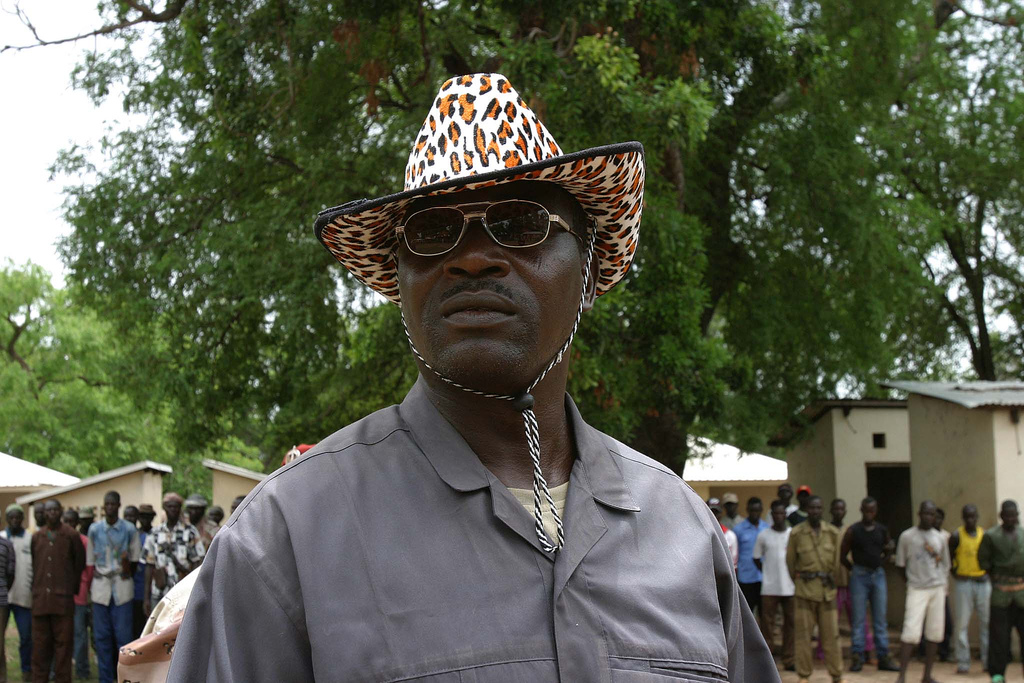
- Zakaria Damane in his native village of Boromata
- Born: Boromata, Central African Republic
- Died: 12 February 2022; Ouadda, Central African Republic
- Military career
- Allegiance: Patriotic Rally for the Renewal of the Central African Republic
- Service years: 2014–2022

Zakaria Damane (death 12 February 2022) was a Central African warlord and leader of Patriotic Rally for the Renewal of the Central African Republic armed group.

== Early life and career ==
Damane was born Moustapha Maloum in Boromata in Vakaga prefecture. He belonged to the Goula ethnic group. He began his career as a diamond miner near Bria and later became the boss of diamond mining. In 2002, upon hearing of the death of Yaya Ramadan, he moved to Tiringoulou to revenge the death. He then worked as an anti-poaching guard and advisor to the mayor of Boromata. As an advisor, he was assigned to collect taxes from herders.

== Rebellion ==
In 2006, Presidential Guard ransacked Tiringoulou and the PG soldiers attempted to arrest him. However, he managed to escape to the bush. Due to this incident, aggravated by the state negligence in Vakaga, Damane and Sabone decided to rebel against the François Bozizé government by creating the Union of Democratic Forces for Unity armed group. He signed Birao Accord in April 2007. Bozizé appointed Damane as advisor of disarmament, demobilization, and reintegration (DDR) on 13 January 2011. In 2012 he joined Séléka coalition. Later he became a general in Popular Front for the Rebirth of Central African Republic which formed from ex-Séléka. In 2014 he created Patriotic Rally for the Renewal of the Central African Republic as a splinter group from FPRC.

He was killed on 12 February 2022 by Russian mercenaries from Wagner Group in Ouadda together with 20 of his men.

== See also ==
- Central African Republic Civil War
