= Koumbal =

- Location in the Central African Republic
- Coordinates: 9°22′56″N 22°42′11″E
- Country: Central African Republic
- Prefecture: Vakaga
- Sub-prefecture: Birao
- Commune: Ouandja
- Time zone: UTC + 1

Koumbal is a village in Vakaga Prefecture, Central African Republic.

== History ==
LRA attacked Koumbal twice in 2010. The first attack occurred on 27 September and LRA kidnapped seven villagers. The second attack happened on 26 October, in which LRA abducted four civilians and looted the village's goods.

== Education ==
There is one school in the village.

== Healthcare ==
Koumbal has one public health post.
