= Terfel, Central African Republic =

Terfel
- Location in Central African Republic
- Coordinates: 10°11′44″N 22°56′22″E
- Country: Central African Republic
- Prefecture: Vakaga
- Sub-prefecture: Birao
- Commune: Ridina

Terfel, often written Terfele, is a village situated in Vakaga Prefecture, Central African Republic.

== History ==
After Central African Republic gained its independence from France, Arab nomad pastoralists from Darfur began to go to Terfel to obtain new grazing land as cross border travel eased. They only settled in Terfel for five months and later went back to Darfur. However, the 1973 Sahelian drought triggered more Darfur pastoralists came to Terfel to secure their livestock and they also brought the entire family. Furthermore, they also extended their period of stay in the village more than five months.

Starting in 2013, the seasonal ponds in Terfel dried up, forcing the pastoralists to deepened their wells. Consequently, the pastures were only present around the water sources, leading to the overgrazing. In March 2020, Messiria armed group and Janjaweed attacked Terfel, killing 20-25 Falata pastoralists and stole approximately 100 cattle.

== Economy ==
Cassava used to be the main crop in Terfel. However, the damage caused by the herders forced most of the farmers to abandon cassava cultivation. Those who still insisted to plant cassava had to construct bamboo fences along their farming plot. As a result, the villagers switched their income activities to farming peanuts or collecting bamboo.

== Education ==
There is a school in Terfel. Radio Ndeke Luka reported that in March 2025 the school lacked equipment and qualified teachers.

== Bibliography ==
- Tidjani, Ibrahim (2018). La mobilité pastorale en République Centrafricaine : une stratégie d’adaptation soutenable? (Doctoral thesis). University of Lille.
