= 2020 N'Délé clashes =

Conflicts in 2020

Coordinates: 8°24′33″N 20°39′11″E

- Part of the Central African Republic Civil War
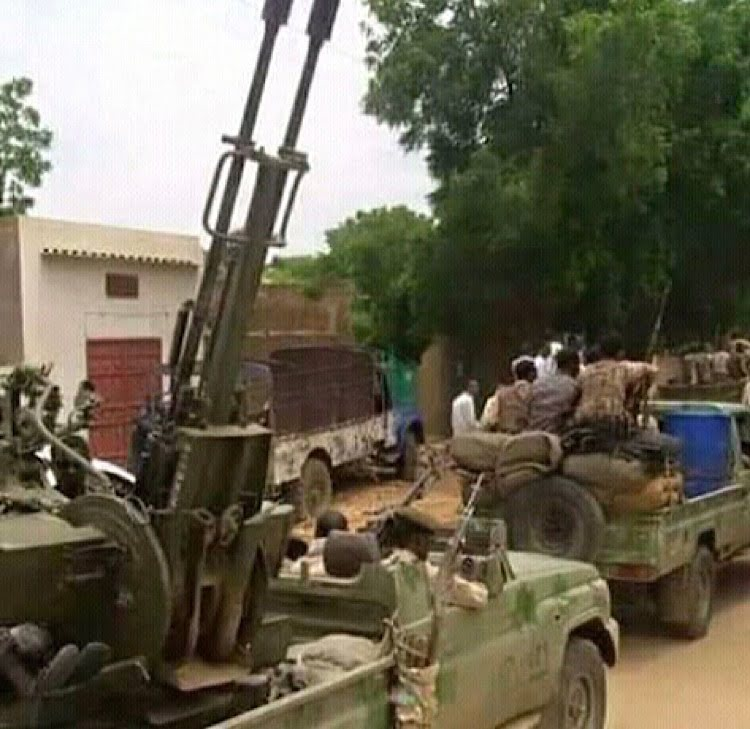
- RPRC military vehicle in N'Délé, 11 March 2020
Date	2 March – 19 May 2020
Location	N'Délé, Central African Republic
Result	FPRC victory: RPRC coalition withdraws from N'Délé; Peace agreement signed with splinter faction of FPRC

Belligerents
FPRC	MLCJ; RPRC: PRNC; Goula factions of FPRC	(United Nations) MINUSCA: Pakistan; Portugal (from 10 May); Rwanda (from 10 May); (Central African Republic) FACA (from 13 May)

Commanders and leaders
Noureddine Adam; Abdoulaye Hissène; Moctar Adam	Damane Zakaria; Azor Kalité (surrendered); Antar Hamat (surrendered); Charfadine Moussa (surrendered)	(Central African Republic) Faustin-Archange Touadéra

Strength
	100+ (MLCJ); 60+ (RPRC)	50+ vehicles

Casualties and losses
Dozens killed and injured	Dozens killed and injured 13 captured	(United Nations) 1 killed
- Around 100 people killed, 3,000+ displaced

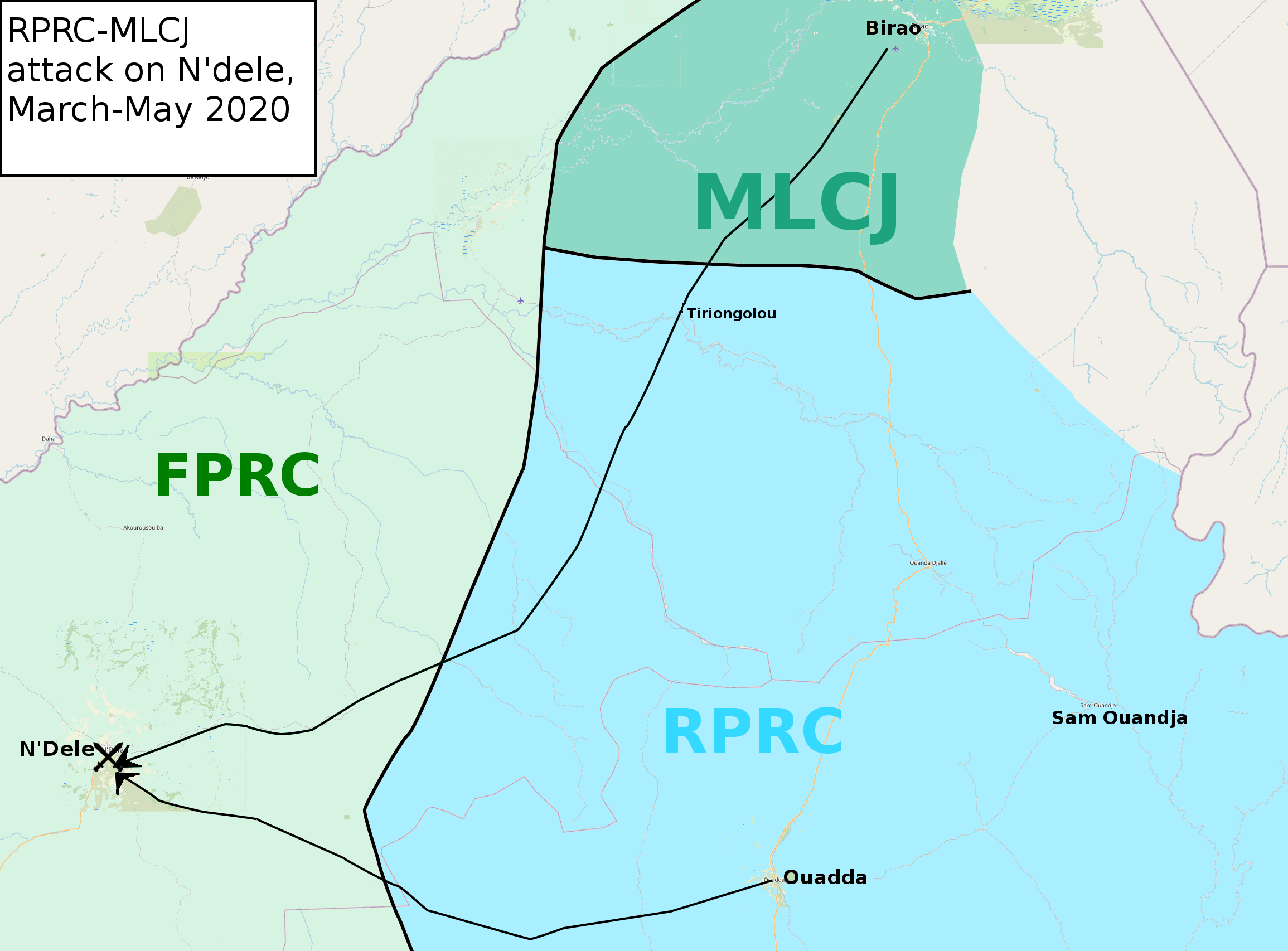
Map of clashes

In 2020 heavy clashes between ex-Séléka groups erupted in N'Délé in Central African Republic. Fighting was largely along ethnic lines between Rounga factions of FPRC and ethnically Goula and Kara rebel groups.

== History ==
On 2 March 2020 FPRC fighters killed an RPRC colonel. FPRC refused to execute the fighters responsible for the attack. Two days later heavy clashes erupted between both groups in N'Délé, leading to several people being killed and injured. On 5 March both sides received reinforcement from Birao and surrounding villages. At 5 am clashes were reported 5 km from N'Délé. Thousands of refugees, mainly from Goula ethnic groups, began to gather at the MINUSCA base near the airport. On 7 March 2020, a MINUSCA staff member was killed in N'Délé during clashes. RPRC was forced to withdraw from N'Délé and the prefect of Bamingui fled the city. His residence was occupied by FPRC. On 8 March six alleged members of FPRC were murdered by RPRC. The number of refugees reached 3,000. On 9 March around 100 members of MLCJ arrived from Vakaga to reinforce RPRC positions. On 11 March RPRC with support of MLCJ attacked FPRC positions in N'Délé seizing half of city and looting and burning central market and FPRC leader residence. More than 40 civilians were killed.

On 18 March it was reported that FPRC controlled Ndélé while RPRC controlled surrounding villages. On 25 March RPRC attacked Gozbéda village 7 km from Ndélé destroying homes. FPRC reinforcement clashed with them leading to three FPRC and seven RPRC fighters being killed. On 28 March more than 60 fighters reinforced RPRC positions. Day later fighting has reached outskirts of Ndélé. On 30 March armed FPRC fighters forced refugees to leave IDP camp.

On 1 April 2020 clashes erupted between Goula and Rounga factions of FPRC in Bornou neighborhood of N'Délé. Soldiers demanded resignation of FPRC chief, Moctar Adam. On 6 April fighting resumed with blasts being heard in the city. RPRC coalition attacked N'Délé from four sides. On 15 April UN reported that situation started to improve after FPRC chief returned to city. However, on 29 April RPRC and MLCJ attacked central market in N'Délé killing at least 37 people After attack RPRC withdrew towards Artisanat, Mourouba, Sodeca and Mbatta neighborhoods which were abandoned by civilian population. They established their base in local church and captured two technicals which were later destroyed according to FPRC. On 10 May Rwandan and Portuguese peacekeepers arrived in the city to force RPRC fighters to leave the city. On 12 May clashes between FPRC and RPRC erupted again in a village 2 km from Ndélé after alleged act of robbery by FPRC fighters leading to four fighters and two civilians being killed.

== Aftermath ==
On 13 May 2020 FACA was deployed in N'Délé in the former base of FPRC for the first time since 2012.

On 19 May MINUSCA arrested nine RPRC fighters in N'Délé including general Azor Kalité while they were trying to escape to Tirigoulou. They were transferred two days later to Bangui. They have been accused of war crimes and crimes against humanity. On 25 May MINUSCA arrested two RPRC fighters 16 km from N'Délé followed by another two day later including general Amar.

On 27 August pact of non-aggression in Bamingui-Bangoran was signed between Goula and Rounga factions of FPRC.

== Legal proceedings ==
On 5 December 2023 the Special Criminal Court (CPS), a UN-backed hybrid tribunal based in Bangui, opened the trial in case related to N'Délé massacres, with four (Azor Kalite, Charfadine Moussa, Antar Hamat and Oscar Wordjonodroba) of the ten accused present. They were accused of homicide, attacks on the health and physical or mental well-being of persons, cruel treatment, attacks on the civilian population of Ndélé and pillaging. On 16 April 2024, after two months of delay due to lawyers' strike, the court resumed hearings. Abdoulaye Hissène was also questioned in a different case stemming from the same events. On 13 December 2024 Azor Kalité was sentenced to 20 years in prison and Charfadine Moussa, Antar Hamat and Oscar Wordjonodroba to 15 years in prison for crime against humanity committed during the attack.
