= Bozizé =

Bozizé is a surname. Notable people with the surname include:

- François Bozizé (born 1946), Central African politician
- Monique Bozizé (fl. from 2003), Central African politician
