= Central African Bush War =

Civil war, 2004–2007

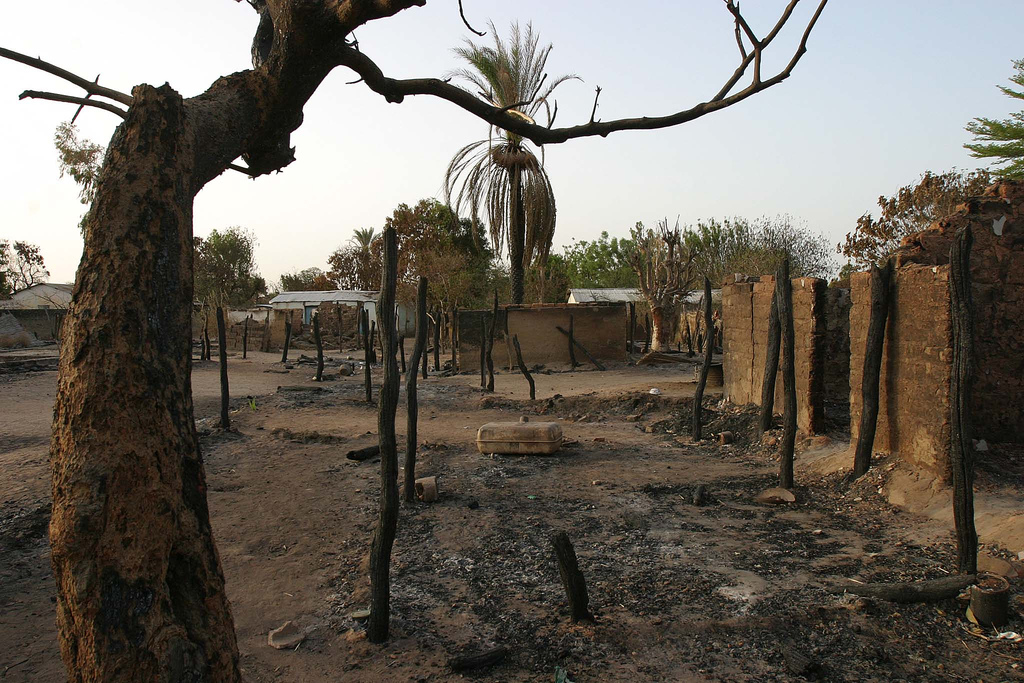
- The town of Birao in northern CAR which was largely burnt down during the fighting in 2007
Date	23 November 2004 – 1 April 2007 (2 years, 4 months, 1 week and 2 days)
Location	Central African Republic
Result	Violence persists despite an April 2007 peace agreement; Eventual outbreak of a second civil war in 2012

Belligerents
Rebels: Union of Democratic Forces for Unity (UFDR); People's Army for the Restoration of Democracy (APRD); Convention of Patriots for Justice and Peace (CPJP); Movement of Central African Liberators for Justice (MLCJ)...and others: Patriotic Convention for Saving the Country (CPSK); Democratic Front of the Central African People (FDPC); FDC; GALPC; FPR	Central African Republic; Chad

Commanders and leaders
Michel Djotodia (UFDR, GAPLC); Abakar Sabon (MLCJ); Justin Hassane (FDC)	François Bozizé; Idriss Déby; José Victor da Silva Ângelo; Jean-Célestin Dogo †

Strength
150+	4,500+

Casualties and losses
- Civilian casualties: 400+ killed, 212,000 displaced

Map of Central African Republic Bush War

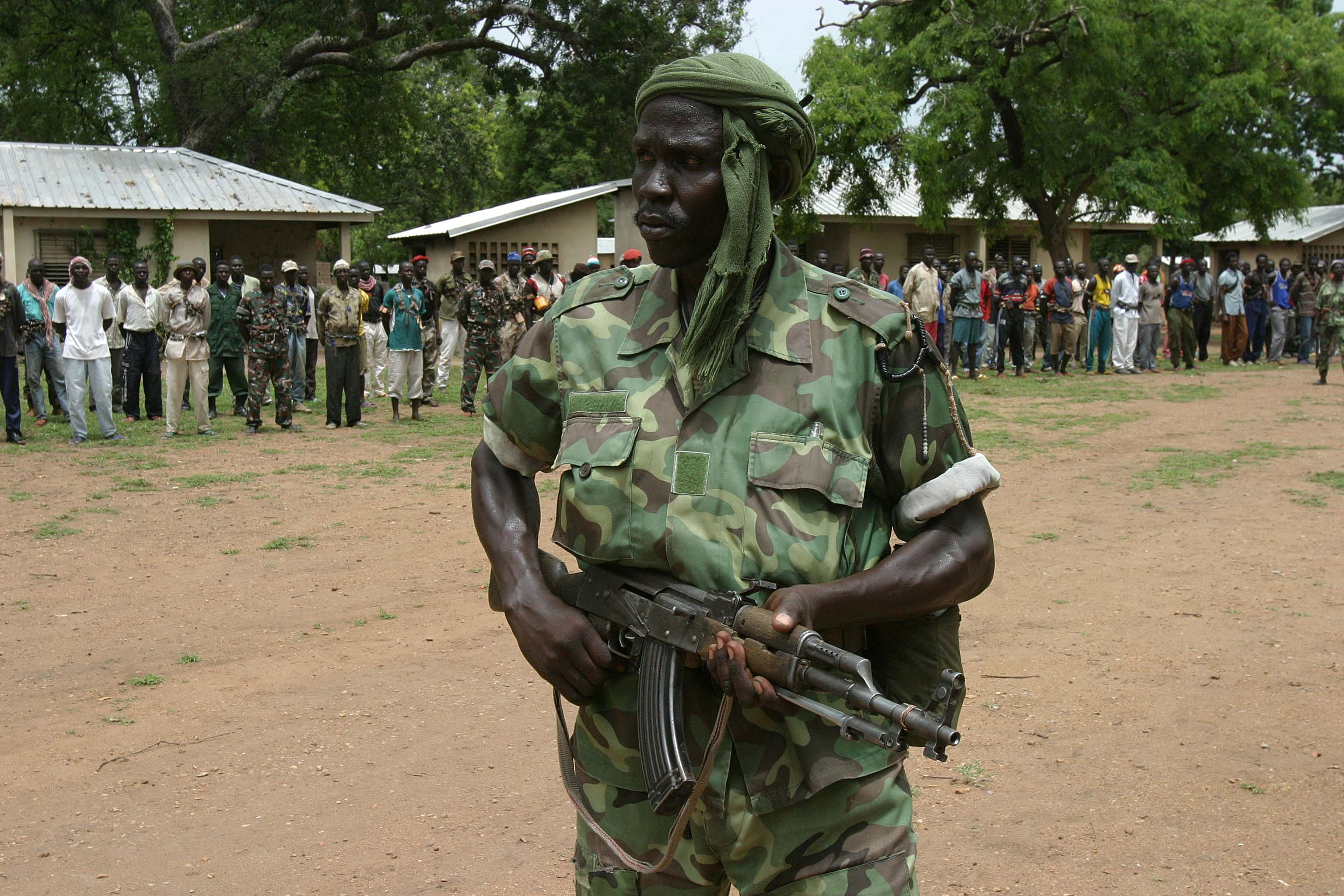
Rebel in northern Central African Republic, 2007

The Central African Bush War was a civil war in the Central African Republic which lasted from 2004 to 2007 between Union of Democratic Forces for Unity (UFDR) rebels and government forces. The rebellion began after François Bozizé seized the nation's presidency in 2003. Actual fighting began in 2004. Around 10,000 people were displaced because of the civil unrest.

The rebellion consisted of multiple rebel groups, several of which were of very small size and founded only towards the end of the conflict. Apart from the UFDR, the conflict included the People's Army for the Restoration of Democracy (CAR) (APRD), Groupe d'action patriotique pour la liberation de Centrafrique (GAPLC), the Movement of Central African Liberators for Justice (MLCJ), the Front démocratique Centrafricain (FDC), and Union of Republican Forces (UFR).

A number of peace agreements have been signed to resolve the conflict between 2007 and 2012. The most important agreement, the Global Peace Accord (signed in Libreville, Gabon, on 21 June 2008), was first signed by the ARPD, UFDR, and FDPC groups. The agreement granted amnesty for any acts perpetrated against the state prior to the agreement, and called for a disarmament and demobilization process to integrate former rebels into society and the regular CAR armed forces.

Other rebel groups signed on to the agreement later, or signed similar agreements with the government (e.g. UFR on 15 December 2008). The only major group not to sign an agreement at the time was the CPJP, which continued its activities and signed a peace agreement with the government on 25 August 2012.

== Timeline ==
=== 2004 ===
In November 2004, at least 20 people were killed in a raid on the remote town of Birao in the north-east of the Central African Republic.

=== 2006 ===
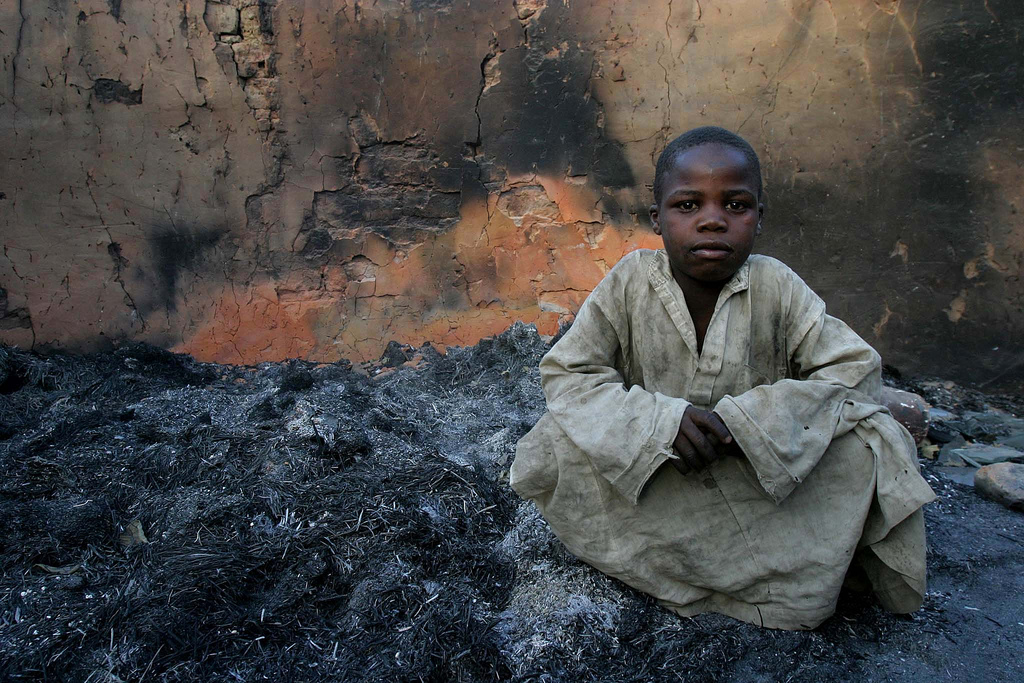
A boy in the town of Birao in northern CAR which was largely burnt down during fighting in 2007.

Thousands of people marched into the capital of the CAR, Bangui, on November 8, and pleaded for the government's troops to confront the UFDR. Twenty members of the government were killed, and only three of the rebels died in this attack.

It was also confirmed that the UFDR had gained access to several armored vehicles, including a plane that landed in Birao earlier to bring supplies.

On November 13, 2006, a third town in northern CAR, Sam Ouandja, was seized by the UFDR. Just three days later, claims stated that a fourth town, Ouadda, had been captured by the rebels. When the 20,000 residents of the city heard that the UFDR was going to capture the town, between 5,000 and 10,000 of those people fled, mostly to the neighboring cities of Bambari and Bangui.

The UFDR were reportedly planning to take over the city of Bria, though rumours also supported that an additional attack may occur in Ndele. In December 2006, Chadian troops in three army trucks attacked Bémal, located next to Bétoko, firing randomly at the population and taking 32 cows from the village, as well as farming implements and sacks of peanuts.

=== 2007 ===
The FDPC's Abdoulaye Miskine signed a peace agreement with the government on 2 February 2007 in Syrte. The agreement called for a cessation of hostilities, the billeting of FDPC fighters and their integration with FACA, the liberation of political prisoners, and the integration of FDPC into government.

After French Mirage jets bombed the UFDR headquarters in Birao, the UFDR and the CAR government signed the Birao Peace Agreement on 1 April 2007. This agreement provides for an amnesty for the UFDR, its recognition as a political party, and the integration of its fighters into the national army. The remaining rebel groups continued fighting the government.

In August 2007 Miskine was appointed as a presidential adviser. Miskine rejected the appointment, saying that the government had violated the Syrte agreement, in particular that it would fail to protect him from prosecution by the International Criminal Court. The Court had started investigating numerous war crimes that allegedly occurred during Bozize's 2002-03 coup attempt against the Patasse government, in which Miskine had been a top aide.

=== 2008 ===
On 9 May 2008 the APRD signed a cease fire and peace agreement with the government in Libreville. The agreement was completed under the auspices of an ad hoc committee of CEMAC led by President Omar Bongo of Gabon. Jean Jacques Demafouth signed on behalf of the APRD and DDR minister Cyriaque Gonda on behalf of the government. A six-person board was established to monitor the implementation of the agreement's terms.

The APRD agreement paved the way for further peace talks. On 21 June 2008 the FDPC joined the APRD and UFDR in signing the Libreville Comprehensive Peace Agreement, which reiterated and extended the provisions of the previous two agreements.

On 25 August 2008 the CPJP finally acceded to the Libreville comprehensive agreement.

=== 2011 ===
The CPJP and UFDR continued to fight over control of artisanal diamond fields in western CAR, especially around Bria. In April the CPJP announced that it was ready to end fighting, but made the initiation of peace talks conditional on a clarification by the government of the status of former CPJP head Charles Massi, who had been missing and presumed to have been killed in a government prison. After intensified government and international mediation efforts, the CPJP signed a ceasefire with the government on June 12. Violence soon resumed and more than 50 deaths were reported in September 2011. On 8 October the CPJP and the UFDR (now aligned with the government) signed a peace agreement in Bangui, calling for the demilitarization of Bria.

=== 2012 ===
On 10 December 2012, the conflict restarted with rebel groups accusing President Bozizé of violating the terms of their earlier agreement. The new rebel coalition, known as Séléka, overthrew Bozizé and took the capital, Bangui, on 24 March 2013, and rebel leader Michel Djotodia declared himself President of the Central African Republic. The war ended.

== Human rights violations and crimes ==
In every case of rebellion, there are abuses, I cannot deny that, there are abuses.

- CAR President François Bozizé

According to the Human Rights Watch (HRW), hundreds of civilians were killed, more than 10,000 houses burned and approximately 212,000 persons have fled their homes to live in desperate conditions deep in the bush in northern Central African Republic.

== Aftermath ==
Further negotiations resulted in an agreement in 2008 for reconciliation, a unity government and local elections in 2009 and parliamentary and presidential elections in 2010; the new government was formed in January 2009.

== See also ==
- 2013 Central African Republic coup d'état
- Chadian Civil War (2005–2010)
- War in Darfur
- List of wars 2003–present
