= Battle of Bangui (2013) =

Central African Republic Civil War battle

- Part of Central African Republic Civil War
| Date | 23–24 March 2013 |
| Location | Bangui central African Republic |
| Result | Séléka victory: Séléka took control of Bangui; South Africa military withdrawal; Michel Djotodia declared himself president |

Belligerents
| Central African Republic; South Africa | (Central African Republic) Séléka |

Commanders and leaders
| (Central African Republic) François Bozizé (surrendered) (South Africa) Col. William Dixon | (Central African Republic) Michel Djotodia (Central African Republic) Issa Issaka Aubin (Central African Republic) Arda Hakouma |

Units involved
| (South Africa) 5 Special Forces Regiment (South Africa) 1 Parachute Battalion (South Africa) 7 Medical Battalion Group | (Central African Republic) CPJP (Central African Republic) UFDR |

Strength
| (South Africa) 200 soldiers (Central African Republic) 2,000 soldiers (not present) | (Central African Republic) 5,000 – 7,000 soldiers |

Casualties and losses
| 13 dead and 27 wounded, 2 later died in the military hospital in South Africa | (Central African Republic) 500–800 killed, 1,000s wounded |

The Battle of Bangui occurred in March 2013, during the ongoing Central African Republic Civil War, and resulted in Séléka taking power in the Central African Republic. With the Central African Armed Forces and international soldiers absent, most of the resistance was raised by South African soldiers.

== Background ==
On 18 March 2013, the rebels, having taken over Gambo and Bangassou, threatened to take up arms again if their demands for the release of political prisoners, the integration of their forces into the national army and for South African soldiers to leave the country, were not met within 72 hours. Three days later, they took control of the towns of Damara and Bossangoa.

== Battle ==
On 23 March Séléka rebels entered Bangui's outskirts. At 19:00 Christian Narkoyo, spokesman of Séléka, announced that rebel forces had crossed the PK12 neighbourhood with little resistance. Rebels also cut electricity from city by turning off Bouali power plant. In reaction to rebel advancements, French forces secured Bangui airport. At 8:15 on 24 March fighting erupted in the city centre. At 8:48 Djouma Narkoyo announced that rebels had captured the presidential palace and that President François Bozizé had fled. By 12:00 it was announced that the rebels controlled the entire city with only some pockets of resistance remaining. On 18:31 Michel Djotodia declared himself new President of the country.

== Allegations of Chadian involvement ==
Séléka reportedly enjoyed the support of Chadian president Idriss Déby, who had struck a deal with the group that Chadian agents would get hold of key posts in the Central African state apparatus after a takeover. Thus, according to a number of observers, the 2013 coup occurred with financial and logistic support from Chad. However, Déby categorically denied these allegations.
