= Abakar Sabone =

Central African rebel leader

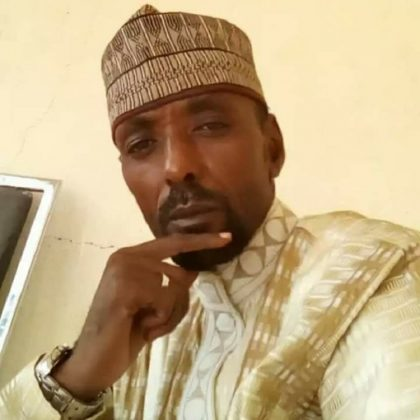

Minister of Tourism and Craft Industry
- In office 3 February 2013 – 31 March 2018
- President: François Bozizé; Michel Djotodia
- Prime Minister: Nicolas Tiangaye
- Preceded by: Sylvie Annick Mazoungou
- Succeeded by: Mahamat Yacoub

Personal details
- Born: 1 January 1966 (age 60) Carnot or Boda

Abakar Sabone (also spelled Sabon) is a politician of Central African Republic. Previously he was the leader of the Movement of Central African Liberators for Justice rebel group during the Central African Republic Bush War.

== Early life and career ==
Born on 1 January 1966 in Carnot or Boda to a Chadian father and Central African mother, he was the former FACA captain. Sabone worked for Bozizé from 2002–2003 to oust Ange-Félix Patassé. He was the main architect behind the rebels taking control of Bangui on 15 March 2003. After Bozizé managed to topple Patasse, Sabone was appointed as special representative for the Ministry of Defense in January 2004.

== Rebellion ==
As special representative for the Ministry of Defense, Bozize asked Sabonee to go to France to mediate the conflict. As he arrived in France, he discovered that Bozizé had sent his Presidential Guard to assassinate him. He managed to escape the assassination attempt. Due to this incident, he decided to resist against Bozizé by establishing MLCJ.

In 2006, three Bozize's opposition groups formed an armed coalition, UFDR, and Sabone was appointed as the UFDR spokesman. He demanded Muslims to have more power in the government and establish an inclusive government where all factions could join. Sabone also called for a Muslim to be appointed as a Prime Minister.

On 25 November 2006, along with Michel Djotodia, Sabone was arrested in Cotonou. They were released in February 2008. Afterward, Sabone became Bozize's advisor on disarmament, demobilization, and reintegration (DDR) on 13 January 2011. In May 2011, he resigned as the leader of MLCJ and advisor to Bozize to retire. He appointed MLCJ chief of staff, Abator Tidjani, as the head of MLCJ. However, the appointment of Tidjani was contested by Adoum Rakiss. Due to the MLCJ's internal conflict, Sabone rejoined MLCJ and became the leader of MLCJ in October 2011, replacing Abator Tidjani.

== Seleka Government ==
On 3 February 2013, Bozize appointed Sabone as a minister of tourism and craft industry. Three months later, he founded a political party, Parti de nouvelle generation (PNG). As French deployed its troops to the Central African Republic in December 2013 under Operation Sangaris, claiming on behalf of Central African Muslim and ex-Seleka, Sabonee issued an ultimatum to French either the political agreement is reached or secession of the country between the north and the south if there was not political consensus. His remark was condemned by Nicolas Tiangaye. However, he later apologized for his statement that called for the partition in February 2014 during an interview by Radio France Internationale.

== Post-Seleka ==
On 23 July 2014, he signed a cease-fire agreement on behalf of the MLCJ. However, he refused to accept Bangui Forum's proposals for peace in May 2015. Instead, he waged war against the central government. Saboune announced the creation of a group named Sursaut patriotique pour le redressement national (SPRN) on 28 January 2020.

In December 2020, CPC was founded and Saboune was appointed group spokesman. Central African government issued an arrest warrant on Saboune on 25 January 2021 for undermining the state authority and the integrity of the national territory. Saboune resigned from his position as CPC spokesman on 12 January 2022.

Saboune announced his support to Faustin-Archange Touadéra on 12 August 2022 and applied for renewal of his Central African Republic passport. However, Toudera's party, MCU, did not welcome his support. Furthermore, Saboune also received death threats from Arthur Piri and Ghislain Djorie if he returned to Bangui.

Along with Mahamat Al-Khatim, ANS arrested Sabone on 10 April 2024 for exposing the Chadian government embezzlement of Angolan fund for the Central African warlord who resided in Chad. Chadian authorities released him on the first week of March 2025.

== Personal life ==
Saboune's niece was married to Mahamat Déby. He belongs to the baggara tribe.
