= Um Dukhun =

Village in Sudan

Um Dukhun أم دخن
- Town
- Location of Um Dukhun in Sudan
- Coordinates: 11°07′24″N 22°57′44″E
- Country: Sudan
- State: Central Darfur
- Time zone: UTC+2 (CAT)

Um Dukhun is a town in Central Darfur, Sudan, near the border of Chad.

== History ==
On 1 December 2020, the Misseriya Arabs militia from Um Dukhun attacked Boromata due to the ethnic tensions between Misseriya and Goula amid the Central African Republic Civil War. On 30 April 2024, Chadian forces reportedly attacked the RSF-held border town of Um Dukhun.
