= François Bozizé =

President of the Central African Republic from 2003 to 2013

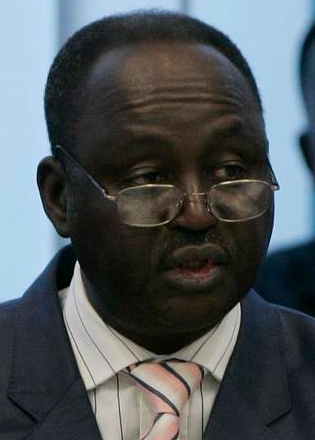
- Bozizé in 2007

6th President of the Central African Republic
- In office 15 March 2003 – 24 March 2013
- Prime Minister: Abel Goumba; Célestin Gaombalet; Élie Doté; Faustin-Archange Touadéra; Nicolas Tiangaye
- Vice President: Abel Goumba (2003–2005)
- Preceded by: Ange-Félix Patassé
- Succeeded by: Michel Djotodia

Minister of Defense
- In office 1979–1981

Personal details
- Born: François Bozizé Yangouvonda; 14 October 1946 (age 80) Mouila, French Equatorial Africa (now Gabon)
- Party: National Convergence "Kwa Na Kwa"
- Spouse: Monique Bozizé
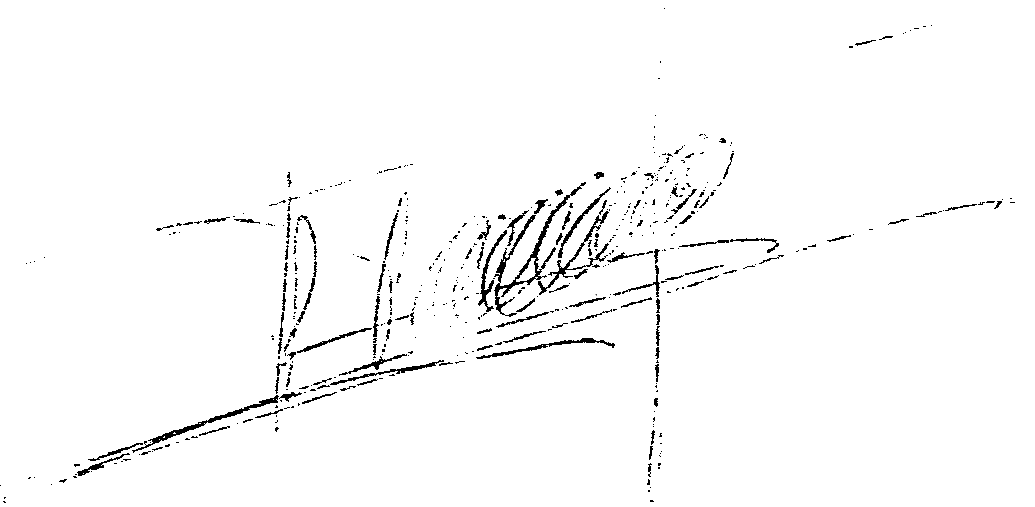
- Signature

François Bozizé Yangouvonda (born 14 October 1946) is a Central African politician who was President of the Central African Republic from 2003 to 2013. He was the only Central African president born in modern-day Gabon.

Bozizé rose to become a high-ranking army officer in the 1970s, under the rule of Jean-Bédel Bokassa. After Bokassa was ousted, Bozizé served in the government as Minister of Defense from 1979 to 1981 and as Minister of Information from 1981 to 1982. He participated in a failed 1982 coup attempt against President André Kolingba and subsequently fled the country. Years later, he served as Army Chief of Staff under President Ange-Félix Patassé, but began a rebellion against Patassé in 2001.

Bozizé's forces captured the capital, Bangui, in March 2003, while Patassé was outside the country, and Bozizé took power, ushering in a transitional period of government. He won the March–May 2005 presidential election in a second round of voting, and was re-elected in the January 2011 presidential election, winning the vote in the first round.

In December 2012, the CAR was plunged into an uprising by rebel forces who condemned the Bozizé government for not honoring peace agreements after the Central African Bush War in 2007. On 24 March 2013, Bozizé fled to Cameroon via the Democratic Republic of the Congo after the rebel forces attacked Bangui and took control of the presidential palace. There, he was housed by Paul Biya, president of Cameroon. On 29 May 2013, an international arrest warrant was issued against Bozizé by the Central African Republic.

== Early life and Kolingba's rule ==
Bozizé was born in the present-day nation of Gabon, a member of the Gbaya people, and attended a military officers' training college in the Central African province of Bouar. He became a second lieutenant in 1969 and a captain in 1975. He was appointed Brigadier General by the Emperor of Central Africa Bokassa I (Jean-Bédel Bokassa) in 1978, after he beat a French noncommissioned officer who had been disrespectful to the Emperor. With General Josyhat Mayomokala, Bozizé ordered military personnel to attack young demonstrators who were asking for their parents' arrears. After Bokassa was ousted by David Dacko in 1979, Bozizé was appointed Minister of Defense after an operation that the French army used to overthrow Bokassa (Operation Barracuda).

Following Dacko's ouster by André Kolingba in September 1981, Bozizé was appointed Minister of Information, but fled to the north of the country with 100 soldiers after his involvement in a failed coup attempt led by Ange-Félix Patassé on 3 March 1982, in which he accused Kolingba of treason and proclaimed the change of power on Radio Bangui. He then obtained refuge in France. During much of the 1980s, he also lived in Benin, where he became a devout follower of the Celestial Church of Christ. Bozizé was arrested in Cotonou in July 1989, and imprisoned and tortured. He was put on trial by Kolingba on charges of helping the coup d'état in May but was acquitted on 24 September 1991 and released from prison on 1 December. He then sought refuge in France, where he remained for nearly two years.

Under pressure to democratize the government during the 1980s, Kolingba had formed a political party and held a referendum, in which he was elected to a six-year term in office as president. After the fall of the Berlin Wall, internal and external pressures eventually forced Kolingba to adopt the beginnings of a democratic approach. In March 1991, he named Édouard Frank Prime Minister but allowed him virtually no power. He also established a commission to revise the constitution in order to promote pluralism.

As a result, the donor community severely restricted aid flows pending movement towards democracy putting the country into a vicious cycle in which it could not obtain the resources to pay for an election which would legitimize it sufficiently to obtain a flow of aid. When he was pressured by the international community, via a group of locally represented international donors called GIBAFOR (France, USA, Germany, Japan, EU, World Bank and UN), including a very vocal and eloquent US ambassador to the Central African Republic, Daniel H. Simpson, to hold fair elections. They were assisted by the UN Electoral Assistance Unit and monitored by international observers in 1992 but a lot of the resources came from France. Kolingba had the 1992 election sabotaged as he discovered he was not expected to win the vote and so declared the election invalid getting the Constitutional Council cancel it. Under continued pressure from the donor group the election was rescheduled for September 1993.

In the 1993 election, Bozizé ran for the presidency as an independent, receiving 12,159 votes, 1.5% of the total votes cast. Patassé, Abel Goumba and Kolingba received 37.32%, 21.68% and 12.10% of the vote, respectively, but since none of the candidates obtained a majority, a run-off election between the top two candidates — Patassé and Goumba — was held. Patassé defeated Goumba by a 53.49%–46.51% vote and was elected president of the Central African Republic.

== Relations with Patassé ==
For many years Bozizé was considered a supporter of Patassé and helped him suppress army mutinies in 1996 and 1997. Bozizé was named the Armed Forces Chief of Staff. Bozizé showed no activity against Patassé and frequently crushed revolts against the president.

On 28 May 2001, a coup was attempted against Patassé and defeated with the help of Libyan troops and Congolese rebels of the Movement for the Liberation of Congo. Afterwards, Bozizé's loyalty was questioned, and in late October 2001 he was dismissed as Army Chief of Staff. Fighting erupted when the government tried to arrest Bozizé on 3 November; after five days of this, government forces aided by Libyan troops captured the barracks where Bozizé was based, and Bozizé fled north to Chad.

Fighting between government forces and Bozizé's rebels continued during 2002. From 25 to 31 October, his forces unsuccessfully attacked the capital, Bangui; soldiers of the Congolese MLC, which again came to Patassé's aid, were accused of looting and rape.

This period was marked by tensions between Chad and Patassé's government. Patassé's ruling party accused Chadian president Idriss Déby of destabilizing the Central African Republic by supporting Bozizé with men and equipment.

== 2003 coup d'état and presidency ==
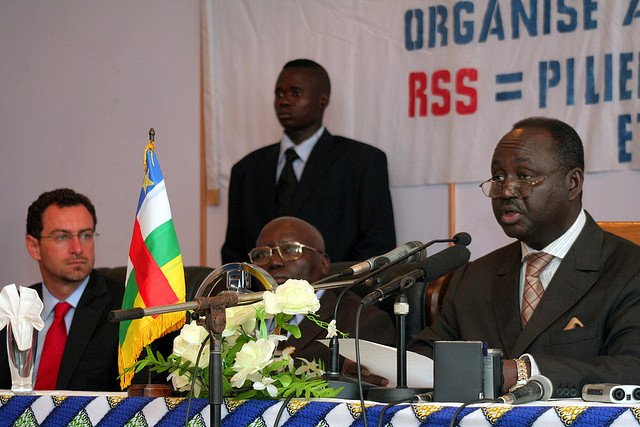
Bozizé at the Security Sector Reform Meeting in Bangui (2008)

On 15 March 2003, Bozizé finally succeeded in seizing power, with his forces entering Bangui unopposed. Patassé was returning from a meeting in Niger at the time, but could not land because Bozizé's forces controlled the airport. Patassé took refuge in Cameroon and then Togo the next year.

On 23 March, Bozizé appointed Abel Goumba as prime minister. In December, he made Goumba Vice-President and appointed Célestin Gaombalet in his place as prime minister. Bozizé suspended the country's 1995 constitution after seizing power, and a new constitution, reportedly similar to the old one, was approved by voters in a referendum on 5 December 2004. After seizing power, Bozizé initially said he would not run in a planned future presidential election, but after the successful constitutional referendum, he announced his intention to stand as a candidate on 11 December:

After thinking thoroughly, and being deeply convinced and keeping in mind the nation's interest, I grasped the deep sense of my people's calls. As a citizen, I'll take my responsibility.

I'll contest the election to achieve the task of rebuilding the country, which is dear to me and according to your wish.

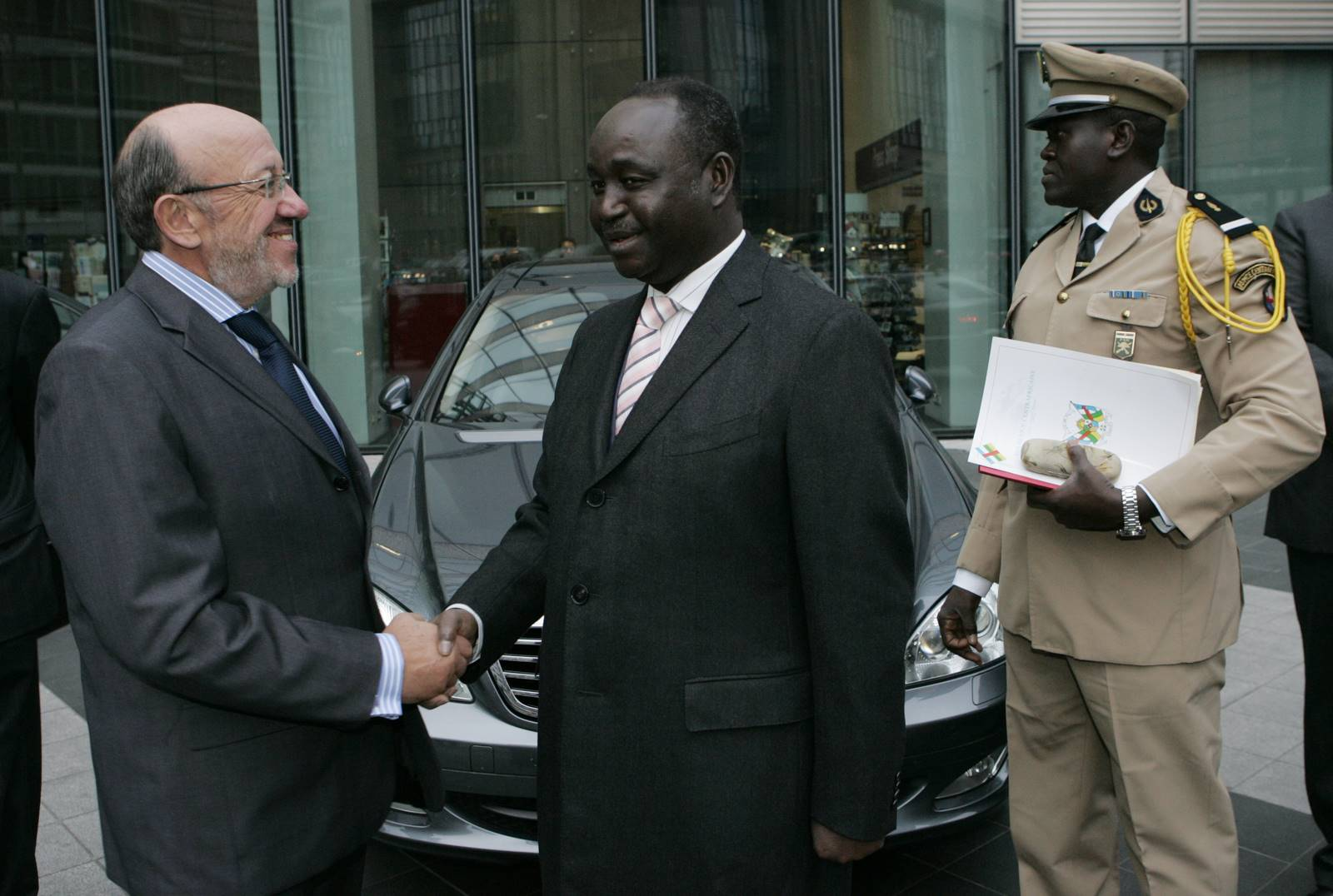
Bozizé in Brussels, c 2007.

In December 2004, a constitution was approved in a referendum which would allow a semi presidential system and a two term limit.

That same month on 30 December 2004, Bozizé was one of five candidates approved to run in the presidential election scheduled for early 2005. On 4 January 2005, Bozizé announced that three initially excluded candidates would also be allowed to run, although former president Patassé was not included in either group. In late January, it was announced that more candidates would be permitted to run in the election, bringing the total to 11 and leaving only Patassé barred. The elections were also delayed by one month from the previously scheduled date of 13 February to 13 March.

Bozizé placed first in the 13 March election, taking just under 43% of the vote according to official results. He faced Patassé's last prime minister, Martin Ziguélé, in a second round of voting; this was held on 8 May and according to official results announced on 24 May, he won with 64.6% of the vote. He was sworn in on 11 June.

The National Assembly authorized Bozizé to rule by decree for three months, from 1 January to 31 March 2006; his prime minister, Élie Doté, said that this period of rule by decree was successful, enabling Bozizé to take measures to streamline the civil service. In addition to being president, Bozizé has been Minister of National Defense since taking power. At the end of the transitional period, he retained the defense portfolio when he appointed a new government under Doté in June 2005, and he also kept it in a September 2006 cabinet reshuffle.

In early 2006, Bozizé's government appeared stable. However, Patassé, who was living in exile in Togo, could not be ruled out as a leader of a future uprising. His supporters reportedly were joining or were prepared to join rebel movements in belief that their leader was still the rightful head of state of the country. Further, members of Kolingba's Yakoma tribe in the south posed a potential threat to Bozizé's government because of their widespread boycott of the second round of the legislative elections. Members of the Yakoma dominate the army. On 13 April 2007, a peace agreement between the government and the UFDR was signed in Birao. The agreement provided for an amnesty for the UFDR, its recognition as a political party, and the integration of its fighters into the army. Further negotiations resulted in an agreement in 2008 for reconciliation, a unity government, and local elections in 2009 and parliamentary and presidential elections in 2010. The new unity government that resulted was formed in January 2009.

Facing a general strike over wage arrears for civil servants in January 2008, Bozizé appointed a new government headed by Faustin-Archange Touadéra, an academic figure who was politically unknown. In that government he kept the defense portfolio, while also appointing his son Francis Bozizé to work under him as Minister-Delegate. Bozizé's sister, Yvonne M'Boïssona, who had been Minister of Tourism, was reappointed to the government as Minister of Water, Forests, Hunting, Fishing, and the Environment. His nephew, Sylvain Ndoutingai, served as Minister of State of Mines, Energy, and Water Resources.

In February 2010, Kolingba died in France. In early March, Bozizé presided over his burial ceremony in Bangui. The same week, Bozizé signed a presidential decree setting the date for the next presidential election which was to be held on 25 April 2010.

The elections were first postponed to 16 May, and then indefinitely. The parliament was asked to pass a change to the constitution allowing the President to continue its mandate until elections could be organized. Some sources saw the delay in elections as a constitutional coup, and did not expect elections to take place anytime soon. However, elections were held in January and March 2011. Bozizé and his party both won in the elections.

In December 2010, Bozizé issued a decree which officially rehabilitated Bokassa, stating the former military dictator had "given a great deal for humanity".

=== Central African Bush War ===
Shortly after Bozizé seized power, the Central African Republic Bush War began with the rebellion by the Union of Democratic Forces for Unity (UFDR), led by Michel Djotodia. This quickly escalated into major fighting during 2004. The UFDR rebel forces consisted of five allies, the Groupe d'action patriotique pour la liberation de Centrafrique (GAPLC), the Convention of Patriots for Justice and Peace (CPJP), the People's Army for the Restoration of Democracy (APRD), the Movement of Central African Liberators for Justice (MLCJ), and the Front démocratique Centrafricain (FDC).

On 17 April 2004, security forces reportedly killed eight "Liberators," Chadian combatants who had helped the President seize power in 2003. Prior to the killings, the Chadian combatants had staged violent demonstrations, looted approximately 75 homes in a Bangui suburb, and demanded payment from President Bozize for their support during the rebellion that allowed him to depose former President Patasse. During the year, the President reportedly paid each Liberator $1,000 (504,000 CFA francs) before they ostensibly returned to Chad.

During the first year, many parts of the country, and the Government was significantly affected by insecurity and the threat of conflict. In April 2004, the Government deployed 200 soldiers to fight banditry in the northern and northwest provinces, including Kemo and Ouham-Pende. Some human rights observers said they believed that many of the armed groups were the same rebels and mercenaries, including Chadian ex-combatants, who helped Bozize seize power in the 2003 coup; these observers said that because Bozize had been unable to pay the ex-combatants.

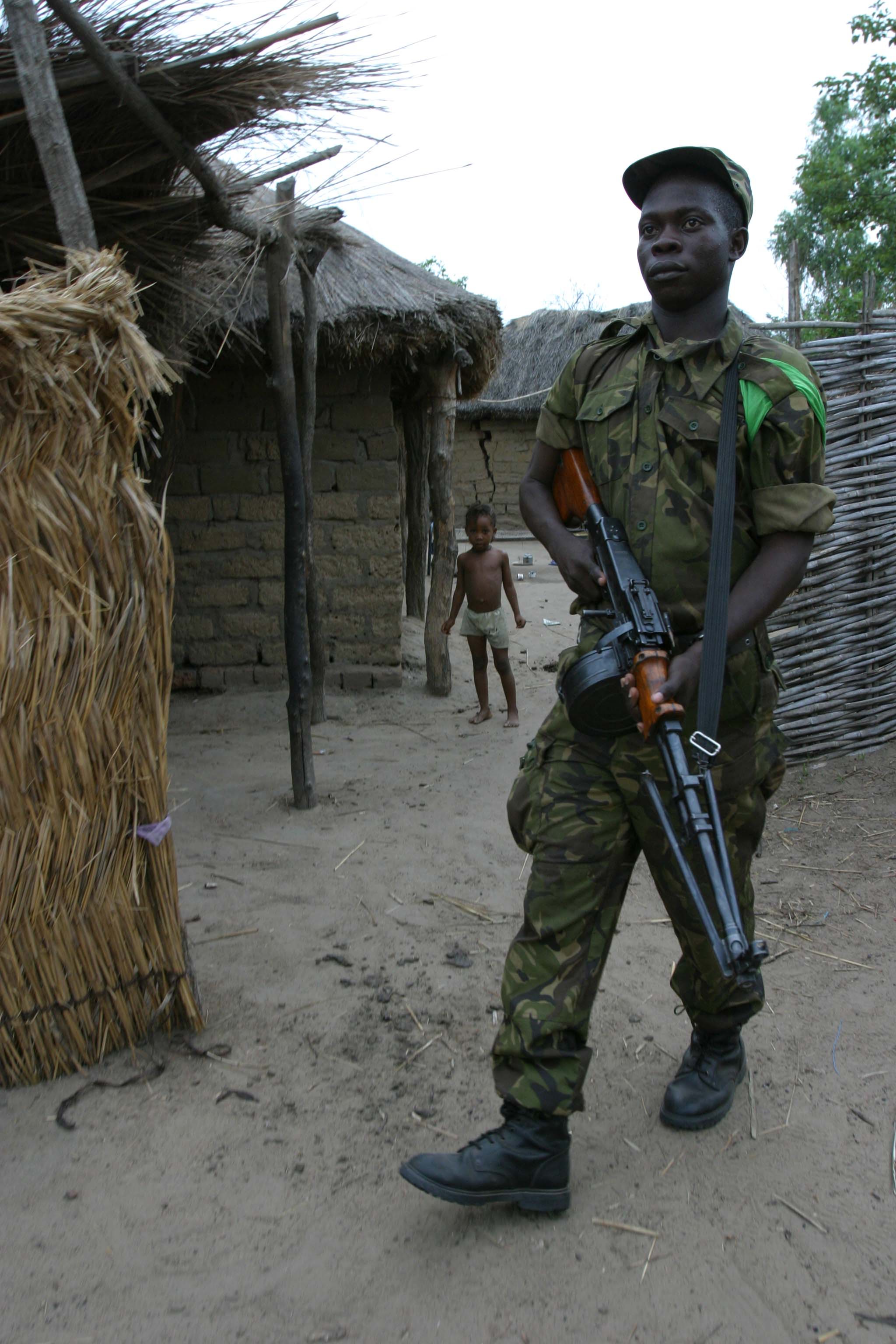
Soldier in the streets of Birao where the war began.

Between 2006 and 2007 President Francois Bozize was holding a national dialogue with rebel groups and political foes to try to end the fighting. He has signed peace pacts with two rebel groups but instability was rising.

Further negotiations resulted in an agreement in 2008 for reconciliation, a unity government and local elections in 2009 and parliamentary and presidential elections in 2010.

During this war many were killed, houses burnt, villages destroyed and many others such as no drinking water. Around 10,000 people were displaced because of the civil unrest.

In every case of rebellion, there are abuses, I cannot deny that, there are abuses.– François Bozizé

Bozizé was instrumental in creating the Anti-balaka militias that would later proceed to carry out massacres against mainly Muslim citizens.

=== Corruption under Bozizé ===
Even though the Central African Republic has many minerals and an abundance of arable land, many of its inhabitants live in poverty. Male life expectancy went down during Bozizé's presidency. In 2009, the CAR had a GDP per capita of just 456$. This was tied to corruption which further increased under Bozizé's rule, as well as diamond smuggling.

After his deposal, Bozizé was implied in a major corruption case (in which the French politician Patrick Balkany was also implied as a negotiator): he had taken millions in bribes, real estate and luxury cars in exchange for the exploits of the French multinational mining company Areva in Bakouma.

=== Foreign relations ===
- Chad - After Bozizé took power, he and Chadian president Idriss Déby (who had already been accused of involvement in the 2003 coup) went on to establish a strong political relationship, aiming to "prevent closer cooperation between rebel groups on both sides of the border". In April 2006, Chadian rebels named the United Front for Democratic Change that were based in Darfur used the CAR as a route to attack Chad. Bozizé responded by closing the border between Sudan and Central African Republic.
- France - Since 1998, France had had no military presence in the CAR. After the ascent of Bozizé, the military ties with France were restored by sending the Foreign Legion general Jean-Pierre Pérez - who was also connected to the private military company EHC - to be Bozizé's counseller.

=== Religious policy ===
Bozizé, a follower of the West African Celestial Church of Christ, had already been accused by Patassé of using the church as a "recruitment arm" for his rebellion prior to the 2003 coup. He became the evangelical church's main leader in the CAR in May 2012.

According to anthropologist Sandra Fancello, Bozizé's presidency was marked by a "warrior rhetoric" that could be traced to the influence of the Celestial Church. He employed belligerent language against Muslims and other religious or political "enemies", which furthered the stigmatization of the Central African Muslim community. Certain factions of the Anti-balaka were also connected to the Celestial Church.

== Civil War leadership ==
On 10 December 2012, the Séléka CPSK-CPJP-UFDR (Séléka means coalition) seized the towns of N'Délé, Sam Ouandja and Ouadda. Rebels fought with government and allied CPJP troops for over an hour before securing the town of N'Délé. On 27 December, Bozizé requested international assistance to help with the rebellion, in particular from France and the United States. French President François Hollande rejected the plea, saying that the 250 French troops stationed at Bangui M'Poko International Airport are there "in no way to intervene in the internal affairs".

On 11 January 2013, a ceasefire agreement was signed in Libreville, Gabon. The rebels dropped their demand for Bozizé to resign, but he had to appoint a new prime minister from the opposition party by 18 January 2013. On 13 January, Bozizé signed a decree that removed Prime Minister Touadéra from power, as part of the agreement with the rebel coalition. On 17 January, Nicolas Tiangaye was appointed prime minister.

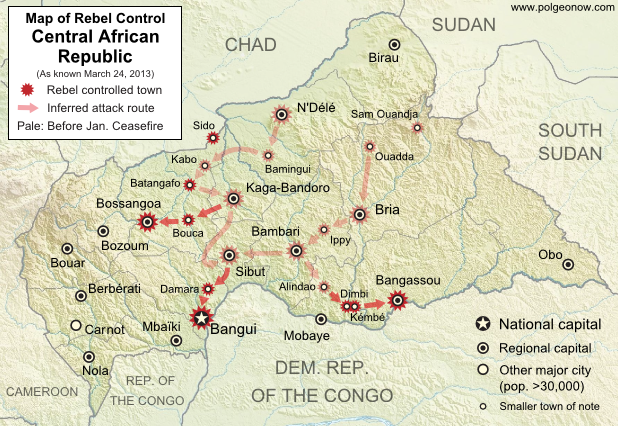
Map of Seleka rebellion.

By 22 March, however, the rebels had renewed their advance, accusing Bozizé of failing to honor the January ceasefire agreement. They took towns throughout the Central African Republic, including Damara and Bossangoa. They advanced to within 22 kilometers of Bangui, but were halted with an aerial assault from an attack helicopter. However, Nelson N'Djadder, presumed spokesman for the rebels, claimed that they shot down the helicopter.

On 24 March, rebel forces heavily attacked Bangui and took control of major structures, including the presidential palace. Bozizé's family fled across the river to the Democratic Republic of the Congo and then to Yaoundé, the capital of Cameroon, where he was granted temporary refuge. Subsequently, he requested that Benin grant him political asylum.

== Exile and elections ==
Bozizé was forced to flee the country after being overthrown by Djotodia in a coup d'état in 2013. While in exile, Bozizé fled to Cameroon via the Democratic Republic of the Congo after the rebel forces attacked Bangui and took control of the presidential palace. There, he was housed by Paul Biya, president of Cameroon. A warrant was placed for him and was transmitted on May 30, 2013. Bozize was accused of a string of arrests, abductions and arbitrary detentions as well as the destruction of nearly 4,000 homes.

Kwa Na Kwa announced on 10 August 2015 that Bozizé would return to the country and stand as a candidate in the October 2015 presidential election. On 8 December 2015, the Constitutional Court announced the list of approved presidential candidacies. Bozizé, who was still in exile, was barred from standing. Officially, he was excluded on the grounds that he was not registered on the voter list and because he had agreed not to run again as part of the peace agreement in January 2013. Gunfire was subsequently reported in parts of Bangui, as his supporters reacted angrily to the news. The KNK said that Bozizé's exclusion was "the result of internal and external pressure", with many of his supporters alleging that the French government was involved in the decision.

At the end of 2019 Bozizé returned to CAR and announced his presidential candidacy for upcoming elections. However, on 3 December 2020 the Constitutional Court of CAR ruled that Bozizé did not satisfy the "good morality" requirement for candidates because of an international warrant and United Nations sanctions against him for alleged assassinations, torture and other crimes. The government then accused Bozizé of plotting a coup.

On 22 September 2023, Bozizé, who fled to Chad before moving to Guinea-Bissau, was sentenced in absentia to life imprisonment with hard labor by the Bangui Court of Appeal for unspecified crimes. On 30 April 2024, the Special Criminal Court in Bangui issued an international arrest warrant against him on charges of human rights abuses committed during his presidency, including in Bossembélé, which was dubbed as his "personal prison". However, Guinea-Bissau, where Bozizé is currently living, does not allow for extradition. At least 25 international arrest warrants have been issued against Bozizé by the SCC.

== Notes ==
Political offices
Preceded by Ange-Félix Patassé	President of the Central African Republic; 2003–2013	Succeeded by Michel Djotodia
