= Monique Bozizé =

Central African politician

First Lady of the Central African Republic
- In office 15 March 2003 – 24 March 2013
- President: François Bozizé
- Preceded by: Angèle Patassé
- Succeeded by: Chantal Djotodia

Member of the National Assembly
- In office 2005 – 24 March 2013
- Constituency: Bimbo II

Personal details
- Party: National Convergence "Kwa Na Kwa"
- Spouse: François Bozizé

Monique Bozizé (born ?) is a Central African politician who was First Lady of the Central African Republic from 2003 until 2013 as the wife of former President François Bozizé. She was also elected to the National Assembly in the 2005 and 2011 general elections representing the Bimbo II constituency in Ombella-M'Poko prefecture.

Monique Bozizé became the country's First Lady in March 2003 when her husband, François Bozizé, took power in the 2003 Central African Republic coup d'état. Two years later, while holding the position first lady, Monique Bozizé was elected to the National Assembly from the Bimbo II in Ombella-M'Poko, while her husband won the presidential election.

In 2011, First Lady Bozizé won re-election to the National Assembly from the Bimbo II district with 66.29% of the vote in the first round. Her son, Francis Bozizé, was also elected to the National Assembly in 2011 from the northern town of Kabo.

François Bozizé was overthrown in March 2013 during the Central African Republic Civil War. The Bozizé family fled to the Democratic Republic of the Congo and Cameroon before being granted political asylum in Benin.
