= Patriotic Rally for the Renewal of the Central African Republic =

- Rassemblement Patriotique pour le Renouveau de la Centrafrique
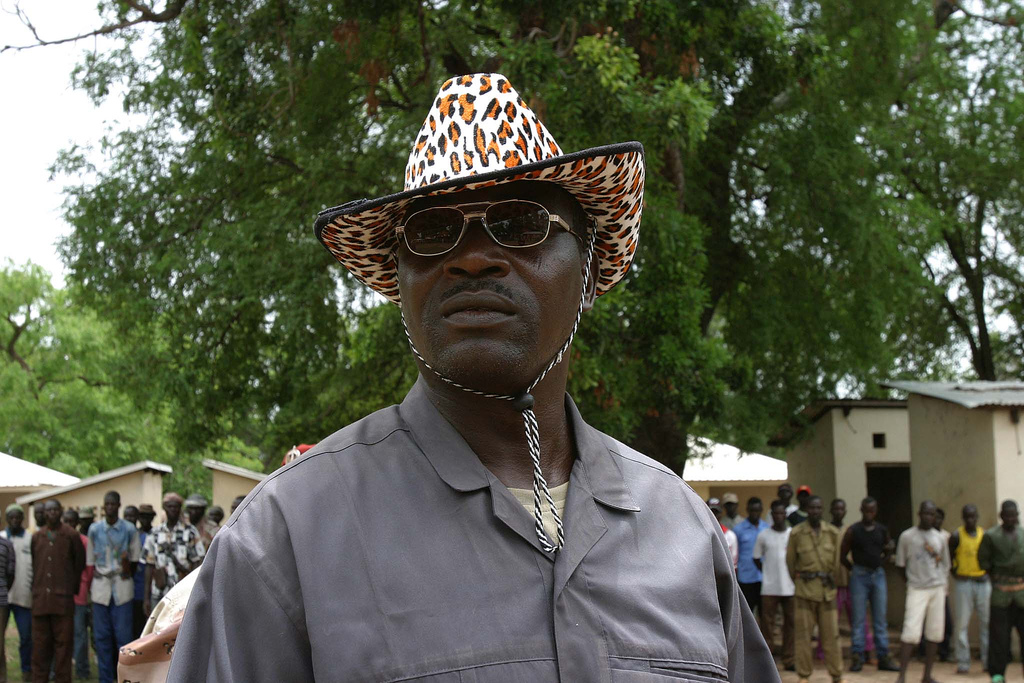
- Damane Zakaria, former leader of RPRC
- Leaders: Damane Zakaria (until 2022); Herbert Gontran Djono Ahaba
- Dates active: 2014–2022
- Split from: Séléka
- Headquarters: Tiringoulou; Bria (until 2021)
- Active regions: Haute-Kotto, Vakaga, Bamingui-Bangoran subprefectures
- Wars: Central African Republic Civil War (2012–present)

Patriotic Rally for the Renewal of the Central African Republic (RPRC, French: Rassemblement Patriotique pour le Renouveau de la Centrafrique) was an armed group in the Central African Republic based in the northern part of the country, in Ouadda and Sam Ouandja in Haute-Kotto and Tiringoulou in Vakaga.

== History ==
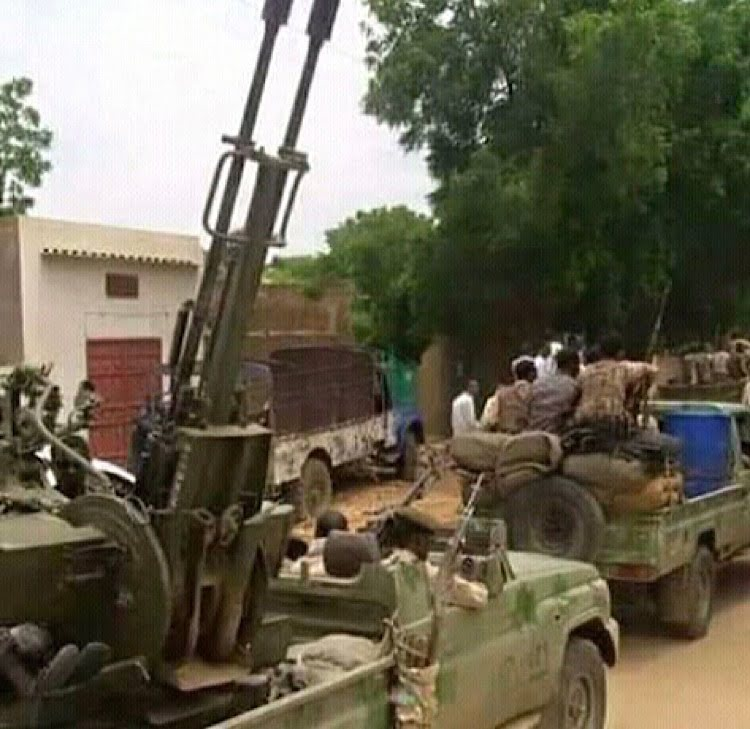
RPRC military vehicle in N'Délé, 11 March 2020

RPRC was formed in November 2014 as a split faction from FPRC armed group. It was initially based in Bria. In October 2016 RPRC created a coalition together with FPRC, MPC and Anti-balaka against UPC. In June 2017, infighting broke out between RPRC and FPRC leading to distancing between those two groups. In May 2018 RPRC formally reconciled with the UPC armed group. As of 2018, RPRC reportedly controlled the Bria-Ouadda road, maintaining checkpoints alongside the road and taxing imports of $1,400 and exports of $25,000.

In February 2019, RPRC was one of the signatories of a peace agreement with the government. On 28 May 2019 a splinter group from RPRC, Party of the Rally of the Central African Nation, was created.

In March 2020, RPRC together with MLCJ attacked N'Délé, a stronghold of FPRC. On 11 March 2020, more than 40 civilians were killed in one attack on N'Délé. On 29 April, RPRC and MLCJ once again attacked N'Délé killing 37 civilians. They were eventually forced to withdraw on 10 May. On 19 May, MINUSCA arrested nine RPRC fighters in N'Délé, including General Azor Kalité, while they were trying to escape to Tirigoulou. They were transferred two days later to Bangui. They have been accused of war crimes and crimes against humanity. On 25 May, MINUSCA arrested two RPRC fighters 16 km from N'Délé followed by another two days later including General Amar.

On 12 February 2022, the group's leader, Damane Zakaria, together with 20 other RPRC fighters, was killed by Russian mercenaries in Ouadda. On 4 December 2022 official dissolution of the group was signed in Bangui.

== See also ==
- 2020 N'Délé clashes
