= Republican Guard (Central African Republic) =

Military unit protecting government officials

- Garde républicaine
- Country: Central African Republic
- Agency: Central African Armed Forces
- Type: Republican guard
- Role: Air assault Anti-tank warfare Artillery observer Bodyguard; Clandestine operation Close-quarters battle Counterinsurgency; Counterterrorism; Covert operation Desert warfare Direct action Domestic security Force protection Hostage rescue Irregular warfare Jungle warfare Maneuver warfare Patrolling; Raiding; Reconnaissance; Special operations Special reconnaissance Urban warfare
- Headquarters: Bangui

The Republican Guard (French: Garde républicaine, or GR), also called the Presidential Guard (French: Garde présidentielle, or PR), a republican guard unit that is nominally part of the Central African Armed Forces (FACA). However, it is directly subordinated to the President of the Central African Republic, for whom it provides security.

== History ==
During the leadership of President François Bozizé, the guard largely consisted of members of his same tribe, "patriots" who helped him seize power during the 2003 coup d'état, and was estimated to number some 800 men. They have been accused of numerous assaults on the civil population, such as terror, aggression, sexual violence. Since the outbreak of the civil war and ethnic violence in 2012 and the overthrow of Bozizé in 2013, many members of the guard have joined the Seleka coalition.

From 2008, they had received training from South African and Sudanese troops, with support from Belgium and Germany, although since then the leadership has been cautious about significantly reforming the guard. Wagner contractors, since 2018, led training for the RG only and avoid training other units in the FACA due to its units being entirely trained by European militaries.

=== Civil War ===
Since the civil war, transitional president Michel Djotodia attempted to reform the presidential guard, which was staffed by his militia. Chinese instructors provided training to the presidential guard and other internal security forces in 2018.

=== Current ===
In May 2019, a unit of the presidential guard was commissioned after being trained by Russian military instructors, the groupement spécial chargé de la protection républicaine (GSPR). The unit, also known as Alpha Group, had its initial operators trained for seven months. The Section d'Appui aux Opérations Spéciale (SAOS) serves as the Republican Guard's main SOF unit trained by Wagner contractors.

== Organization ==
The RG's GSPR does not answer to FACA's General Staff or Parliament as they are under the control of the president. It's mostly made of up of soldiers who hail from the Ngbaka Mandja.

=== Structure ===
The following units are under the RG:

- Republican Guard
  - Alpha One
  - GSPR
  - Support Unit
  - Territorial Infantry Battalion 6
  - Unit 124

== Bibliography ==
- Horn, Col. (retired) Bernd; Ilis-Alm, Col. (retired) Hans, eds. (2024). Force Multiplier: Utilization of SOF from a Small State Perspective (ebook). 17 Wing Winnipeg Publishing Office. ISBN 9780660693637.
