= Boromata =

- Location in the Central African Republic
- Coordinates: 10°5′11″N 21°55′46″E
- Country: Central African Republic
- Prefecture: Vakaga
- Sub-prefecture: Birao
- Commune: Ouandja
- Time zone: UTC + 1

Boromata is a village in the Vakaga Prefecture in the northern Central African Republic.

== History ==
In 1962, Boromata had a population of 309 people.

On 15 March 2008, 13 Chadian Soldiers under the command of the former chief of defense of the UFDR attacked joint UFDR-FACA forces and burned four homes in Boromata. During the attack, the joint forces managed to kill five attackers and capture four. The four prisoners were transferred to Bangui. As a result, 500 people fled to the bush.

=== Central African Republic Civil War (2013-present) ===
On 1 December 2020, the Misseriya Arabs militia from Um Dukhun, Sudan attacked Boromata due to the ethnic tensions between Misseriya and Goula. The attack caused five deaths and 14 injuries. Other than that, the militia razed 1325 homes and 84 shops.

== Economy ==
Near Boromata, there is an oil reserve. In 2011, the government granted CNPC for oil exploration. Within the village, there is one market.

== Demography ==
Goula makes up the majority of the village population.

== Education ==
There is one school in the village.

== Healthcare ==
Boromata has one public health post.

== Notable people ==
- Damane Zakaria, former leader of RPRC
