= Tiringoulou =

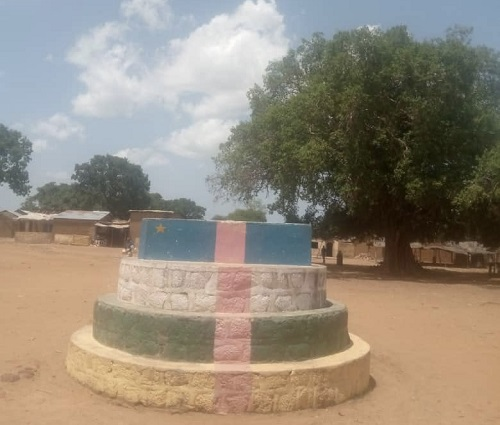
- Tiringoulou roundabout

- Location in the Central African Republic
- Coordinates: 9°33′29″N 22°8′1″E
- Country: Central African Republic
- Prefecture: Vakaga
- Sub-prefecture: Birao
- Commune: Ouandja

Population (2020)
  - Total: 6,875
- Time zone: UTC + 1

Tiringoulou, also spelled Tirigoulou or Tiroungoulou, is a village in the Vakaga Prefecture in the northern Central African Republic.

== History ==
In 1962, Tiringoulou had a population of 341 people.

=== Central African Republic Bush War (2004-2007) ===
On 25 and 26 April 2006, a mysterious Antonov cargo plane landed on Tiringoulou airstrip to unload weapons and 50 armed men. They fled to the surrounding area. The locals alerted the government through radio. In response, Bozize sent Presidential Guard to the village. The Presidential Guard burned houses and attacked locals who wore camouflage uniforms or had a job related to arms-carrying.

LRA attacked the UFDR base and burned several houses in Tiringoulou on 4 October 2010, which caused four LRA fighters and one UFDR member to die. In this attack, LRA kidnapped a girl and forced her to marry an LRA member.

=== Central African Republic Civil War (2012-present) ===
In March 2022, the Wagner Group attacked Tiringoulou and killed 12 people, including FPRC general Baba Amibe. On 25 May they again arrived in the village. In December a government delegation met there with PRNC rebels to negotiate release of kidnaped workers.

CPC captured Tiringoulou on 5 May 2023 by attacking the FACA outpost in the town and killing two soldiers. On 7 May 2023, FACA and MINUSCA recaptured Tiringoulou from CPC.

== Demographics ==
Goula makes up the majority of the village population.

== Economy ==
The village has one market.

== Education ==
Tiringoulou has two primary schools and one secondary school.

== Healthcare ==
Tiringoulou has one health center.

== Notable people ==
- Joseph Zoundeiko, former Head of the Popular Front for the Rebirth of Central African Republic
