= Ouadda =

- Location in Central African Republic
- Coordinates: 8°4′N 22°24′E
- Country: Central African Republic
- Prefecture: Haute-Kotto

Government
  - Sub-Prefect: Ghislain Edgard Stéphane Yonaba
  - Mayor: Michel Pouillaude Mapouka

Ouadda is a town located in the Central African Republic prefecture of Haute-Kotto.

== History ==
Around November 2006, UFDR captured Ouadda. On 1 December 2006, FACA recaptured the town after facing a fierce battle with UFDR.

On 10 December 2012, the rebels from Séléka seized Ouadda, as well as weapons left by fleeing soldiers. In 2021 Ouadda was under the control of ex-Séléka Rassemblement patriotique pour le renouveau de la Centrafrique (RPRC). On 12 February 2022 Russian mercenaries from Wagner Group attacked Ouadda killing RPRC leader Damane Zakaria together with 20 of his men. On 11 May 2022 FPRC and UPC rebels took control of Ouadda. Five soldiers were killed, six injured and four captured by rebels. In October 2023 rebels withdrew from Ouadda following increased presence of MINUSCA peacekeepers.

FACA and MINUSCA forces seized Ouadda at the end of May 2024. An unknown armed group stormed FACA position in the town on 14 May 2025.
