= Sam Ouandja =

- Location in Central African Republic
- Coordinates: 8°31′41″N 23°14′41″E
- Country: Central African Republic
- Prefecture: Haute-Kotto
- Sub-prefecture: Ouadda
- Commune: Ouandja Kotto

Sam Ouandja is a town located in the Central African Republic prefecture of Haute-Kotto near the border with Sudan. It has historically served as important arms trafficking hub for armed groups in Central African Republic. Artisanal diamond mining is also active in the commune.

== History ==
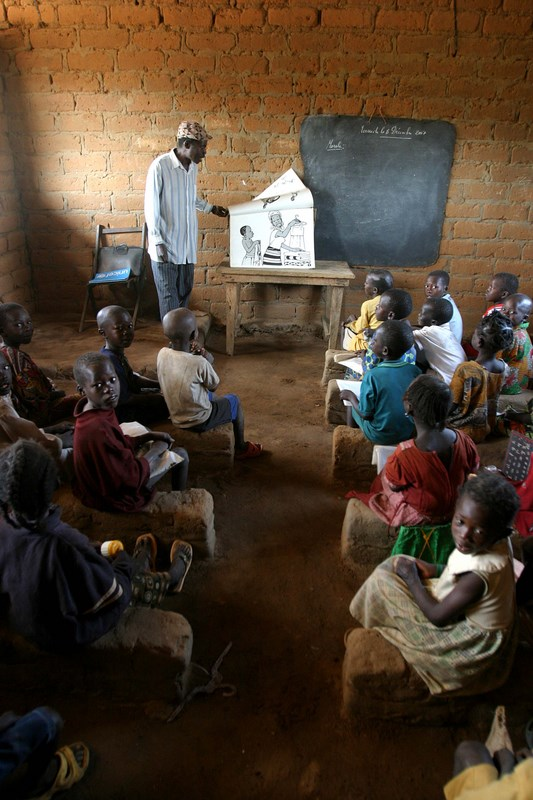
Classroom in Sam Ouandja

Since 2006 Sam Ouandja has been under control of different rebel groups led by Damane Zakaria, including Union of Democratic Forces for Unity (UFDR), Séléka and most recently Rassemblement patriotique pour le renouveau de la Centrafrique (RPRC). It was captured by UFDR on 13 November 2006. The town has been used by different groups for trafficking weapons from Sudan, including pistols, rifles, machine guns, rocket launchers and ammunition.

In December 2012, along with N'Délé and Ouadda, Seleka captured Sam Ouandja.

On 18 August 2022, rebels withdrew from Sam Ouandja following arrival of MINUSCA peacekeepers.

PRNC attacked Sam Ouandja on 4 July 2023. Six people were killed: the gendarmerie brigade commander, two gendarmerie personnel, two teenagers, and one rebel.

== Healthcare ==
Sam Ouandja has one health center.
