= Movement of Central African Liberators for Justice =

- Le Mouvement des libérateurs centrafricains pour la justice
- Leaders: Abakar Sabon; Toumou Deya Gilbert
- Dates active: 2008–2022
- Split from: UFDR
- Group: Kara people
- Headquarters: Birao
- Active regions: Northern part of Central African Republic
- Wars: Central African Republic Civil War (2012–present)
- Website: Coordination générale MLCJ Birao

Movement of Central African Liberators for Justice (MLCJ, French: Le Mouvement des libérateurs centrafricains pour la justice) was a rebel group in the Central African Republic led by Abakor Sabone. The group had splintered from the Union of Democratic Forces for Unity and was involved in fighting in the Central African Republic Bush War. The group mainly drew from the Kara ethnic group.

== History ==
In September 2019 they gained control of Birao after a battle with the FPRC. On 14 October MLCJ took control of Am Dafok. It was recaptured by FPRC on 16 December. On 26 January 2020, the MLCJ attacked Bria, capturing more than 60% of the city after 24 hours of clashes with the FPRC. On 17 February, FPRC fighters tried to recapture Bira by attacking local MINUSCA forces. Their attack was repelled and 12 fighters were killed. On 9 March around 100 MLCJ fighters participated in RPRC attack on N'Délé. On 29 April, the RPRC and MLCJ attacked a central market in N'Délé killing at least 37 people. On 4 December 2022 official dissolution of the group was signed in Bangui.
