= Birao =

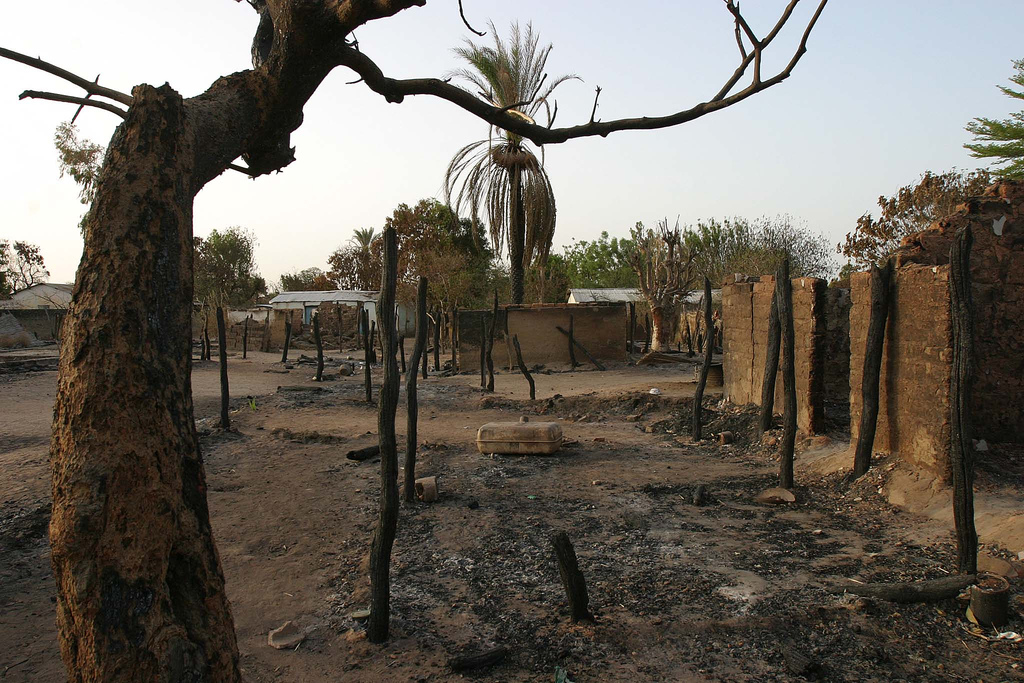
- Birao after being burnt down in 2007

- Location within Central African Republic
- Coordinates: 10.294°N 22.782°E
- Country: Central African Republic
- Prefecture: Vakaga

Government
  - Sub-Prefect: Babakri Djabaldine Nzangue
  - Mayor: Sultan Hamat Moustapha Angabo
- Elevation: 468 m (1,535 ft)

Population (2012)
  - Total: 10,178

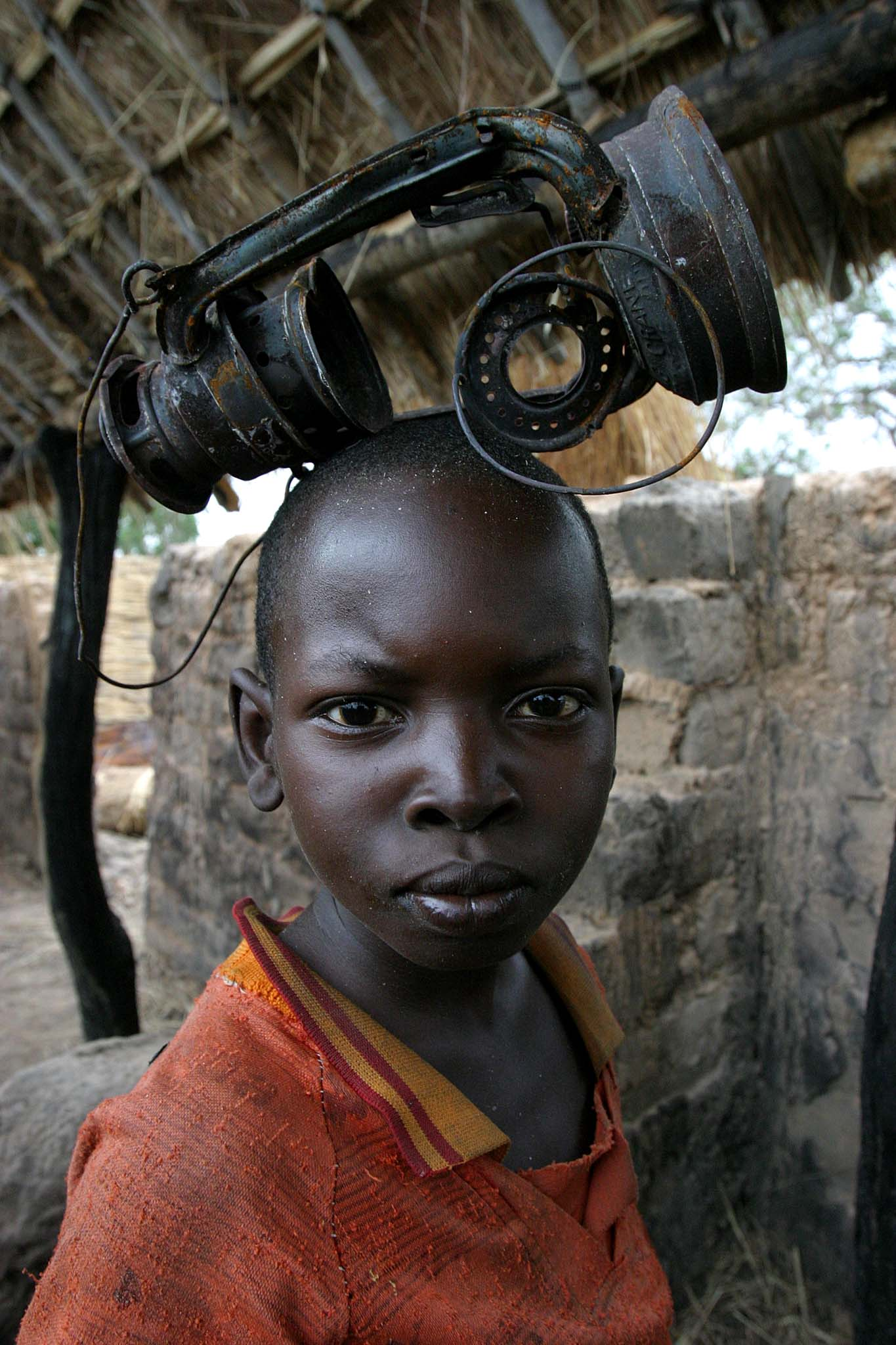
Boy playing with a burnt lamp in Birao. The town was almost completely burnt down in March 2007 during fighting between rebels and government troops.

Birao is the capital of Vakaga, one of the 14 prefectures of the Central African Republic and was an administrative post in the colony of Ubangui-Shari. In March 2007, the town was almost completely burnt down in the fighting between rebels and government troops in the area.

== History ==
=== Colonial Period ===
Birao was founded on 6 November 1918 by the French colonial government as its northernmost post in Ubangi-Shari.

=== Under Bokassa ===
Jean-Bédel Bokassa, the military ruler of the Central African Republic in the 1960s and 1970s, sent the family of Alexandre Banza to Birao after Banza attempted to overthrow him. Birao was isolated from the rest of the country and Banza's family was monitored by Bokassa. Banza's wife and nine children were kept in Birao until 1970. Beouane and Goboulo, Banza's two brothers, were also kept in Birao, but were soon imprisoned.

Birao was considered an undesirable place to be sent; the "disciplinary cells" in the Ngaragba Prison run by Bokassa were called Birao. Later, after Bokassa had fallen from power and his execution sentence had been commuted, sending Bokassa to Birao was considered a possibility because the remote location of the place would separate him from his political allies.

=== Central African Republic Bush War ===
In November 2004, at least 20 people were killed in a raid on the remote town of Birao in the north-east of the Central African Republic.

==== 2006 ====
On October 29, 2006, a force of around 150 rebels took the town of Birao, which is close to the border with Sudan and Chad. The rebels from the UFDR movement say some government troops joined them, and others were taken prisoner. The CAR government accused Sudan of being behind that attack.

On November 14, France, the traditional backer of the CAR government, offered the CAR military assistance in the form of logistics and aerial reconnaissance. France already had a regular 200-soldier contingent in the CAR supplementing the 5,000-soldier army of the CAR itself. On that day, the UFDR announced that they had suspended military activities in favour of negotiations.

On November 17, Chad's parliament approved troop deployment to the CAR. The CAR government appealed to the United Nations to send troops, and United Nations Secretary-General Kofi Annan called for the attacks in CAR's border with Darfur to end. Chad's decision to deploy troops to the CAR came as hopes for a deal with Sudan over peacekeeping forces in Darfur proved premature.

On December 14, France admitted having performed air raids against UFDR positions since the beginning of December, employing Mirage F1 fighters and helicopter gunships, and including an attack on the UFDR-controlled town of Birao. French Defence Ministry spokesman said the action was "in line with international calls to stabilise the region". UFDR reports claim that the raids had a devastating effect on the civilian population.

==== 2007 ====
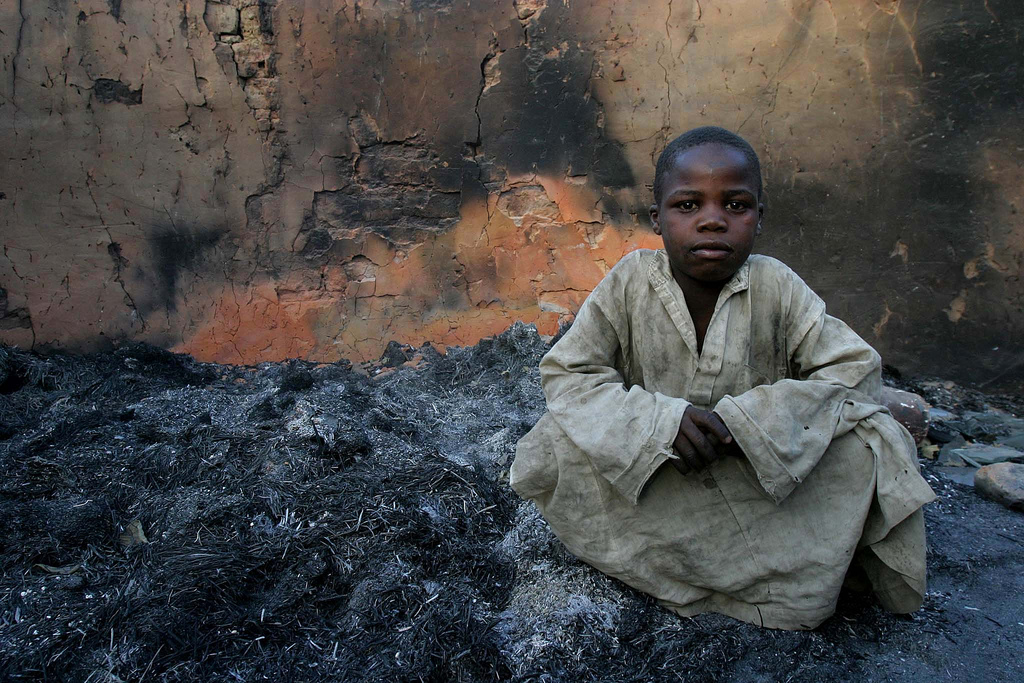
Birao in April 2006, after much of the town was burned down

On April 13, 2007, a peace agreement between the government and the UFDR was signed in Birao. The agreement provides for an amnesty for the UFDR, its recognition as a political party, and the integration of its fighters into the army.

In March 2007, the Union of Democratic Forces for Unity attacked the French army and the armed forces of the Central African Republic (FACA), which held Birao at the time. Students who used to attend the secondary school in Birao were in the UFDR forces.

=== Later fighting ===
On 10 October 2010, LRA invaded Birao. They looted the main market and kidnapped nine children. On November 15, 2010, United Nations forces returned control of Birao to the government of the Central African Republic. Later in November, a rebel group called the Convention of Patriots for Justice and Peace captured Birao. On December 1, 2010, Birao was captured by the army of Chad, on behalf of the government of the Central African Republic. In September 2011, LRA attacked Birao and abducted 12 girls and 5 boys.

On 26 June 2014 international forces left Birao following ultimatum by Popular Front for the Rebirth of Central African Republic (FPRC) armed group. On 14 July 2019 clashes erupted between Movement of Central African Liberators for Justice (MLCJ) and FPRC in Birao after two people were arrested by FPRC fighters four days before. Four FPRC militiamen were killed and the two individuals were subsequently executed. On 1 September MLCJ attacked FPRC positions in Birao leading to 23 FPRC and eight MLCJ fighters being killed. The following day the town was captured by MLCJ. On 14 September FPRC attacked Birao which was repelled. 37 FPRC and 11 MLCJ fighters were killed. On February 17, 2020, members of the Popular Front for the Rebirth of Central Africa (FPRC) attacked MINUSCA forces in Birao, leading to 12 FPRC militants being killed. On 15 March 2022 Russian mercenaries from Wagner Group temporarily entered Birao before returning to N'dele. On 7 December 2022 Russians supported by armed forces established permanent base in Birao.

== Climate ==
Birao has a hot semi-arid climate (Köppen BSh), more akin to N'Djamena or Niamey than to the rest of the Central African Republic. The city is hot to sweltering throughout the year, with every month having an average maximum over 30 °C or 86 °F, and the period before the wet season breaks in March and April sees average maxima reach a sweltering 39.7 °C or 103.5 °F. The wet season lasts from May to September, peaking in July and August, and is cooler by day than the long dry season but just as uncomfortable due to the higher humidity.

Climate data for Birao
Month	Jan	Feb	Mar	Apr	May	Jun	Jul	Aug	Sep	Oct	Nov	Dec	Year
Mean daily maximum °C (°F)	34.7 (94.5)	37.3 (99.1)	39.4 (102.9)	39.7 (103.5)	37.9 (100.2)	35 (95)	31.4 (88.5)	30.8 (87.4)	32.1 (89.8)	34.5 (94.1)	35 (95)	33.6 (92.5)	35.1 (95.2)
Daily mean °C (°F)	23.7 (74.7)	26 (79)	28.8 (83.8)	30.4 (86.7)	30.2 (86.4)	28.3 (82.9)	25.7 (78.3)	25.3 (77.5)	25.9 (78.6)	26.5 (79.7)	23.9 (75.0)	22.5 (72.5)	26.4 (79.6)
Mean daily minimum °C (°F)	12.7 (54.9)	14.8 (58.6)	18.3 (64.9)	21.1 (70.0)	22.5 (72.5)	21.6 (70.9)	20.1 (68.2)	19.8 (67.6)	19.7 (67.5)	18.6 (65.5)	12.8 (55.0)	11.4 (52.5)	17.8 (64.0)
Average rainfall mm (inches)	0 (0)	0 (0)	1 (0.0)	20 (0.8)	67 (2.6)	107 (4.2)	189 (7.4)	193 (7.6)	146 (5.7)	38 (1.5)	1 (0.0)	0 (0)	762 (29.8)
Source: Climate-Data.org

== Education ==
Birao has primary schools and high schools. Unfortunately, the town faces a scarcity of qualified teachers and an inadequate number of schools for the population.

== Security ==
FACA soldiers are present in Birao and they suffer from logistical issues. The town residents own their personal weapons due to the dire security conditions.

== Transport ==
Donkeys and horses are the main transportation modes in the town, especially on rainy sessions when many roads are inaccessible. The majority of town residents prefer donkey since it is cheap and easy to take care. Road conditions connecting to the town are terrible. Rebel presence along the road is the main factor behind the failure of road rehabilitation.

== See also ==
- Bhimrao
