= Michel Djotodia =

President of the Central African Republic from 2013 to 2014

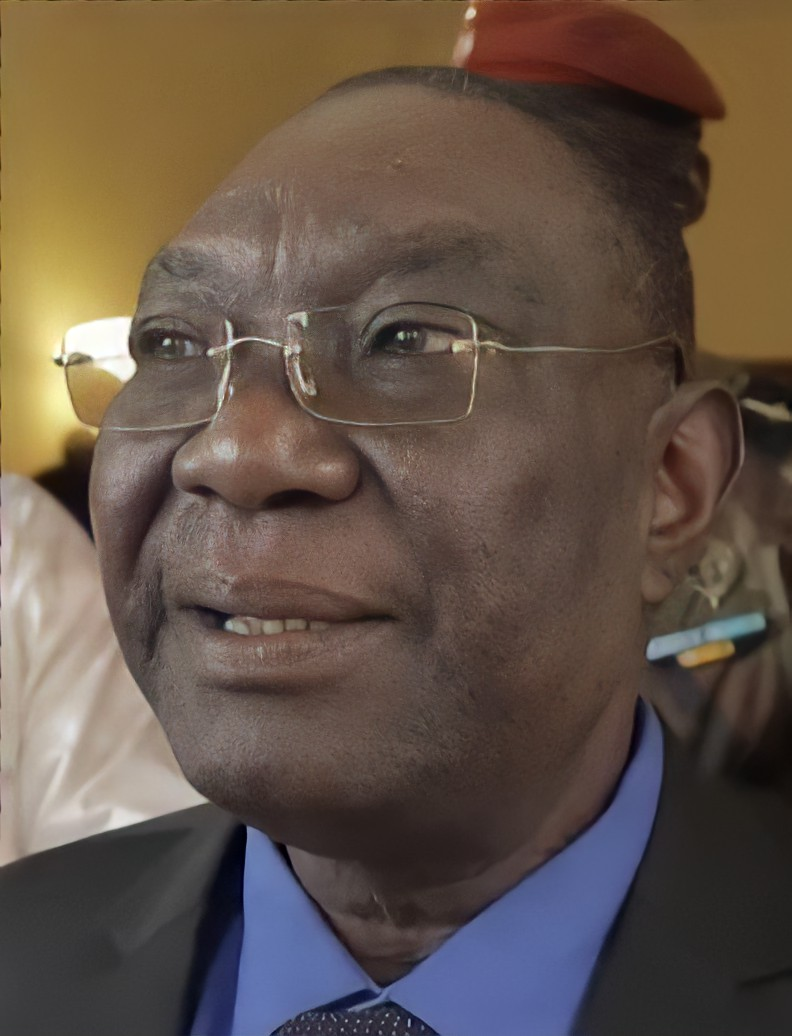
- Djotodia in 2020

7th President of the Central African Republic
- In office 24 March 2013 – 10 January 2014
- Prime Minister: Nicolas Tiangaye
- Preceded by: François Bozizé
- Succeeded by: Alexandre-Ferdinand Nguendet (acting)

Personal details
- Born: Michel Am-Nondokro Djotodia; 1949 (age 76–77) Gordil, Vakaga, French Equatorial Africa (now Central African Republic)
- Party: Union of Democratic Forces for Unity
- Other political affiliations: Séléka
- Spouse: Chantal Djotodia (m. 2012)
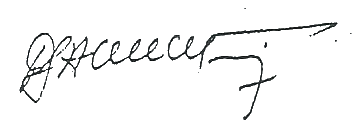
- Signature

Michel Am-Nondokro Djotodia (born 1949) is a Central African politician who was President of the Central African Republic from 2013 to 2014. He was the first Muslim to hold that office in the predominantly Christian country. (Note: Apart from President Bokassa's brief supposedly financially induced, and soon renounced, conversion to Islam in 1976.) Djotodia was a leader of the almost entirely Muslim Séléka rebel coalition in the December 2012 rebellion against President François Bozizé. Following a peace agreement, Djotodia was appointed to the government as First Deputy Prime Minister for National Defense in February 2013. When the peace agreement unravelled, Séléka captured Bangui and Djotodia took power on 24 March 2013. He promised to lead a transition to new elections in which he would not be a candidate, but his time in office was marked by escalating sectarian violence, and he was ultimately pressured into resigning by regional leaders on 10 January 2014.

== Personal life ==
Djotodia was born in Gordil, Vakaga, French Equatorial Africa (modern day Central African Republic), reportedly in 1949. He is a Muslim of the Gula people, and as one, he is part of a religious minority population in the mostly Christian Central African Republic.

He lived in the Soviet Union for about 10 years. While he was there, he furthered his tertiary studies in the Peoples' Friendship University of Russia and became fluent in Russian, got married and had children. When he returned to Vakaga he was regarded as an intellectual, well-educated man who spoke various languages in addition to French, Sango, and his ethnic language of Gula.

Although he was noted for being politically ambitious he was an obscure figure, little known outside his native region, and worked in the civil service. He was a tax official during the 1980s.

Having studied economic planning in the Soviet Union, Djotodia worked at the Central African Republic (CAR) Ministry of Planning and subsequently at the Ministry of Foreign Affairs. He served for a time as the CAR's consul in the Sudanese city of Nyala.

== Early rebellion ==
Djotodia soon became involved in a milieu of rebel activity; he was one of the founders and leading members of the Union of Democratic Forces for Unity rebel group in 2006. He lived in exile in Cotonou, Benin during the war. In November 2006 he was arrested together with his spokesman Abakar Sabon without trial by Beninese forces at the behest of the government of CAR President François Bozizé. They were released in February 2008 after agreeing to participate in peace talks with the CAR government.

== Rebellion ==
In December 2012, Djotodia was a key leader in the Séléka rebel coalition when it succeeded in rapidly taking control of a large portion of the country. At peace talks in January 2013, President Bozizé agreed to appoint a prime minister from the opposition and incorporate the rebels into the government. Following negotiations, a national unity government, headed by Prime Minister Nicolas Tiangaye, was appointed on 3 February 2013; it was composed of Bozizé supporters, the opposition, and rebels. Djotodia received the key post of First Deputy Prime Minister for National Defense.

== Presidency ==
=== Takeover ===
The peace agreement unraveled in March 2013, as Séléka resumed seizing towns, accusing Bozizé of failing to keep his promises. The rebels kept their five ministers, including Djotodia, from going to Bangui. Djotodia said that rebel soldiers made the decision, not himself. There was speculation that, while Djotodia may have been content with his prominent new government post, others in Séléka wanted to take power outright. After days of fighting, the rebels captured Bangui on 24 March 2013, forcing Bozizé to flee the country, and Djotodia declared himself President. Djotodia said that there would be a three-year transitional period and that Tiangaye would continue to serve as Prime Minister.

=== Djotodia Administration (2013–2014) ===
Djotodia promptly suspended the constitution and dissolved the government, as well as the National Assembly. He then reappointed Tiangaye as Prime Minister on 27 March 2013. Top military and police officers met with Djotodia and recognized him as President on 28 March 2013. A new government headed by Tiangaye was appointed on 31 March 2013; Djotodia retained the defense portfolio.

On 3 April 2013, African leaders meeting in Chad declared that they did not recognize Djotodia as President; instead, they proposed the formation of an inclusive transitional council and the holding of new elections in 18 months, rather than three years as envisioned by Djotodia. Speaking on 4 April, Information Minister Christophe Gazam Betty said that Djotodia had accepted the proposals of the African leaders; however, he suggested that Djotodia could remain in office if he were elected to head the transitional council. Djotodia accordingly signed a decree on 6 April for the formation of a transitional council that would act as a transitional parliament. The council was tasked with electing an interim president to serve during an 18-month transitional period leading to new elections.

The transitional council, composed of 105 members, met for the first time on 13 April 2013 and immediately elected Djotodia as interim President; there were no other candidates. A few days later, regional leaders publicly accepted Djotodia's transitional leadership, but, in a symbolic show of disapproval, stated that he would "not be called President of the Republic, but Head of State of the Transition". According to the plans for the transition, Djotodia would not stand as a candidate for President in the election that would conclude the transition.

In the months that followed Séléka's takeover, the group was criticized for continuing to perpetrate violence against civilians. Djotodia was formally sworn in as President on 18 August 2013. On that occasion he said that he hoped to be "the last of my countrymen to have to take up arms in order to come to power". He also vowed that he would not stand as a presidential candidate.

==== Economic exploits ====
Djotodia's government came under scrutiny from NGOs including Global Witness due to the lucrative deals it struck with logging companies involved in the timber industry. The French Industrie forestière de Batalimo (IFB), Lebanese Société d’exploitation forestière centrafricaine (SEFCA) and Chinese Vicwood Group reportedly made illegal tax payments totalling €3,7 million to the Ministry of Finance, as well as monthly payments to Séléka fighters to safeguard their installations. SEFCA also paid an additional "advance" of €380,876 directly to Djotodia's government. According to a report from the UN Security Council, "illegal artisanal exploitation surged in non-attributed forest areas" under the Djotodia government, while logging trucks were "systematically subjected to illegal tax levying".

Aside from timber, the Central African economy is highly dependent on diamond and gold from its mining exploits. The sale of rough diamonds was temporarily suspended by the KPCS over fears of illicit trade by Séléka, Anti-balaka and other rebel groups. However, illegal trafficking of both diamond and gold (mainly to Cameroon, Chad and Sudan) continued, in which Séléka members were actively involved. Séléka further engaged in elephant poaching, organising illegal sales of ivory on international markets. According to the above-cited UN report, poaching and wildlife trafficking (also including antelope species) could be seen as "central elements of the Séléka rebellion".

==== Resignation ====
Sectarian violence between Muslims and non-Muslims continued to escalate, and Djotodia faced pressure from regional leaders and the international community due to his apparent inability to control the situation. Djotodia resigned as President at a summit held in N'Djamena on 10 January 2014. He then went into exile in Benin on 11 January. He was welcomed at Cotonou Airport by Benin's Foreign Minister Nassirou Bako Arifari, who said that Benin received Djotodia "at the request of member states of the Economic Community of Central African States" as a "contribution to the search for peace in central Africa."

Séléka announced in July 2014 that Djotodia had been restored as leader of the group.

== Notes ==
Political offices
| Preceded by François Bozizé | President then Transitional Head of State of the Central African Republic; 2013–2014 | Succeeded by Alexandre-Ferdinand Nguendet; Acting |
