= Union of Democratic Forces for Unity =

Central African rebel group

- Union des forces démocratiques pour le rassemblement
- Leaders: Abakar Sabone; Michel Djotodia; Justin Hassane
- Spokesperson: Hamad Hamadine
- Founded: 14 September 2006
- Dissolved: 2012
- Merged into: Seleka
- Groups: MLCJ; GAPLC; FDC
- Headquarters: Vakaga
- Active regions: North-eastern Central African Republic

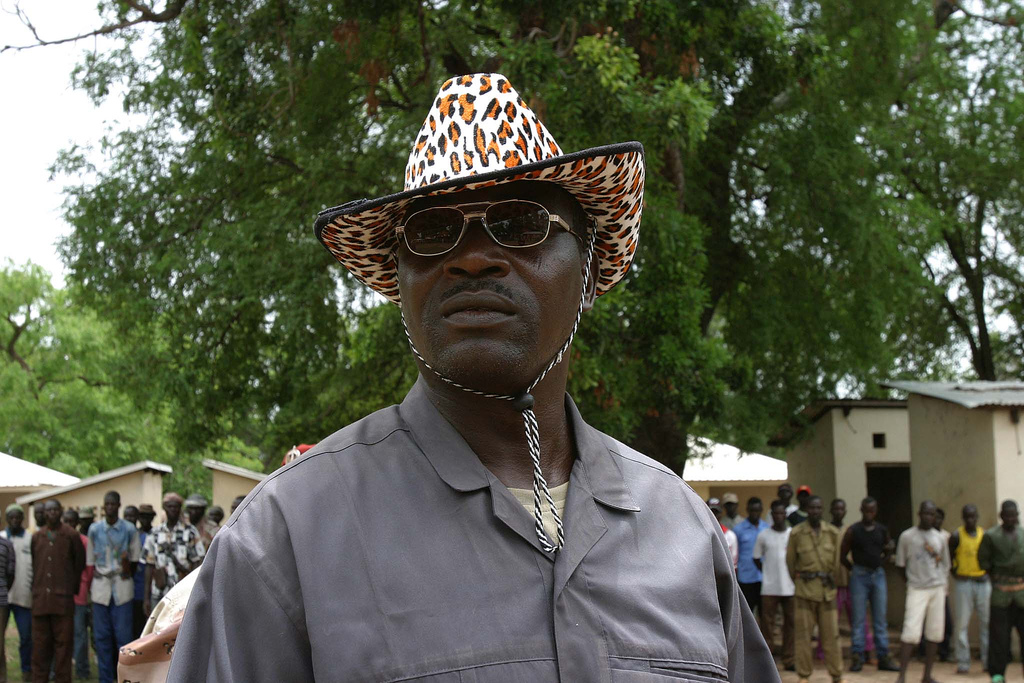
General Damane Zakaria, the head of the UFDR

Union of Democratic Forces for Unity (French: Union des Forces Démocratiques pour le Rassemblement, UFDR) was a rebel group which fought against the government in the 2004–2007 civil war in that country, known as the Central African Republic Bush War. The Central African Republic has accused the government of Sudan of backing the UFDR.

On April 13, 2007, a peace agreement between the government and the UFDR was signed in Birao. The agreement provides for an amnesty for the UFDR, its recognition as a political party, and the eventual integration of its fighters into the army.
