= Vakaga =

Prefecture of the Central African Republic

Coordinates: 10°20′N 22°45′E

- Prefecture
- Vakaga in the Central African Republic

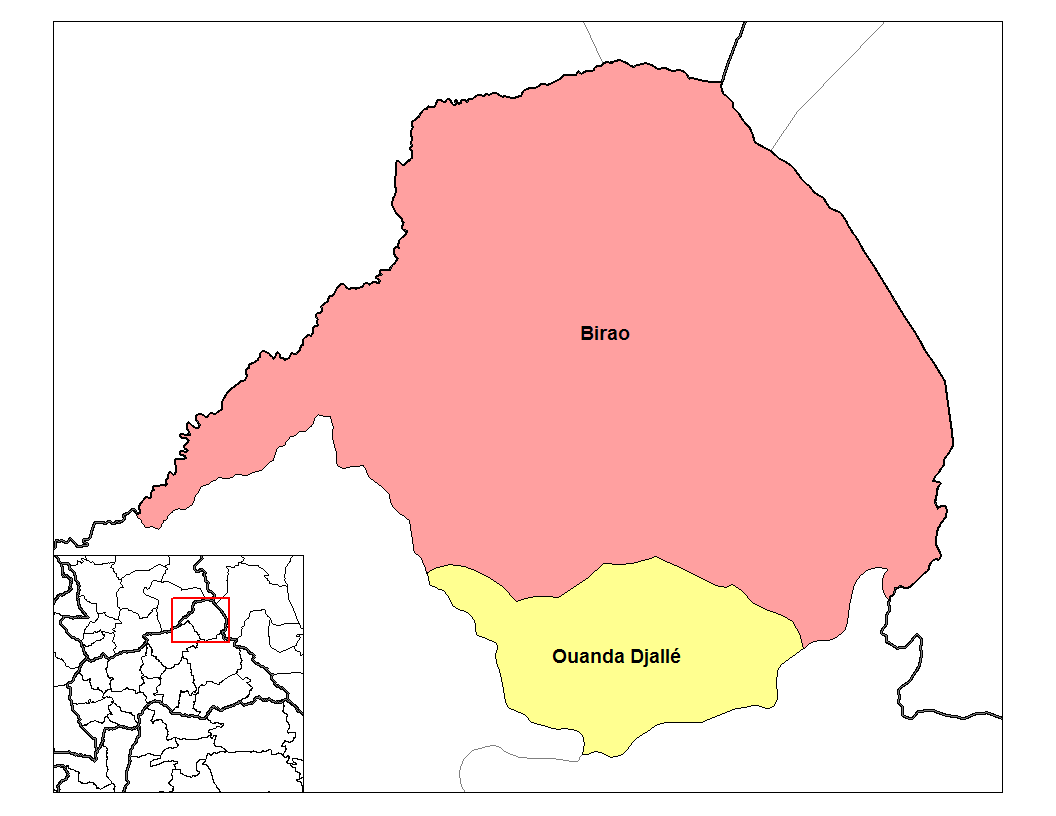
- Sub-prefectures of Vakaga
- Country: Central African Republic
- Capital: Birao

Government
  - Prefect: Judes Ngayakon

Area
  - Total: 46,500 km^{2} (18,000 sq mi)

Population (2003 census)
  - Total: 52,255
  - Estimate (2024 estimation): 89,189

Vakaga is one of the 20 prefectures of the Central African Republic. Its capital is Birao. It covers an area of 46,500 km^{2} and has a population of 52,255 (2003 census). In 2024, official estimates suggest the population reached 89,189 inhabitants.

The extremely low population density, 1.1 people/km^{2}, is a result of the capture of the majority of the region's inhabitants by slave-traders from the Sudan in the second half of the nineteenth century. Vakaga is known for its oil reserves.

== Sub-prefectures ==
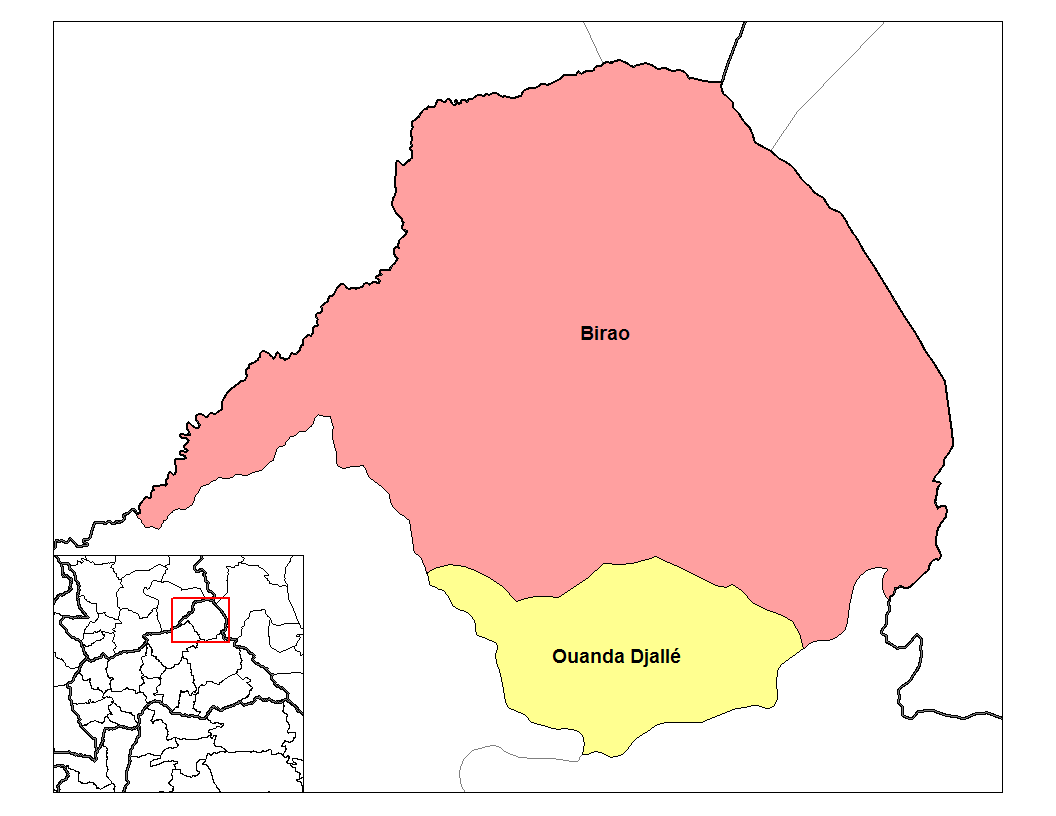
Sub-prefectures of Vakaga

- Birao
- Ouanda Djallé

== Notable people ==
- Michel Djotodia, 5th President of the Central African Republic
