= Wagner Group activities in the Central African Republic =

Russian paramilitary group operations

The Wagner Group, also known as PMC Wagner, a Russian paramilitary organization also described as a private military company (PMC), a network of mercenaries, and a de facto unit of the Russian Ministry of Defence (MoD) or Russia's military intelligence agency, the GRU, has conducted operations in the Central African Republic since late 2018.

There have been an estimated 1,000 Wagner mercenaries stationed in the CAR since 2018, protecting the government of Faustin-Archange Touadéra against rebels amid the Central African Republic Civil War, and seeking to control and extract valuable natural resources. Precious metal extraction could aid the Russian government to weather the international sanctions imposed for its invasion of Ukraine. Wagner forces have been accused of perpetrating human rights abuses in CAR, including the torture and killing of civilians. By 2026 remaining Wagner Group has reorganised in CAR under Pavel Prigozhin and has established a tremadol smuggling network.

== Military and militia activities ==
In mid-January 2018, it was reported that Wagner may deploy a contingent of its PMCs to the Central African Republic (CAR), as Russia successfully lobbied the UN Security Council to allow it to ship weapons and ammunition to the country, despite an active arms embargo in place since 2013 under Security Council Resolution 2127. Reuters reported that France had offered to transport arms seized in Somalia to the former French colony, but was muscled out of the country by Russia.

In late March 2018, Russia's Ministry of Foreign Affairs stated five Russian soldiers and 170 "civilian instructors" had been sent to the CAR to train its servicemen. According to CAR's president, Faustin-Archange Touadéra, the training provided would strengthen the effectiveness of the CAR's armed forces in combating "plunderers". Later, the instructors were confirmed to be Wagner PMCs who were sent to the CAR to protect lucrative mines, to support the CAR government and provide close protection for Touadéra.

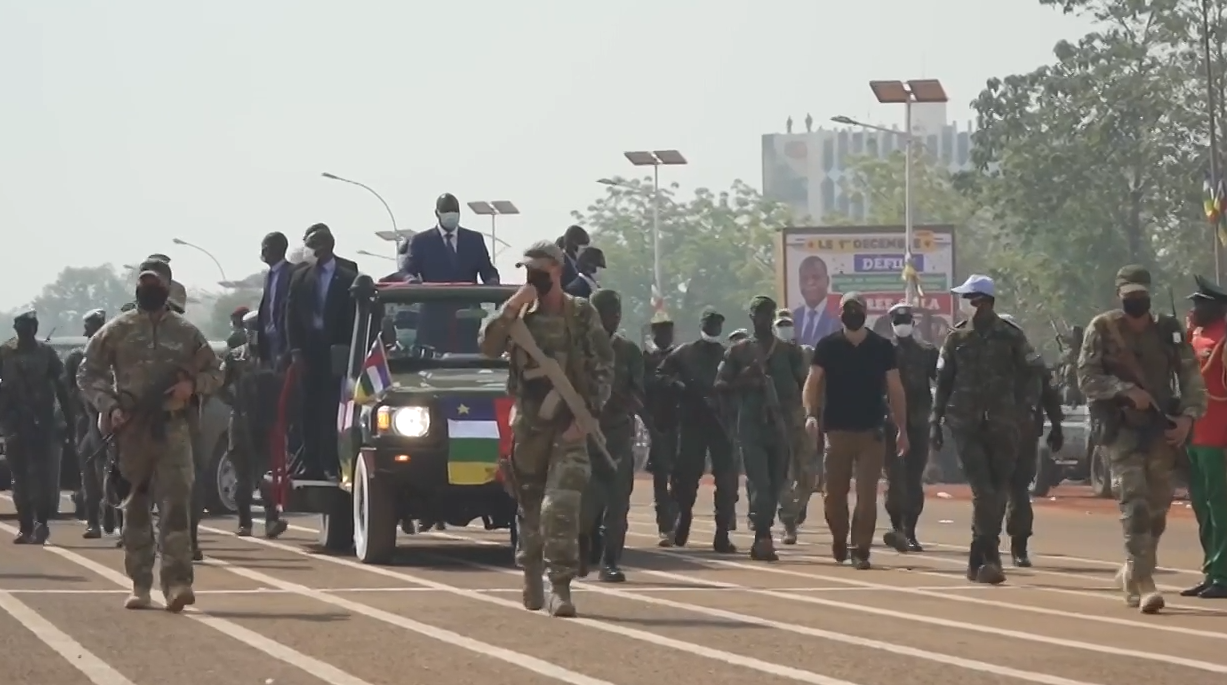
Russian mercenaries providing security for the President of the Central African Republic, 2022

The role of the PMCs was also to fill a security vacuum left by France after it withdrew its military forces from the country in October 2016. The country had been in the midst of a civil war since 2012, which left three-quarters of it under rebel control. The PMCs' camp was set up on 24 March 2018, about 60 kilometers from the capital Bangui at the Berengo estate that was used by CAR's former ruler Jean-Bédel Bokassa. This deployment brought the number of PMCs in Sudan and the CAR to about 370.

In April, locals blocked a Russian-registered Cessna from taking off in rebel-held Kaga-Bandoro, which is located near diamond deposits. According to the CAR government, the plane was carrying Russian military advisers who had been there for peace negotiations with the rebels and witnesses stated three or four Russian soldiers from the aircraft visited the compounds of Muslim rebel leaders. This raised suspicions by CIT and the Transparency International INGO that Wagner PMCs were also guarding diamond mines in rebel territory. In 2021, a report to the UN Security Council regarding human rights violations in the CAR noted that the Russian PMCs established themselves in the country's major mining centers.

In late May 2018, the Neue Zürcher Zeitung newspaper reported the number of Russian PMCs in the CAR was 1,400. Jamestown Foundation fellow Sukhankin told Polygraph.info that the Wagner Group was in charge of military operations in the country, while another Russian private military company called Patriot was in charge of protecting VIPs. 10 Russian military instructors were stationed in the lawless town of Bangassou, on the border with the Democratic Republic of the Congo, while another unit was in the key town of Sibut, near the rebel-held territory.

In early July 2018, the Wagner Group's Col. Konstantin Pikalov arrived in the CAR and was stationed there during that summer. He returned to the CAR following the elections in Madagascar later that year, where he took part as a security consultant for different candidates. According to Bellingcat's Christo Grozev, during his time in the CAR, Pikalov was "a kind of intermediary" between Yevgeny Prigozhin's private companies, the Russian Ministry of Defense and the Kremlin.

In August 2018, Russia signed a military cooperation agreement with the CAR, while it also helped broker, along with Sudan, a tentative agreement among armed groups in the country. Three months later, Al Jazeera was given unprecedented access to Russian military instructors in the CAR. While the Al Jazeera crew was filming the Russian-facilitated training for CAR troops, Valery Zakharov, the Russian special advisor to the President of the CAR, stated that the Wagner Group amounts to no more than an "urban legend" and that training in the country was being done by Russian reservists.

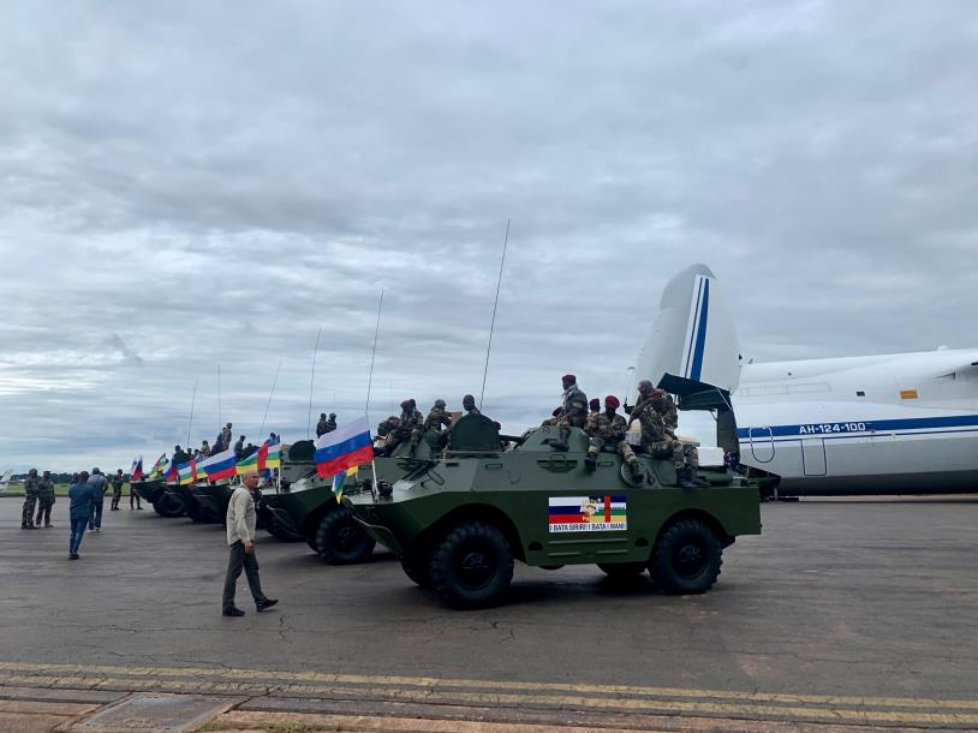
Delivery of Russian BRDM-2 armored vehicles to the Central African Republic, October 2020

In December 2018, the Ukrainian SBU reported that the umbrella structure of Wagner in the CAR is a commercial firm affiliated with Yevgeny Prigozhin – M-Finance LLC Security Service from St. Petersburg, whose main areas of activity are mining of precious stones and private security services. According to the SBU, some of the PMCs were transported to Africa directly on Prigozhin's private aircraft. The SBU reported that they identified 37 Russian citizens who were engaged in the CAR by Russian military intelligence on a rotational basis as members of M-Finance LLC Security Service, whose head was reported to be Valery Zakharov from St. Petersburg. Zakharov was said to be a Wagner PMC himself, whose personal Wagner number was M-5658. Zakharov also acted as a Russian diplomat and security advisor to the CAR's president. According to Bellingcat's Grozev, Konstantin Pikalov was the one who was ultimately giving instructions to Zakharov.

According to information obtained by the Ukrainian SBU, 1,012 Wagner PMCs were airlifted on two Tupolev Tu-154 airliners between August and December 2018, to Sudan, the CAR and other African countries.

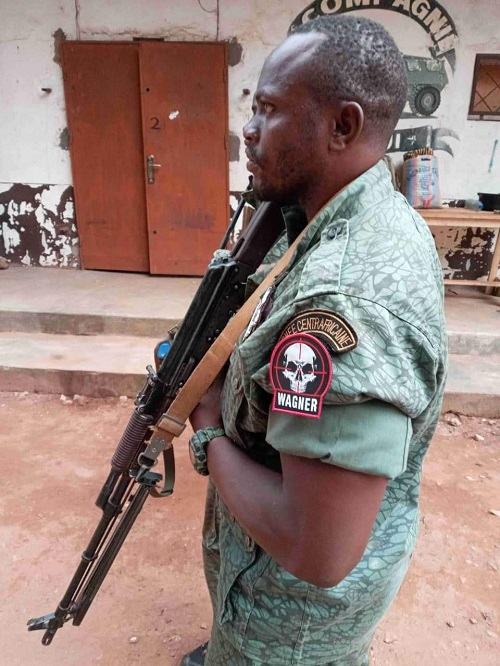
A Central African soldier wearing a Wagner Group patch

Five days before the 2020–21 Central African general election, rebels attacked and captured the CAR's fourth-largest city, Bambari. In response, the government requested assistance from Rwanda and Russia as per bilateral agreements. Rwanda bolstered its troops serving in the UN peacekeeping mission in the CAR, while Russia sent an additional 300 military instructors to the country. Concurrently, Russian and Rwandan "mercenaries" were reportedly deployed along with government troops at the village of Boyali, 130 kilometers northwest of the capital Bangui. The following day, UN and government forces recaptured Bambari.

On 25 January 2021, CAR forces, backed by Russian PMCs and Rwandan troops, attacked Boyali, killing 44 rebels who were plotting an assault on the capital. Subsequently, CAR forces, supported by the Russian contractors and Rwandan troops, captured a number of strategic towns throughout February 2021, including Bossembele, Bouar, Béloko and Bossangoa. As the rebels were being pushed back, Valery Zakharov urged them to hand over their leaders to the CAR's security forces.

During the fighting, the rebel Coalition of Patriots for Change (CPC) claimed its fighters killed several Wagner PMCs and captured one when they destroyed their truck near Bambari on 10 February. At the end of February, a Gazelle helicopter, reportedly belonging to the Wagner Group, crashed due to technical problems while on a mission to retrieve PMCs who were wounded while engaging rebels that ambushed a CAR military convoy. The helicopter crew survived the crash.

Government advances, with the support of Russian and Rwandan forces, continued during March, April and May 2021. This included the capture of the strategic towns of Bria and Kaga-Bandoro and the Bakouma sub-prefecture. Some towns were seized solely by the Russian PMCs, including Nzacko. In at least one instance, the contractors reportedly included Syrians.

In mid-May, the Russians captured a village about 40 kilometers from Bambari during fighting that left 20 people dead. At the end of the month, Russian and Syrian PMCs of the Wagner Group attacked a rebel checkpoint at the entrance of a village 28 kilometers from Bria, killing three CPC fighters. Towards the end of July, the CAR military was leaving the frontline against the CPC to the PMCs. The plan was for government troops to occupy the captured positions after they had been secured by the contractors.

At the end of March 2021, the Office of the United Nations High Commissioner for Human Rights (OHCHR) stated it received reports of mass executions, arbitrary detentions, torture, forced displacement of civilians, and attacks on humanitarian workers attributable to private military forces allied with the CAR military, including the Wagner Group, as well as to UN peacekeepers in some instances. In one incident, it was reported that a civilian vehicle was fired upon from a checkpoint outside Grimari, reportedly controlled by the Russian PMCs and CAR soldiers, killing four people, including an aid worker. The civilians were fleeing Bambari. Local residents and rights groups also stated that in Boda, west of Bangui, the PMCs occupied two schools since February, blocking around 2,000 children from attending class. Still, overall, more than 85 percent of the nearly 200 rights violations documented that took place between October and December 2020, were attributed to rebel groups, including the CPC.

At the end of April 2021, the CAR government received a report by the United Nations, detailing abuses committed by CAR and allied Russian forces between December 2020 and April 2021. The government described the information as "denunciations", but promised to investigate them. The CAR Ministry of Justice issued instructions to set up a "special commission of inquiry" which would bring in the country's three prosecutorial services.

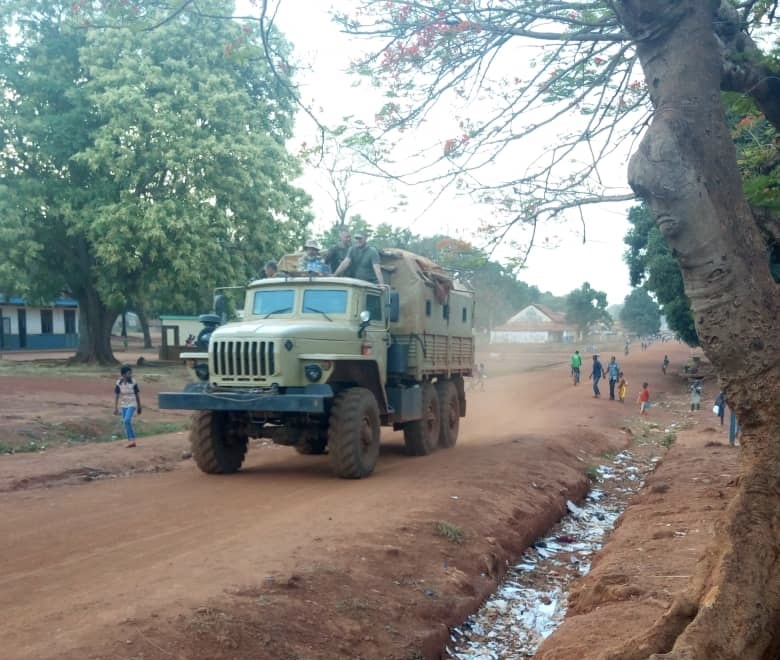
A vehicle with Russian and Syrian mercenaries from the Wagner Group passing through the town of Bria, April 2021

In early May 2021, the CAR government notified the UN Security Council it was requesting 600 new Russian military instructors. According to Russia, the instructors would be unarmed.

At the end of May 2021, Central African Republic government and Russian paramilitary forces, pursued CAR rebels across the border with Chad. The incident left six Chadian soldiers dead. According to the Chadian government, the CAR military pursued rebels over the border into Chad and attacked a Chadian military border post, killing the soldiers. According to Chad, five of the soldiers were killed after being abducted and taken over the border into the CAR. The CAR government denied this and stated the rebels who they were pursuing were responsible. Some Chadian army sources named the Wagner Group as the Russian paramilitary force fighting alongside CAR forces. According to The New York Times, in the CAR the word "Wagner" is colloquially used to refer to Russian involvement in the country.

At the end of June 2021, The New York Times obtained a report given to the UN Security Council which detailed that the Russian PMCs, under the guise of unarmed military advisers, led government forces during the January–February counter-offensive. According to the report, the PMCs, along with their allied forces, committed violations that "included cases of excessive force, indiscriminate killings, occupation of schools and looting on a large scale, including of humanitarian organizations". The report was said to be based on photographic evidence and confidential testimonies by witnesses and local officials. The report also found that the rebels conducted forcible recruitment of child soldiers, attacks against peacekeepers, looting of aid groups and sexual assaults on women. At the end of October, United Nations experts urged the CAR government to cut ties with private military and security personnel, including the Wagner Group, accusing them of committing human rights abuses.

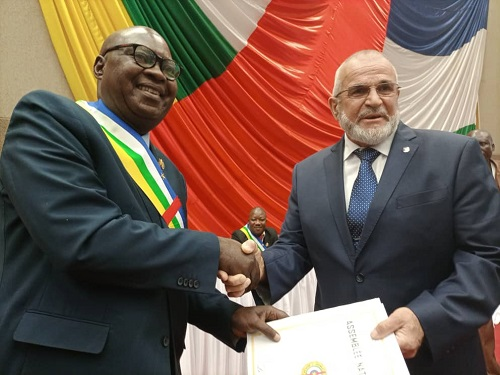
President of the National Assembly of the Central African Republic Simplice Sarandji with Wagner Group representative, Alexander Ivanov, October 2021

By mid-November 2021, according to a report by the European External Action Service, most of the Central African Armed Forces deployed units were operating under direct command or supervision by Wagner Group PMCs, who took command of at least one EU-trained battalion (Bataillon d'Infanterie Territoriale 7), and the Wagner Group has established "a solid influence" on the CAR military's general staff and other government institutions. As of late December, the rebels switched from frontline fighting to "guerrilla" warfare, reportedly causing "a large number of wounded" among the Russian PMCs, according to an expert at France's Center for International Studies.

In December 2021, the Wagner Group was reported to be arresting civilians in Bria, and forcing them to do work for the contractors. On 4 January 2022, Wagner Group members reportedly killed four civilians in the town. As they left, they took the bodies with them. The following day, the contractors were also accused of killing 17 people in a village near the Cameroon border. Mid-January, between 30 and 70 civilians were reportedly killed, some by stray fire, during an operation by the CAR military and the Wagner Group near Bria against the UPC rebels. Subsequently, the UN launched an investigation into the killings.

In mid-February 2022, a Wagner-led government offensive was launched in the northeast of the country, that involved 400 Wagner contractors and 200 former rebels. On 12 February, Wagner PMCs and government troops advanced into Ouadda, killing Damane Zakaria, leader of the Patriotic Rally for the Renewal of the Central African Republic (RPRC) armed group, and 20 of his men. Five days later, at least 100 Wagner fighters also arrived in Sam Ouandja.

In early March, the Wagner Group recaptured the town of Nzacko, during fighting that left five rebels and two PMCs dead. Several days later, Wagner members clashed with rebels in a village near Ndélé, pushing the rebels out. Mid-March, fighting between Wagner and the rebels in a town northwest of Tiringoulou left around 20 people dead.

Mid-April 2022, Wagner Group PMCs were accused of killing 20 civilians in two towns between Ndélé and Tiringoulou. In late May, Wagner forces established their presence in a number of towns in Vakaga province, including Tiringoulou.

On 3 May 2022, the Human Rights Watch (HRW) group called upon the Special Criminal Court (SCC) and International Criminal Court (ICC) for the prosecution of the Wagner Group. The HRW investigation, which included interviewing 40 people, including 10 victims and 15 witnesses, between 2019 and 2021, blamed Wagner contractors for the killing of 13 civilians near Bossangoa in 2021. Four days later, The Daily Beast cited CAR officials who alleged attacks and rapes by Wagner contractors at a Henri Izamo military camp hospital in Bangui on 10 April 2022.

In late June, it was reported that since the start of the year Wagner PMCs conducted nine raids, including helicopter assaults, on mines in the lawless border areas between the CAR and Sudan, with three major attacks taking place on 13 March, 15 April and 24 May. During the assaults, the PMCs reportedly took everything they could before leaving. The attacks left dozens of miners and a number of rebels dead. In September 2022, The Daily Beast interviewed survivors and witnesses of yet another massacre committed by the Wagner Group in Bèzèrè village in December 2021, which involved torture, killing and disembowelment of a number of women, including pregnant ones.

In mid-January 2023, the Wagner Group sustained relatively heavy casualties as a new government military offensive was launched near the CAR border with Cameroon and Chad. Fighting also erupted near the border with Sudan. The rebels claimed between seven and 17 Wagner PMCs were among the dozens of casualties. A CAR military source also confirmed seven Wagner contractors were killed in one ambush.

In February 2023, The Guardian reported that Wagner mercenaries sustained heavy casualties in clashes with rebels amid a push to take control of lucrative gold mines.

From March to May 2024, Wagner trained Azande Ani Kpi Gbe (AAKG) militia in Obo. After receiving training, around 30 AAKG members were deployed to Ouham.

On 11 July 2026, The Wall Street Journal reported that there remains up to 500 members of the Wagner Group acting independent of the Russian government. This remnant group is reportedly located along the upper reaches of the Ubangi river and is now led by Pavel Prigozhin, son of the late founder of the Wagner Group. After Prigozhin's death, the group managed to preserve the connections with the Central African government, and is now partially maintaining its income by controlling the smuggling of Tramadol across the country.

== Corporate activities ==
Wagner has participated in mining and logging operations, providing security for convoys, providing customs services, and even producing local vodka and beer.

According to a 2022 joint investigation and report from European Investigative Collaborations (EIC), the French organization All Eyes on Wagner, and the UK-based Dossier Center, Wagner Group has been controlling the Diamville diamond trading company in Central African Republic since 2019. Wagner also controls the company Midas Ressources which extracts gold from the Ndassima mine.

The illegal timber trade, already a large-scale problem in the Central African Republic well before Wagner's arrival, has been linked since 2021 to a "tripartite agreement" between government officials, Wagner mercenaries, and a Russian company from Saint Petersburg named Bois Rouge. Wagner has reportedly branched out into the timber industry and started logging a forest in Lobaye. In the process, Wagner fighters invaded and "emptied" entire villages to carry out their logging activities at virtually no cost, creating a potential revenue of up to $890 million on international markets.

In 2026 Wall Street Journal reported that Wagner in CAR has remained independent and has established a drug trafficking hub, selling large amounts of tramadol to finance its activities.

== Responses ==
France terminated its military and humanitarian aid to CAR in response to CAR's government's collaboration with Wagner.

The United States government, seeking to counter Wagner's influence, has extended an offer to President Touadéra in mid-December 2022 to expel Wagner from the country in exchange for providing military training to CAR armed forces, humanitarian aid, increased support for the CAR UN Mission, as well as help in removing former CAR president François Bozizé from Chad (whom Touadéra suspects of being behind incursions into CAR territory).

== Deaths of journalists ==
On 30 July 2018, three Russian journalists (Kirill Radchenko, Alexander Rastorguyev and Orkhan Dzhemal) belonging to the Russian online news organisation Investigation Control Centre (TsUR), which is linked to Mikhail Khodorkovsky, were ambushed and killed by unknown assailants in the Central African Republic, three days after they had arrived in the country to investigate local Wagner activities. The ambush took place 23 kilometers from Sibut when armed men emerged from the bush and opened fire on their vehicle. The journalists' driver survived the attack, but was afterward kept incommunicado by the authorities. In its response to the killings, Russia's foreign ministry noted that the dead journalists had been traveling without official accreditation.

BBC News and AFP said the circumstances of their deaths were unclear. According to the Interfax news agency, robbery could have been a motive. An expensive camera kit and more than 8,000 dollars disappeared from the scene, although three canisters of gasoline, which is considered a valuable commodity in the CAR, were left in the vehicle. A local official and their driver stated that the attackers were wearing turbans and speaking Arabic. Russian and CAR state media initially reported that the authorities suspected Seleka rebels to be behind the killings. According to local residents, interviewed by Khodorkovsky's investigators, around 10 people had camped out nearby before the ambush, waiting there for several hours. Shortly before the attack, they saw another car with "three armed white men ... and two Central Africans" pass by.

Per an initial report in The New York Times, there was no indication that the killings were connected with the journalists' investigation of the Wagner Group's activities in the Central African Republic, but a follow-up article cited a Human Rights Watch researcher who commented that "Many things don't add up" in regards to the mysterious killings. It reaffirmed there was nothing to contradict the official version that the killings were a random act by thieves, but noted speculation within Russia that blamed the Wagner Group, while also adding a theory by a little known African news media outlet that France, which previously ruled the CAR when it was a colony, was behind the killings as a warning to Moscow to stay clear of its area of influence. Moscow-based defence analyst Pavel Felgenhauer thought it was unlikely they were killed by Wagner's PMCs, while the Security Service of Ukraine claimed that it had evidence about the PMCs involvement.

During their investigation, the journalists tried to enter the PMCs' camp, but they were told that they needed accreditation from the country's Defense Ministry. The accreditation was previously only given to an AFP journalist who was still not allowed to take any photographs or interview anyone. The killings took place one day after the journalists visited the Wagner Group encampment at Berengo. According to Bellingcat's Christo Grozev, after the journalists arrived in the CAR, the Wagner Group's Col. Konstantin Pikalov issued a letter describing how they should be followed and spied on.

According to the Dozhd television station, the Russian private military company Patriot was involved in the killings.

In January 2019, it was revealed that, according to evidence gathered by Khodorkovsky's Dossier Center (Russian: Центра «Досье»), a major in the Central African Gendarmerie was involved in the ambush. The major was in regular communication with the journalists' driver on the day of their murders and he had frequent communications with a Wagner PMC who was a specialist trainer in counter-surveillance and recruitment in Central Africa. The police officer was also said to have attended a camp run by Russian military trainers on the border with Sudan, and maintained regular contact with Russian PMCs after his training. The investigation into the murders by the Dossier Center was suspended two months later due to lack of participation by government agencies and organizations. As of 2023, the murders remain unsolved.

== See also ==
- Black Russians, pro–government militias in the Central African Republic

Regional:

- Wagner Group activities in Africa
- Africa Corps (Russia)

== Sources ==
- Parker, John W. (2017). Putin's Syrian Gambit: Sharper Elbows, Bigger Footprint, Stickier Wicket. Institute for National Strategic Studies Strategic Perspectives, No. 25. Washington, D.C.: National Defense University Press. ISBN 9780160939983.
- Wagner seeks to regain control in south-east, Africa Intelligence, 28 March 2025 (requires free registration)
