= Dmitri Sytyi =

Russian businessman

- Дмитрий Сергеевич Сытый
- Born: 23 March 1989 (age 37); Minsk, Byelorussian SSR, Soviet Union
- Education: St. Petersburg State University of Economics and Finance (2006-2011); International University of Catalonia (2011-2012); Skema Business School (2014-15)
- Occupations: Specialist in translation marketing at Internet Research Agency; Founder of Lobaye Invest SARL; Director of Maison Russe; Founder of First Industrial Co.
- Years active: mid-2010s 2018 - present June 3, 2021 - present 2023 - present
- Agent(s): Wagner Group, Russia, Central African Republic
- Known for: Wagner Group's head of communications in the Central African Republic from 2017 to 2023, head of the Wagner Group in the Central African Republic since 2023 (alongside Vitaly Perfilev)

Dmitri Sergeyevich Sytyi (Russian: Дмитрий Сергеевич Сытый) is a Russian financier and businessman who manages media and communications of the Wagner Group in the Central African Republic. He is considered a close ally to Russian president Vladimir Putin and the right-hand man of Yevgeny Prigozhin before the latter's death. Following Prigozhin's death, Sytyi has been described as the man running the Wagner Group and Russian operations in the Central African Republic alongside Vitaly Perfilev.

== Biography ==
=== Early life and education ===
Sytyi was born on March 23, 1989, in Minsk (in Belarus, then a republic of the Soviet Union). He studied international business at the Saint Petersburg State University of Economics and Finance between 2006 and 2011 and then completed a master's degree at the International University of Catalonia between 2011 and 2012. Sytyi then attended the Skema Business School beginning in September 2014 to pursue his master's in international marketing and business development, but the school declared him a dropout in December 2016. Sytyi speaks English, French, Spanish, and Russian.

=== Central African Republic and Prigozhin-linked networks ===
One of Sytyi's first jobs in the mid-2010s was as a specialist in marketing in the translation department of the Internet Research Agency, a Russian propaganda and influence operations company. Sytyi first arrived in the Central African Republic in September 2017 with Nikolai Dobronravin to conduct a study for the company M-Invest owned by Yevgeny Prigozhin, a Russian oligarch who also owned the Internet Research Agency. Sytyi attended meetings with Valery Zakharov, President Touadera's advisor of internal security and Yevgeny Kopot, a translator and communications advisor between Russia and the CAR, allowing him to sit in on discussions between Prigozhin's Wagner Group and the Central African government.

Sytyi accompanied Touadera to various events regarding Russia-Africa relations in Russia between 2018 and 2019, including the St. Petersburg International Economic Forum in 2018 and the 2019 Russia-Africa Summit. He founded the Lobaye Invest SARL mining company in 2018. (Note: American and EU authorities attribute Sytyi as founding Lobaye, although a 2022 All Eyes on Wagner investigation states that Sytyi was appointed a shareholder of the company which is a subsidiary of Prigozhin's M-Invest.) While Lobaye is predominantly a mining company, it also owns media outlets and NGOs including Radio Lengo Songo, Aimons Notre Afrique, and Le Monde en Vrai. Sytyi has also been accused of working for the Information and Communication Bureau, a Central African and Russian pro-government outlet that pays journalists to write articles critical of France, anti-Russian and anti-Touadera figures. He also participated in discussions to end the Central African Republic Civil War, culminating in a peace agreement in Khartoum in 2019. Sytyi was sanctioned by the United States for his work with the Wagner Group and affiliated companies in 2020. He is considered to be heavily connected with rebel groups along the Sudanese-Central African border, and is knowledgeable of Sudanese state secrets. Sytyi also began funding and working with the Rapid Support Forces, run by Hemedti.

=== Maison Russe and assassination attempt ===
On June 3, 2021, Sytyi was appointed director of the Maison Russe, a Russian cultural center in Bangui that disseminates Russian propaganda. On December 16, 2022, Sytyi was injured by a mail bomb sent to him while as director of the Maison Russe. Sytyi later stated he opened the package because he believed his son's head was in there, and claimed that the package had a note saying "This is for you from all the French: the Russians will get out of Africa." The package was not the first hate mail received by Sytyi; a package a month prior in November contained a photo of his son and a warning that he will get a package of his son's head if "the Russians don't get out of Africa and leave the doors open to the French." The bombing tore off three of Sytyi's fingers and injured his stomach, forcing him to be flown to Russia for treatment.

Russian Foreign Minister Sergey Lavrov accused France of the attack, and Prigozhin posted to Telegram accusing France as well despite any evidence. French Foreign Minister Catherine Colonna denied the accusations. In March 2023, still hospitalized in Russia, Sytyi stated he wanted to return to the CAR as soon as possible. A later investigation by Russian authorities showed that the package was mailed to Bangui from Togo by a Spanish national named Alex Sevillo Minguenza. Spanish authorities stated that they had no knowledge of Minguenza's actions. In the Central African Republic, the assassination attempt made Sytyi more popular among the people. Vendors began selling t-shirts with his face in 2023, and as he recovered Sytyi began expanding the Wagner Group's information operations into Sudan and Niger. Sytyi's alliance with Hemedti continued through the start of the Sudanese civil war that began in April 2023. In June 2023, Sytyi sided with Prigozhin during the Wagner Group rebellion. He accompanied Prigozhin in the CAR during Prigozhin's tour of African countries working with the Wagner Group.

On February 25, 2024, Sytyi was sanctioned by the European Union for his affiliation to the Wagner Group and their war crimes. The EU investigation culminating in his sanctions noted his connections with the exploitative Diamville diamond company, a front for the Wagner Group. Sytyi's personal chauffeur, Bienvenu Patrick Setem Bonguende, is registered as the head of Diamville. A Wall Street Journal investigation determined that Sytyi's control of Diamville was orchestrated in part by Hassan Bouba, the Central African Minister of Livestock and coordinator between Central African armed groups and Wagner Group.

=== Post-Prigozhin era ===
Following the death of Prigozhin in September 2023, Sytyi and Vitaly Perfilev, the director of Wagner's military operations in the CAR, were assessed to be in control of the Wagner Group's operations in the CAR. In 2023, Sytyi obtained control of the company First Industrial Co., which produces a popular beer in the CAR known as Africa Ti L'Or and the vodka Wa Na Na. In June 2024, Le Monde stated that Sytyi "writes and implements the Russian agenda in Bangui." Sytyi appeared at the opening of a military base in Haut-Mbomou training fighters from Azande Ani Kpi Gbe and introducing them into the Central African Armed Forces.
