= List of companies of the Central African Republic =

Location of the Central African Republic

The Central African Republic is a landlocked country in Central Africa. Despite its significant mineral deposits and other resources, such as uranium reserves, crude oil, gold, diamonds, cobalt, lumber, and hydropower, as well as significant quantities of arable land, the Central African Republic is among the ten poorest countries in the world. As of 2014, according to the Human Development Index (HDI), the country had the second lowest level of human development, ranking 187th out of 188 countries.

== Notable firms ==
This list includes notable companies with primary headquarters located in the country. The industry and sector follow the Industry Classification Benchmark taxonomy. Organizations which have ceased operations are included and noted as defunct.

Notable companies Status: P=Private, S=State; A=Active, D=Defunct
Name	Industry	Sector	Headquarters	Founded	Notes	Status	
Banque Internationale pour la Centrafrique (BICA)	Financials	Banks	Bangui	1946	Commercial bank	P	A
Banque Populaire Maroco Centrafricaine (BPMC)	Financials	Banks	Bangui	1991	Commercial bank	P	A
Commercial Bank Centrafrique (CBCA)	Financials	Banks	Bangui	1962	Commercial bank	P	A
Diamville	Diamond trading	-	Bangui		Affiliated with Wagner Group	P	A
Direction des services postaux de l'Office National des Postes et de l'Épargne	Industrials	Delivery services	Bangui	-	Postal services	S	A
Enerca	Utilities	Conventional electricity	Bangui	1963	Electrical infrastructure	P	A
Groupe Kamach	Conglomerates	-	Bangui	1972	Timber, mines, real estate	P	A
Midas Ressources	Precious metals	-	Bangui		Affiliated with Wagner Group	P	A
Socatel	Telecommunications	Fixed line telecommunications	Bangui	1990	Telecom	P	A

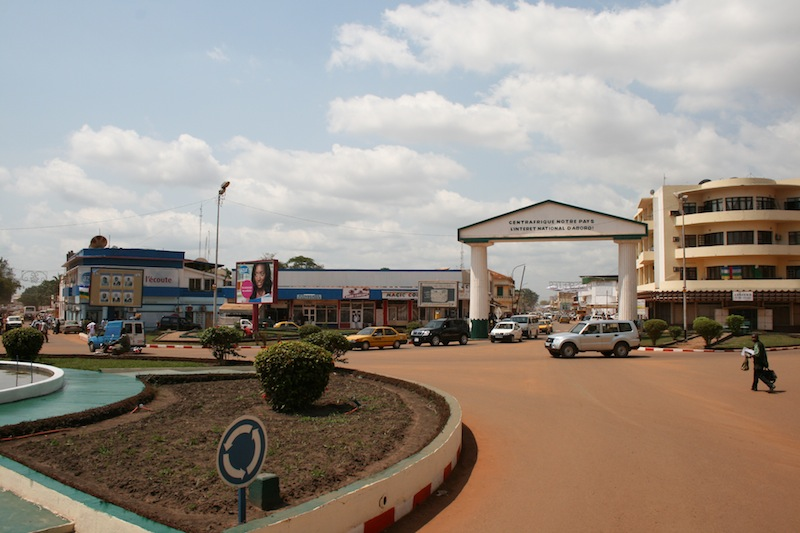
Bangui shopping district.

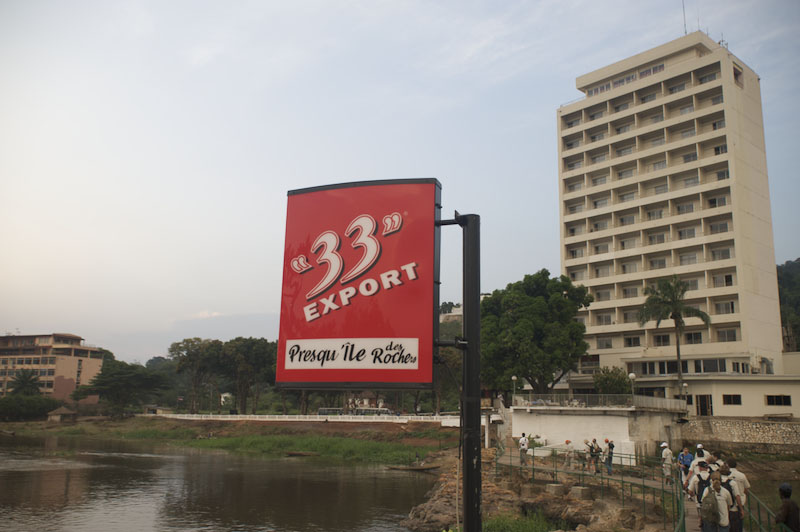
Oubangui Hotel in Bangui.

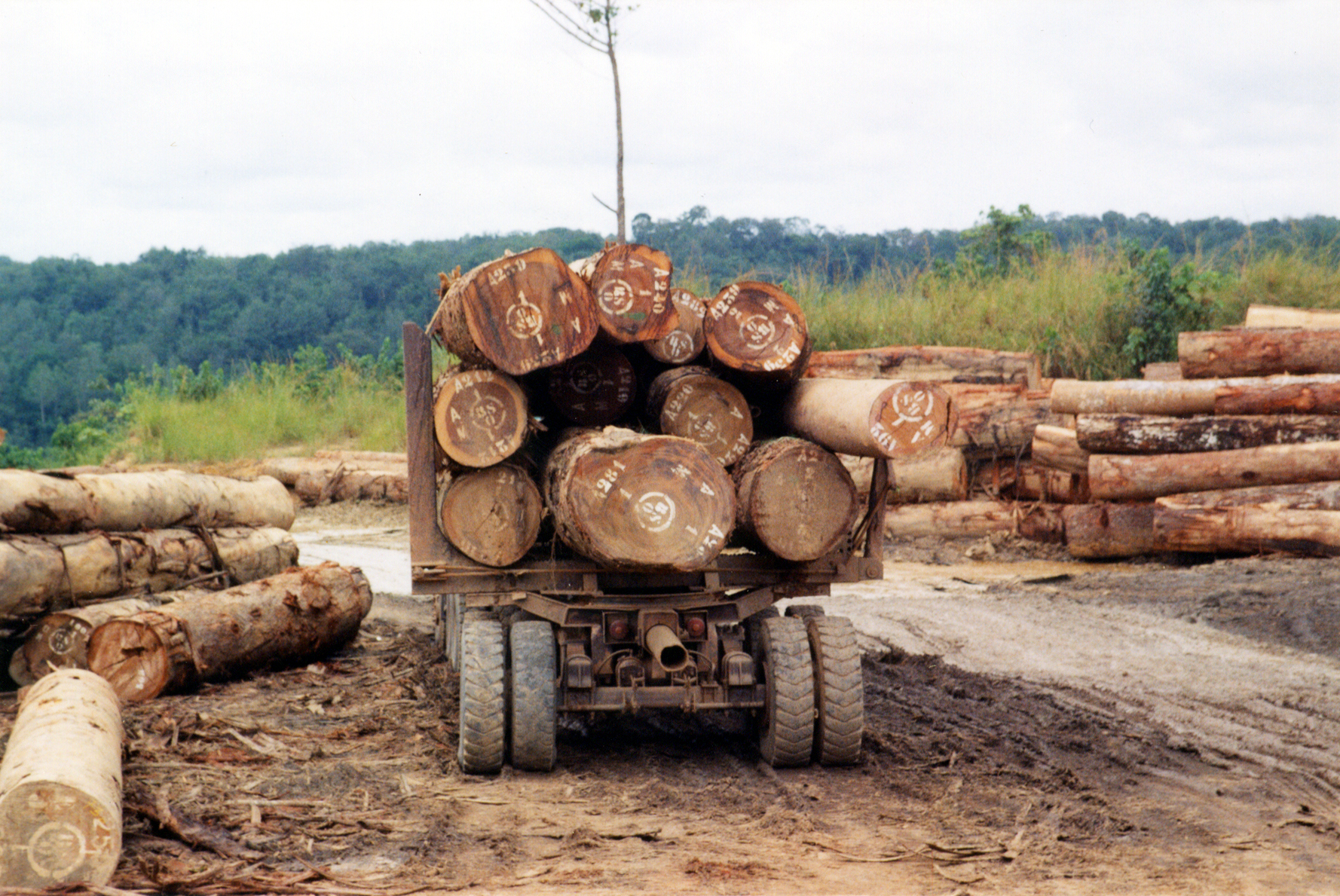
Forestry remains an important contributor to the C. A. R. economy.

== See also ==
- Economy of the Central African Republic
