= Boungou =

Boungou may refer to:

- Boungou, Burkina Faso, a town in Gnagna Department
- Boungou, Central African Republic, a village in Haute-Kotto Prefecture.
