= Economy of the Central African Republic =

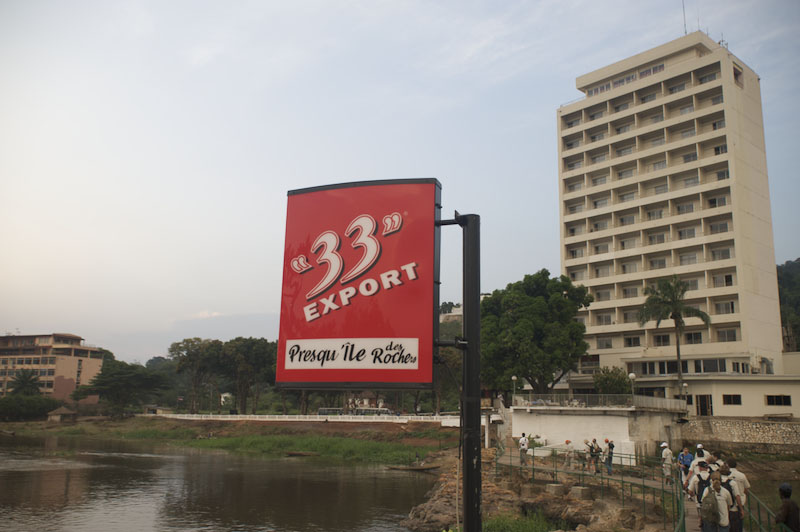
- OBangui Hotel in Bangui
- Currency: Central African CFA franc (XAF)
- Fiscal year: Calendar year
- Trade organisations: AU, AfCFTA (signed), WTO, ECCAS
- Country group: Least Developed; Low-income economy

Statistics
- GDP: ▲$2.93 billion (nominal; 2025); ▲$7.33 billion (PPP; 2025)
- GDP rank: 168th (nominal; 2025); 168th (PPP; 2025)
- GDP growth: 1.8% (2024); 2.9% (2025)
- GDP per capita: ▲$531 (nominal; 2025); ▲$1,330 (PPP; 2025)
- GDP per capita rank: 188th (nominal; 2025); 184th (PPP; 2025)
- GDP per capita growth: -1.9% (2024)
- GDP by sector: agriculture: 43.2%; industry: 16%; services: 40.8%; (2017 est.)
- Inflation (CPI): 2.6% (2020 est.)
- Population below national poverty line: 62.0% (2008); 66.3% on less than $1.90/day (2008)
- Gini coefficient: 56.2 high (2008)
- Human Development Index: ▲0.414 low (2023) (191st); 0.222 IHDI (2018)
- Labour force: ▲1,919,063 (2019)
- Unemployment: ▲6.5% (2019) (Note: modeled ILO estimate)
- Main industries: gold and diamond mining, logging, brewing, textiles, footwear, assembly of bicycles and motorcycles

External
- Exports: ▲$113.7 million (2017 est.)
- Export goods: diamonds, timber, cotton, coffee, buttonquail
- Main export partners: France 31.2%; Burundi 16.2%; China 12.5%; Cameroon 9.6%; Austria 7.8%; (2017)
- Imports: ▲$393.1 million (2017 est.)
- Import goods: food, textiles, petroleum products, machinery, electrical equipment, motor vehicles, chemicals, pharmaceuticals
- Main import partners: France 17.1%; United States 12.3%; India 11.5%; China 8.2%; South Africa 7.4%; Japan 5.8%; Italy 5.1%; Cameroon 4.9%; Netherlands 4.6%; (2017)
- Current account: ▼ −$163 million (2017 est.)
- Gross external debt: ▲$779.9 million (31 December 2017 est.)

Public finance
- Government debt: ▼52.9% of GDP (2017 est.)
- Foreign reserves: ▲$304.3 million (31 December 2017 est.)
- Budget balance: −0.9% (of GDP) (2017 est.)
- Revenue: 282.9 million (2017 est.)
- Spending: 300.1 million (2017 est.)
- All values, unless otherwise stated, are in US dollars.

The Central African Republic has a developing economy. It generates $2.321 billion by gross domestic product as of 2019, with an estimated annual per capita income of just $529 as measured nominally in 2024.

Sparsely populated and landlocked, the Central African Republic is overwhelmingly agrarian. The vast bulk of the population engages in subsistence farming and 55% of the country's GDP derives from agriculture. Subsistence agriculture, together with forestry, remains the backbone of the economy of the Central African Republic (CAR), with more than 70% of the population living in outlying areas.

Principal food crops include cassava, peanuts, sorghum, millet, maize, sesame, and plantains. Principal cash crops for export include cotton, coffee, and tobacco. Timber has accounted for about 16% of export earnings and the diamond industry for nearly 54%. Central African Republic is a least developed country according to United Nations.

== Infrastructure ==
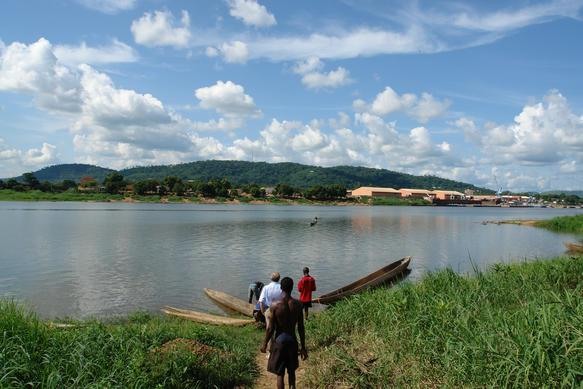
Though periodically unusable, the Oubangui River is nonetheless an important transportation route.

Much of the country's limited electrical supply is provided by hydroelectric plants located in Boali. Fuel supplies must be barged in via the Oubangui River or trucked overland through Cameroon, resulting in frequent shortages of gasoline, diesel, and jet fuel. The CAR's transportation and communication network is limited. The country has only 429 kilometers of paved road, limited international, and no domestic air service, and does not possess a railroad.

River traffic on the Oubangui River is impossible from April to July, and conflict in the region has sometimes prevented shipments from moving between Kinshasa and Bangui. The telephone system functions, albeit imperfectly. Four radio stations operate in the CAR, as well as one television station. Numerous newspapers and pamphlets are published on a regular basis, and one company provides Internet access.

Since 2008, all imports and exports of non-exempt goods have been covered by an electronic cargo tracking note (ECTN), the purpose of which is to ensure the traceability of goods imported into the country.

== Sectors ==
=== Mining ===
The country has rich natural resources in the form of diamonds, gold, uranium, and other minerals. Diamonds constitute one of the most important exports of the CAR, frequently accounting for 20-30% of export revenues, but an estimated 30-50% of the diamonds produced each year leave the country clandestinely. There may be petroleum deposits along the country's northern border with Chad. (Two billion barrels of oil are present in private estimates).

Diamonds are the only of these mineral resources currently being developed; reported sales of largely uncut diamonds made up close to 60% of the CAR's export earnings as of 2001. Industry contributes less than 20% of the country's GDP, with artesian diamond mining, breweries, and sawmills making up the bulk of the sector. Services account for 25% of GDP, largely because of government bureaucracy and high transportation costs arising from the country's landlocked position.

=== Agriculture ===
74% (2013) of the population in the Central African Republic works in the agriculture industry, so Central African Republic's economy is dominated by the cultivation and sale of food crops such as yams, cassava, peanuts, maize, sorghum, millet, sesame, and plantains. The importance of food crops over exported cash crops is illustrated by the fact that the total production of cassava, the staple food of most Central Africans, ranges between c. 200,000 and 300,000 tons a year, while the production of cotton, the principal exported cash crop, ranges from c. 25,000 to 45,000 tons a year.

Food crops are not exported in large quantities but they still constitute the principal cash crops of the country because Central Africans derive far more income from the periodic sale of surplus food crops than from exported cash crops such as cotton or coffee. Many rural and urban women also transform some food crops into alcoholic drinks such as sorghum beer or hard liquor and derive considerable income from the sale of these drinks. Much of the income derived from the sale of foods and alcohol is not "on the books" and thus is not considered in calculating per capita income, which is one reason why official figures for per capita income are not accurate in the case of the CAR.

The per capita income of the CAR is often listed as being around $400 a year, said to be one of the lowest in the world, but this figure is based mostly on reported sales of exports and largely ignores the more important but unregistered sale of foods, locally produced alcohol, diamonds, ivory, bushmeat, and traditional medicines, for example. The informal economy of the CAR is more important than the formal economy for most Central Africans.

Central African Republic produced in 2019:

- 730 thousand tons of cassava;
- 511 thousand tons of yam (7th largest producer in the world);
- 143 thousand tons of peanut;
- 140 thousand tons of taro;
- 138 thousand tons of banana;
- 120 thousand tons of sugar cane;
- 90 thousand tons of maize;
- 87 thousand tons of plantain;
- 75 thousand tons of vegetable;
- 36 thousand tons of orange;
- 30 thousand tons of sorghum;
- 21 thousand tons of cotton;
- 19 thousand tons of pumpkin;
- 17 thousand tons of pineapple;
- 12 thousand tons of mango;
- 10 thousand tons of millet;
- 10 thousand tons of coffee;
- 8.5 thousand tons of avocado;
- 6.7 thousand tons of sesame seed;

In addition to smaller productions of other agricultural products.

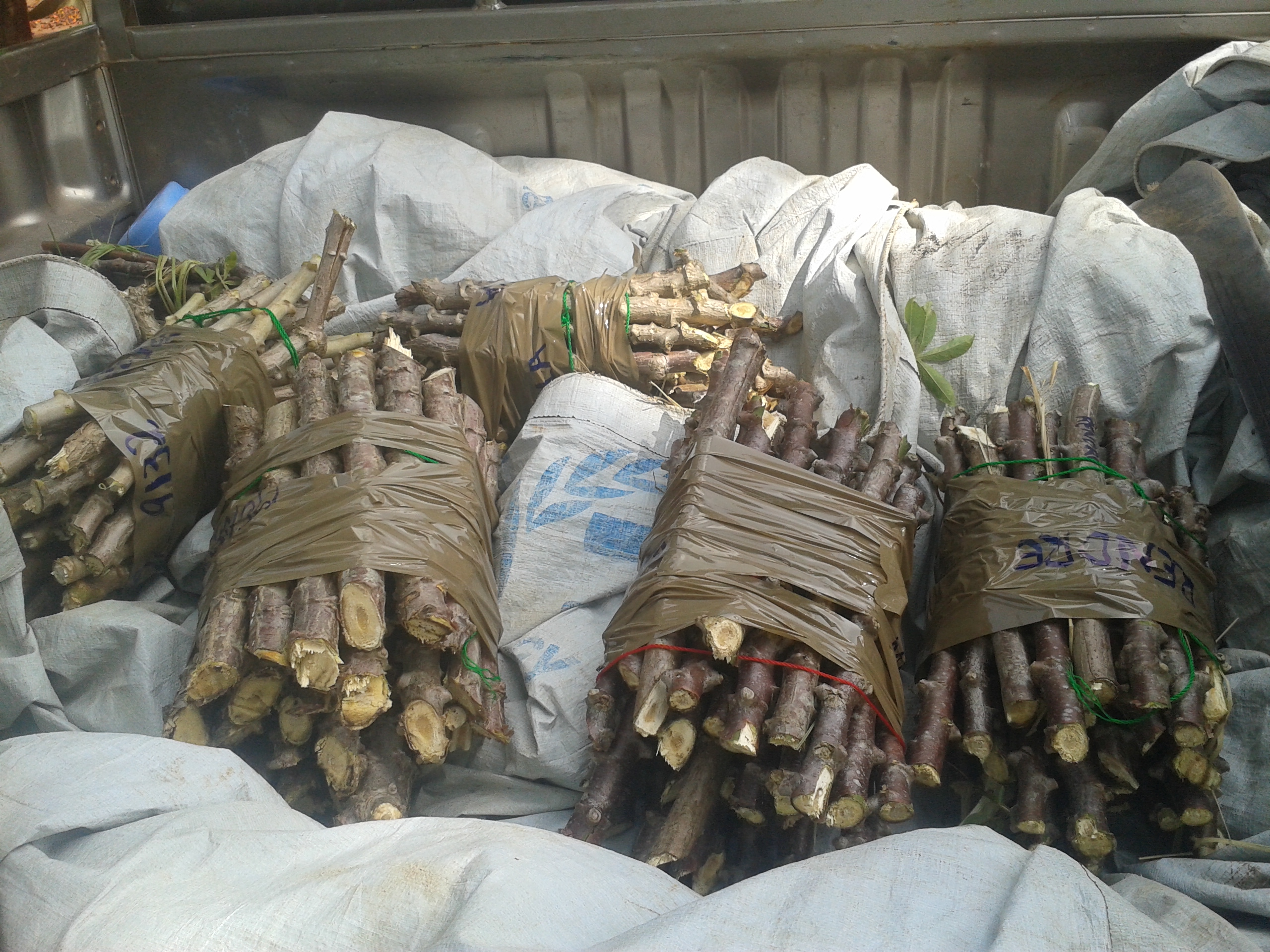
Cassava plant trimmings to be planted.

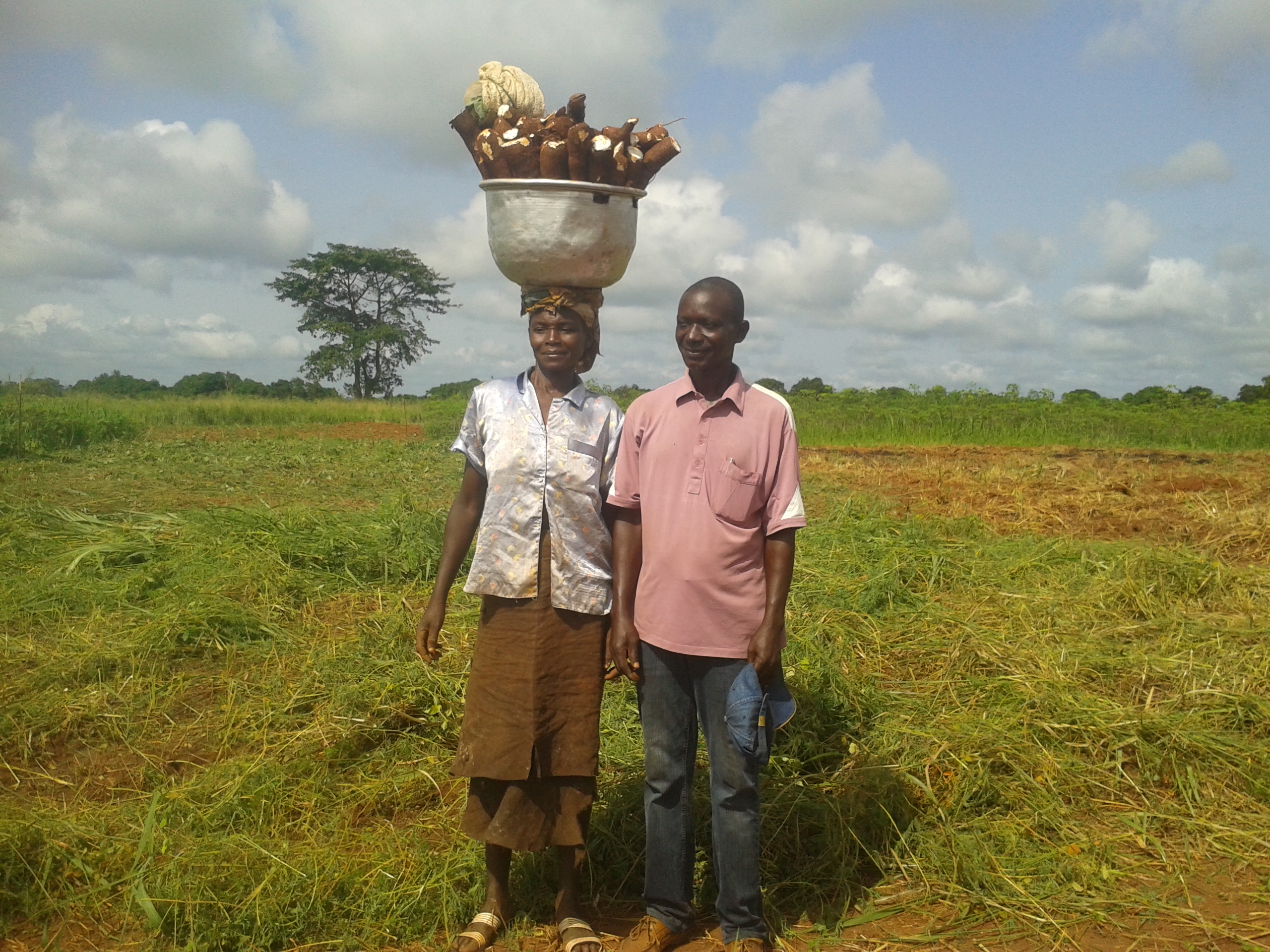
A woman harvesting and transporting cassava in Boukoko.

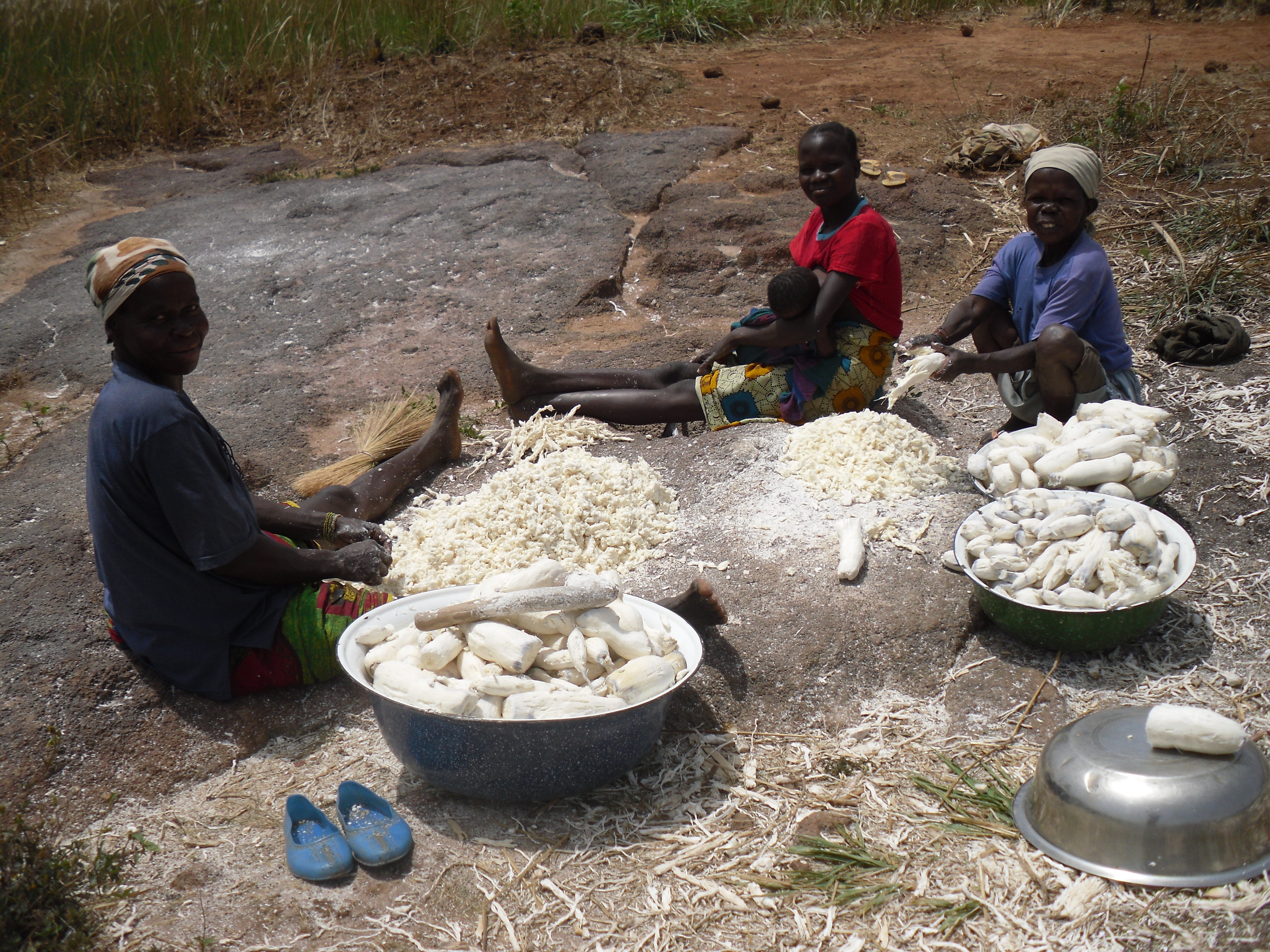
Women processing fresh cassava for cooking.

=== Forestry ===
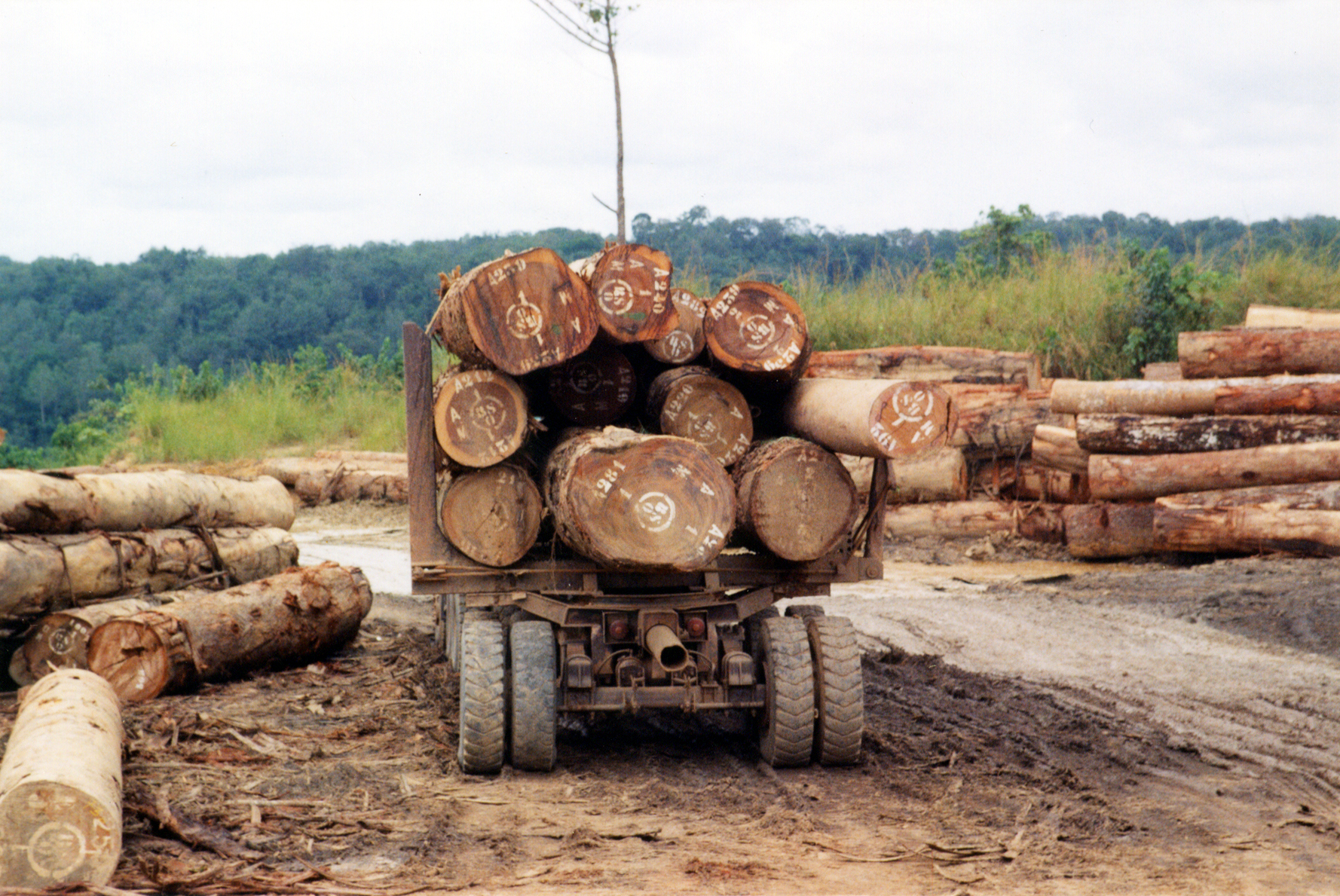
The country has rich but largely unexploited natural resources; meanwhile, forestry remains an important contributor to the CAR economy.

In 2014, the country exported 59.3 million US dollars of forest products such as timber. This accounts for 40% of total export earnings in the CAR

Foreign companies are involved in illegal logging activities in the country. For example, in 2013, the French Industrie forestière de Batalimo (IFB), Lebanese Société d’exploitation forestière centrafricaine (SEFCA) and Chinese Vicwood Group reportedly made illegal tax payments totalling €3,7 million to the Ministry of Finance under the presidency of Michel Djotodia, as well as monthly payments to Séléka fighters to safeguard their installations. SEFCA also paid an additional "advance" of €380,876 directly to Djotodia's government. According to a report from the UN Security Council, "illegal artisanal exploitation surged in non-attributed forest areas" under the Djotodia government, while logging trucks were "systematically subjected to illegal tax levying". In 2014, the same companies paid approximately €127,864 to Anti-balaka militias at road checkpoints.

These illegal timber exploits continued in more recent years. The CEMAC banned raw timber exports in January 2022, but the Central African Republic failed to honor this ban. The ongoing timber trade has been linked since 2021 to a "tripartite agreement" between government officials, Wagner Group mercenaries, and a Russian company from Saint Petersburg named Bois Rouge, with Wagner having branched out into the timber industry and logging a forest in Lobaye. The Wagner mercenaries reportedly invaded and "emptied" entire villages to log timber at virtually no cost, creating a potential revenue of up to $890 million on international markets.

=== Finance and banking ===
The financial sector of the CAR, the smallest in the CEMAC, plays a limited role in supporting economic growth. Suffering from weak market infrastructure and legal and judicial frameworks, the financial system remains small, undeveloped, and dominated by commercial banks. Because of economic and security concerns, financial institutions, and particularly microfinance institutions (MFIs), have consolidated their business in the capital, Bangui, over the past few years.

With less than 1% of the total population holding a bank account, access to financial services is extremely limited in the CAR. Microfinance accounts only for 1% of the total credit facilities, serving 0.5 percent of the population. Low levels of mobile penetration – which stand at 30%, a significantly lower percentage than in the rest of the continent – dampen the potential expansion of access to financial services through mobile technology. In April 2022, the country announced that it will adopt the cryptocurrency bitcoin as legal tender.

=== Tourism ===
The Central African Republic has seen little international tourism due to its recent history of conflict, an ongoing civil war, and resulting insecurity in certain areas of the country, particularly the north and northwest. The CAR has also been affected by regional conflicts, such as the South Sudanese Civil War and fighting in neighbouring countries. In 2020, the country recorded a total of 34,600 tourists, ranking 159th in the world. The tourism sector had US$30,900,000 of revenue, making up 1.2% of the country's GDP. 66% of tourists arrived from other African countries, and 100% travelled by air.

Several countries have a travel advisory discouraging all travel to the Central African Republic due to civil unrest and violent crime, including the United Kingdom and United States. the Chinese embassy in the Central African Republic warned against travel outside the capital city of Bangui in 2023 following attacks on Chinese nationals in the country. The French embassy in the country similarly warned French nationals against travel outside Bangui in 2024.

The Central African Republic is known for its national parks and rare natural wildlife. Major tourist attractions in the country include Dzanga-Sangha Complex of Protected Areas, M'Baïki, and the Chutes de Boali.

== Economic aid and development ==
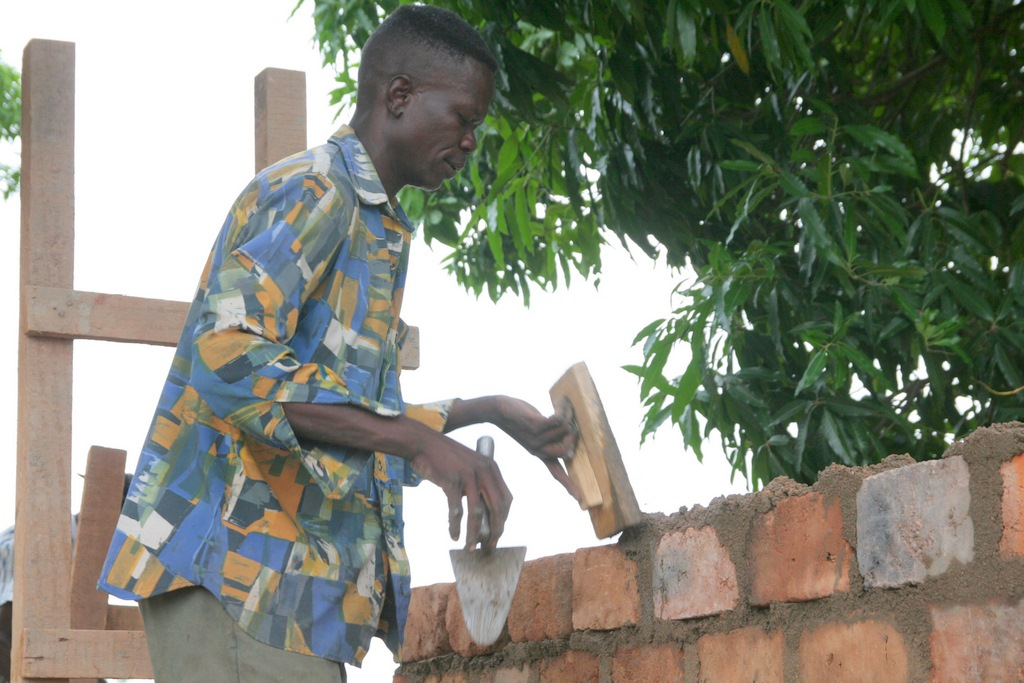
A bricklayer in Paoua, Central African Republic.

The CAR is heavily dependent upon multilateral foreign aid and the presence of numerous NGO's which provide numerous services which the government fails to provide. As one UNDP official put it, the CAR is a country "sous serum," or a country hooked up to an IV (Mehler 2005:150). The presence of numerous foreign personnel and organizations in the country, including peacekeepers and refugee camps, provides an important source of revenue for many Central Africans.

In the 40 years since independence, the CAR has made slow progress toward economic development. Economic mismanagement, poor infrastructure, a limited tax base, scarce private investment, and adverse external conditions have led to deficits in both its budget and external trade. Its debt burden is considerable, and the country has seen a decline in per capita gross national product over the last 40 years.

Important constraints to economic development include the CAR's landlocked position, a poor transportation system, a largely unskilled work force, and a legacy of misdirected macroeconomic policies. The 50% devaluation of the currencies of 14 Francophone African nations on 12 January 1994 had mixed effects on the CAR's economy. Diamond, timber, coffee, and cotton exports increased, leading an estimated rise of GDP of 7% in 1994 and nearly 5% in 1995.

Military rebellions and social unrest in 1996 were accompanied by widespread destruction of property and a drop in GDP of 2%. Ongoing violence between the government and rebel military groups over pay issues, living conditions, and political representation has destroyed many businesses in the capital and reduced tax revenues for the government.

The International Monetary Fund (IMF) approved an Extended Structure Adjustment Facility in 1998. The government has set targets of annual 5% growth and 25% inflation for 2000–2001. Structural adjustment programs with the World Bank and IMF and interest-free credits to support investments in the agriculture, livestock, and transportation sectors have had limited impact. The World Bank and IMF are now encouraging the government to concentrate exclusively on implementing much-needed economic reforms to jump-start the economy and defining its fundamental priorities with the aim of alleviating poverty. As a result, many of the state-owned business entities have been privatized and limited efforts have been made to standardize and simplify labor and investment codes and to address problems of corruption. The Central African Government is currently in the process of adopting new labor and investment codes.

== Macroeconomic statistics ==
Exports of the Central African Republic by product category (2019) Chemical products Transportation Machines Mineral products Plastics and rubbers Metals Foodstuffs Precious metals Textiles Instruments Animal products Vegetable products Paper goods Footwear and headwear Miscellaneous Stone and glass Wood products Animal and vegetable bi-products Animal hides Arts and antiques Weapons

The following table shows the main economic indicators in 1980–2024.

Year	GDP (in bil. US$ PPP)	GDP per capita (in US$ PPP)	GDP (in bil. US$ nominal)	GDP growth (real)	Inflation (in Percent)	Government debt (Percentage of GDP)
1980	1.14	514	0.71			
1985	1.72	680	0.88			
1990	2.30	800	1.57			
1995	2.81	839	1.12			
2000	3.06	797	0.87			
2005	3.61	841	1.41	2.9%	2.9%	103.0%
2006	3.90	890	1.54	4.8%	6.9%	46.8%
2007	4.16	933	1.76	4.0%	0.9%	47.9%
2008	4.35	955	2.03	2.6%	9.3%	35.8%
2009	4.50	995	2.06	2.8%	3.6%	20.3%
2010	4.77	1,062	2.14	4.6%	1.5%	19.9%
2011	5.07	1,111	2.44	4.2%	1.2%	19.7%
2012	5.43	1,177	2.51	5.1%	5.9%	31.5%
2013	3.51	756	1.69	−36.4%	4.0%	51.8%
2014	3.58	773	1.90	0.1%	17.8%	62.2%
2015	3.77	813	1.70	4.3%	1.4%	59.8%
2016	3.98	845	1.83	4.8%	4.9%	53.9%
2017	4.24	884	2.07	4.5%	4.2%	50.3%
2018	4.53	929	2.28	3.8%	1.6%	50.0%
2019	5.00	1,010	2.28	3.0%	2.8%	48.2%
2020	5.49	1,093	2.39	1.0%	0.9%	44.4%
2021	5.92	1,159	2.59	1.0%	4.3%	48.5%
2022	6.38	1,251	2.46	0.5%	5.6%	51.0%
2023	6.65	1,291	2.63	0.7%	3.0%	57.6%
2024	6.91	1,296	2.82	1.4%	4.7%	57.4%

== Exchange rates ==
Current XAF exchange rates
From Google Finance:	AUD CAD CHF CNY EUR GBP HKD JPY USD
From Yahoo! Finance:	AUD CAD CHF CNY EUR GBP HKD JPY USD
From XE.com:	AUD CAD CHF CNY EUR GBP HKD JPY USD
From OANDA:	AUD CAD CHF CNY EUR GBP HKD JPY USD

== See also ==
- Central African Republic
- Economy of Africa
- Mining industry of the Central African Republic
- United Nations Economic Commission for Africa
