= Aïgbado =

- Location in Central African Republic
- Coordinates: 6°53′44.52″N 21°45′43.56″E
- Country: Central African Republic
- Prefecture: Haute-Kotto
- Sub-prefecture: Bria
- Commune: Samba-Boungou

Aïgbado or Aïgbando is a village located in the Central African Republic prefecture of Haute-Kotto.

== History ==
On 21 November 2020 five people were killed and seven injured after clashes between UPC and FPRC in Aïgbado. On 19 June 2021 Russian mercenaries from Wagner Group took control of the village killing 10 people. On 14 July Russians killed four FPRC rebels in Aigbando. On 25 November Russian mercenaries attacked Aïgbado village near Bria killing people and livestock, burning down building and arresting 12 people. From 16 to 17 January 2022 during operation against CPC rebels Russians killed 65 civilians in the village during Aïgbado massacre. On 9 September CPC rebels attacked Aigbando near Bria. After two days of fighting they managed to take control of the town. As of December 2022 the village is under control of government forces and Russian allies.
