= Aïgbado massacre =

Massacre in the Central African Republic Civil War

- Part of Central African Republic Civil War
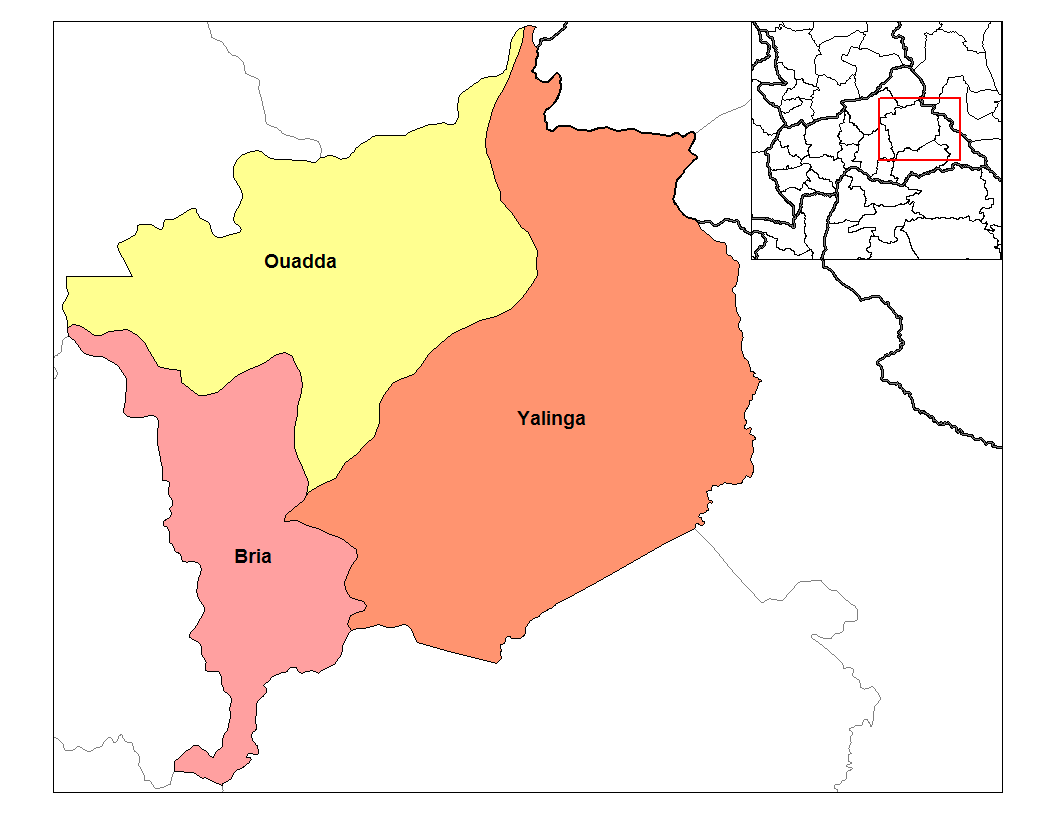
- Location: 6°53′44.52″N 21°45′43.56″E (Aïgbado), 7°21′46.8″N 21°35′47″E (Yanga); Aïgbado and Yanga, Haute-Kotto, Central African Republic
- Date: 16–17 January 2022
- Attack type: Massacre
- Weapon: Firearms
- Deaths: 65 (excl. 2 assailants)
- Injuries: 100+ (excl. 2 assailants)
- Victim: 756 people displaced
- Perpetrators: Wagner Group (Central African Republic) Central African Armed Forces

On 16 and 17 January 2022, at least 65 civilians were killed by Russian mercenaries from the Wagner Group who were supported by armed forces in the villages of Aïgbado and Yanga near Bria in the Central African Republic during an operation against rebels from the Coalition of Patriots for Change.

== Attack ==
On 16 January 2022, shortly before noon, heavily armed Wagner Group mercenaries left Bria towards N'dele and arrived in the village of Aïgbado, situated 75 kilometres from Bria. Upon their arrival, the local population started panicking. The mercenaries started shooting indiscriminately into the crowd. They also burned a dozen homes. Rebels from Union for Peace in the Central African Republic who were present in nearby areas, attacked them injuring four mercenaries. Then Wagner Group moved towards Yanga village 70 km from Aïgbado. Two Wagner group members later died due to their injuries, their bodies were transported to Bangui. They established a base in Aïgbado afterwards and were reportedly preventing anybody from entering or leaving the village, while according to other sources only wounded women and children were allowed to leave the villages. After the event Wagner Group mercenaries laid down landmines to prevent peacekeepers from reaching the village. As of late February, aid workers were still unable to access the area.

At least 65 people were killed. Some of them were shot by bullets from heavy weapons during the attack while other were taken to the bush and summarily executed. Among victims were women and at least two children. Some wounded people were able to reach Bria. According to survivors there were many bodies in the forest. Local fishermen reportedly have fished out at least 14 bodies including women and children from La Kotto river. 756 people were forced to flee to Boungou in the same prefecture. Houses were looted and set ablaze during the clashes.

== Reactions ==
United Nations peacekeepers (MINUSCA) reportedly deployed humanitarian teams to the area to assess the situation and investigate killings. Government of Central African Republic officially denied any civilian casualties during the operation.

== See also ==
- Bria massacre
- Siege of Moura
- Russian war crimes
