= Midas Ressources =

Central African Republic gold mining company

- Industry: Gold mining
- Headquarters: Bangui, Central African Republic
- Owner: Wagner Group
- Website: web.archive.org/web/20220727082141/https://midasrs.com/en/ (July 2022 archive)

Midas Ressources SARLU is a Wagner Group affiliated precious metals company based in Central African Republic.

== Operations ==
The company is based in Central African Republic, with headquarters in Bangui.

It is connected to the Wagner Group.

== History ==
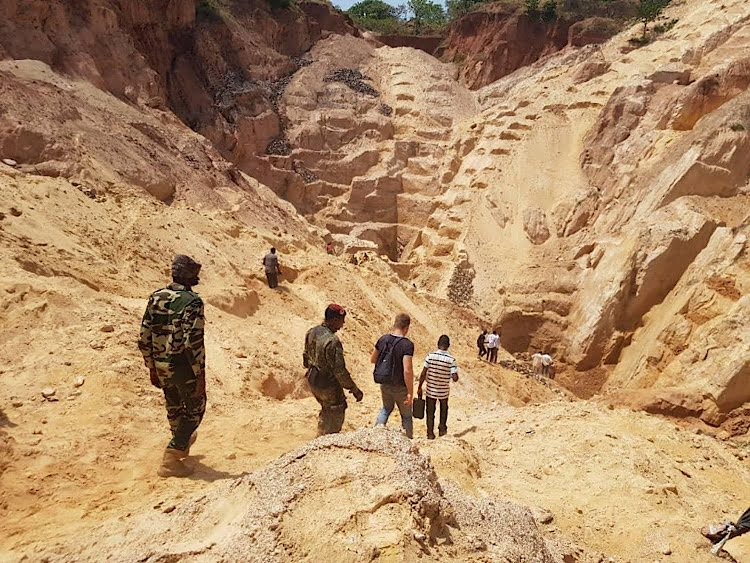
Ndassima in 2020

The company operates the Ndassima mine in Central African Republic.

The United States imposed sanctions against Midas Ressources on June 27, 2023, in the aftermath of the Wagner Group rebellion. Sanctions against the Wagner Group affiliated Diamville were imposed at the same time.

== See also ==
- Diamville
- List of companies of the Central African Republic
- Mining industry of the Central African Republic
- Wagner Group activities in the Central African Republic
