= Ndassima =

Gold mine in Ouaka preferecture, Central African Republic

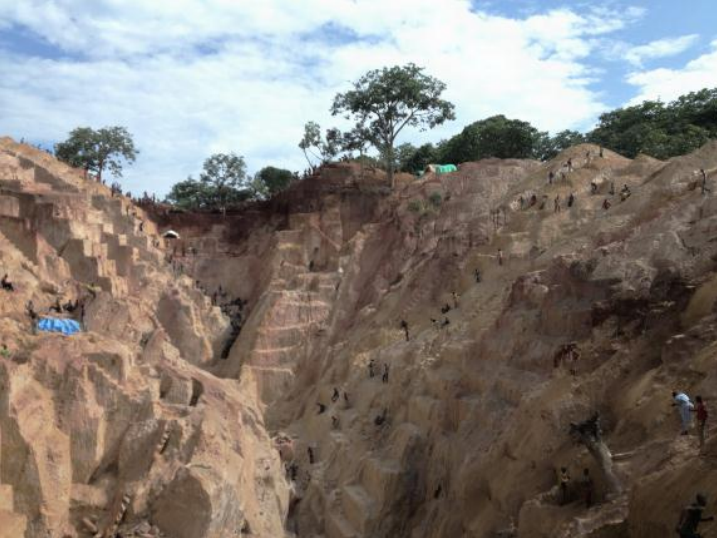
- Ndassima mine in 2014

- Location in CAR
- Location: Ouaka, Central African Republic; 6°09′34″N 20°47′36″E
- Products: Gold
- Type: Open-pit
- Company: de jure: AXMIN Inc. (2006–to present) de facto: UPC (2012–2017), Midas Ressources/Wagner Group/ (2017-present)

Ndassima is a gold mine in Ouaka prefecture in Central African Republic. It is the nation's only industrialized gold mine.

It was taken from the legal owners, Axmin Inc., during the civil war in 2013 before being seized by Wagner Group around 2017.

== Description ==
Ndassima is one of the largest mines in the Central African Republic, covering an area of 138 square miles.

== History ==
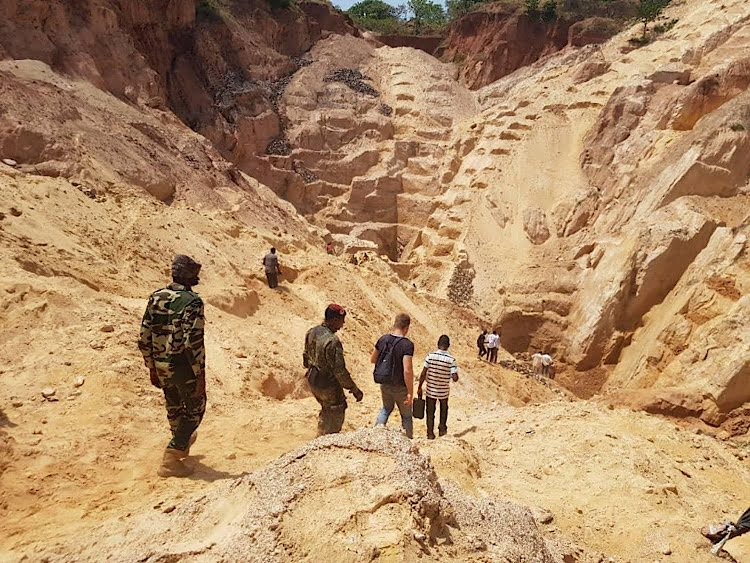
The mine in 2020

Prior to foreign ownership, the mine was dug by hand.

Central African Republic based, Toronto-registered Axmin was given granted a license to operate the mine in 2010.

UPC rebels took control of the mine during the Central African Republic Civil War in 2013.

In June 2013, heavy rains provoked the collapse of the mine, killing 37 miners and injuring many others. On August 22, 2014, the mine collapsed again killing at least 25 people.

Wagner Group took over the mine around 2017, and the mine's owners Axmin reported being notified that their permit to operate the mine was cancelled in 2019. Shortly later the company reported that Midas Ressources was awarded their operating license. Midas brought in heavy equipment and turned the mine into the nation's first industrialized gold mine.

In 2021, in Boyo, Wagner Group fighters massacred villagers who were perceived to be aligned with the UPC.

On 10 February 2021 government forces recaptured the mine. Two days later UPC launched an attack on Ndassima which was repelled by army forces with help from Russian mercenaries. Legal ownership of the asset remains in dispute and Axmin still holds the mining convention pending resolution at law.

== See also ==
- Mining industry of the Central African Republic
