= Groupe Kamach =

KGROUP
- Headquarters: Bangui, Central African Republic
- Number of employees: 901
- Website: http://www.kamachgroup.com/

KGROUP is a Central African Republic company. It was founded by Joseph Ichame Kamach in 1972. It is the largest private employer in the country. The group includes a grocery store chain, a timber and mining company, and a golf course.
