= PMC Patriot =

Russian private military company

Patriot
- Патриот
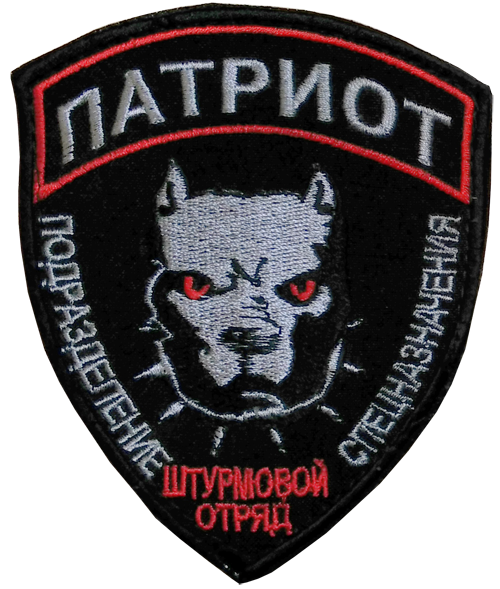
- Dates active: 2018–present
- Part of: Ministry of Defence (Russia)

PMC Patriot (Russian: ЧВК «Патриот») is a Russian private military and security company, which has been deployed by Russia in the Russian invasion of Ukraine and has also conducted operations in Africa.

== Organisation ==
Patriot operates under the command of Russian Ministry of Defence (MoD) and the Military Intelligence Service (GRU). Former Russian Defence Minister Sergei Shoigu is believed to have strong influence over the company.

Unlike the Wagner Group, Patriot focuses more on experienced soldiers with combat experience when recruiting. The mercenaries are also better equipped and trained compared to Wagner's soldiers. According to media reports, Patriot's members receive a monthly salary of 6,300 to 15,800 US dollars.

Following the death of Wagner's leadership, Patriot was named as a possible candidate to profit off of decreasing Wagner group operations.

== Activities ==
- Syria: According to several media reports, members of the military company had been active in Syria from the spring of 2018. Unlike the Wagner group, Patriot mercenaries were said to be more active in the personal protection sector.
- Ukraine: In the wake of the Russian invasion of Ukraine, Russia is believed to be deploying the mercenary Patriot group, as well as the Wagner Group, in the Donbas. A spokesman for the Ukrainian Armed Forces reported that soldiers of the company were spotted during the Battle of Vuhledar.
- Yemen: In the wake of the Emirati involvement in the Yemeni civil war, the UAE has turned to non-western sources against the Turkish & Qatari backed-Yemeni Muslim Brotherhood. The UAE has hired Patriot to support Yemeni Separatist forces.
- Central African Republic: Patriot applied as a private security company to protect gold mines in the Central African Republic. However, the contract was awarded to the Wagner group. According to the TV Rain channel, the mercenary group was also involved in the murder of three journalists investigating secret Russian arms shipments to the African country.

== See also ==
- List of private security and military companies
- Russian irregular units in Ukraine
- Russian invasion of Ukraine
- Redut (PMC)
- Wagner Group
