= Diamville =

Central African Republic diamond company

- Industry: Diamond and gold
- Founded: 2019
- Founder: Bienvenu Patrick Setem Bonguende
- Headquarters: Central African Republic

Diamville SAU is a Central African Republic based, Russian owned, diamond and gold trading company, affiliated with the Russian private military company Wagner Group.

In February 2023, Diamville became the subject of a set of economic sanctions imposed by the European Council against various people and organizations affiliated with the Wagner Group. The company had sanctions imposed by the United States in July 2023.

== Ownership ==
Diamville is a Central African Republic based, Russian owned, diamond and gold trading company. The official registered owner of the company is Central African Bienvenu Patrick Setem Bonguende, who works as a driver for Dimitri Sytyi, a senior executive at the Russian private military company Wagner Group. According to a 2022 joint investigation and report from European Investigative Collaborations (EIC), the French organization All Eyes on Wagner, and the UK-based Dossier Center, Diamville is a shell company owned by Russian militia Wagner Group. Yevgeny Prigozhin, the leader of Wagner Group, dismissed the report as "Western propaganda" and sarcastically claimed that Emmanuel Macron was the owner of Diamville. De Standaard newspaper also reported that "five sources from the diamond sector in Bangui" confirmed Diamville is a Wagner Group front organization.

== History and activities ==
De Standard reported that Diamville was founded in 2019 and exported €132,000 of diamonds from Central African Republic to Belgium in November 2019. The EIC report claimed that in total 1,000 carats of diamonds worth US$12 million were exported from Central African Republic between 2019 and 2021.

In late February 2023, the European Council imposed sanctions against "individuals and entities linked to the Wagner Group" including Diamville for "their role in illegally trading gold and diamonds looted by force from local traders." Other affiliated companies included Lobaye Invest Sarlu in Central African Republic and Meroe Gold and M-Invest in Sudan. The United States imposed sanctions against Diamville on June 27, 2023, in the aftermath of the Wagner Group rebellion. Sanctions against the Wagner Group affiliated Midas Ressources were imposed at the same time.

== See also ==
- Midas Ressources
- Mining industry of the Central African Republic
- Foreign relations of the Central African Republic
- List of people and organizations sanctioned during the Russo-Ukrainian War
- List of companies of the Central African Republic
