= Boungou, Central African Republic =

Boungou
- Location in Central African Republic
- Coordinates: 7°58′16″N 22°2′59″E
- Country: Central African Republic
- Prefecture: Haute-Kotto
- Sub-prefecture: Bria
- Commune: Samba-Boungou

Boungou is a village located in Haute-Kotto, Central African Republic. There is diamond mining in the village located on the bank of the Boungou River.

== History ==
On 17 and 18 February 2020, an ethnic clash between Sara and Goula took place in Boungou. This led the residents to flee the village and take refuge in Bria.

An alleged CPC attacked Boungou on 15 January 2024 when MINUSCA was preparing to leave the village.

== Economy ==
Boungou has one market. The market was constructed with MINUSCA funds under the DDR program.

== Education ==
There is one primary school in the village that was built with MINUSCA funds under the DDR program.

== Healthcare ==
Boungou has one health center.
