= Law enforcement in the Central African Republic =

Law enforcement in the Central African Republic is primarily vested in the country's National Police (also known as the Sûreté Nationale), a uniformed civilian branch oriented almost solely towards law enforcement in urban districts, and the paramilitary Central African Gendarmerie. A third department, the Police judiciaire, is the criminal investigation division of the National Police but has become increasingly independent and is widely considered a separate branch in its own right.

The size of the National Police has generally remained consistent at between 1,000 and 2,000 personnel for several decades since the collapse of the Central African Empire. In 2009 there were 1,350 police officers in the country.

== Organisations ==
The Central African Republic has, in effect, two national police agencies patterned after the French law enforcement system: a civil police and a gendarmerie.

=== National Police ===
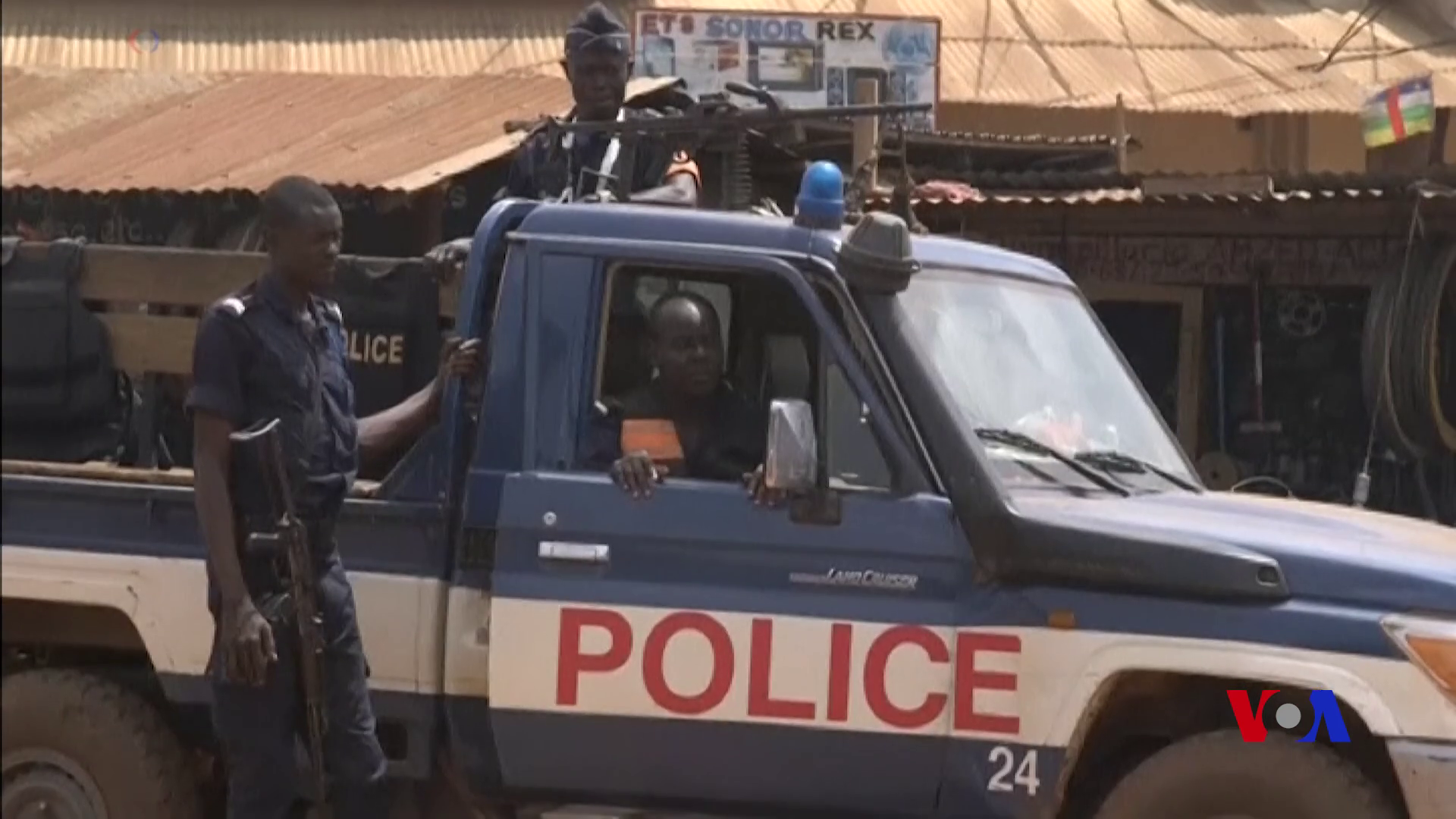
Toyota pick-up of the National Police in Bangui, April 2018.

The National Police, formally known as the Sûreté Nationale, is a uniformed police component based in Bangui and charged with enforcing civil public safety laws throughout major urban districts. As its title suggests, the National Police is organised on the national, rather than the local, level and operates under the control of a central Direction des Services de Sûreté Nationale. Due to limited resources and manpower constraints, the police has been largely restricted to Bangui itself; outside the capital city its influence is mostly nominal. The outbreak of civil war in 2012 also frustrated the ability of the police to enforce the law in outlying settlements being threatened by heavily armed militias. Poor discipline and the frequent delay of salary payments has led to increased corruption within the National Police. According to the United Nations, the force has a low public approval rating due to well-publicized acts of corruption and its perceived inability to carry out its mandate, especially in the northeastern part of the country.

The National Police was founded in 1963, shortly after the Central African Republic's independence from France, with a strength of 315 personnel. As crimes involving firearms were rare in the country at the time, the police were issued few weapons and mostly operated unarmed. The force declined greatly owing to rampant nepotism under the Central African Empire and some subsequent governments.

In 2003, the National Police consisted of nine specialised divisions responsible for border control, administrative affairs, police training, anti-drug trafficking efforts, logistics and human resources, national security, criminal investigations, public safety, and urban counter-terrorism. Reports of widespread violence and looting carried out by heavily armed militants in recent years have led to the formation of a tenth division specifically for countering banditry. This was the first civil police unit trained and equipped to paramilitary standards in the Central African Republic's history, as well as the only one allowed to reissue any weapons it confiscated. Aside from the anti-banditry component, few of the other police divisions carried firearms in 2003, reflecting the longstanding trend since independence for an unarmed, largely non-militarised force.

=== Gendarmerie ===
The Central African Gendarmerie is a military component charged with maintaining internal security throughout all rural districts outside major settlements and towns. It functions as the sole agency responsible for law enforcement in the Central African Republic's least developed regions and has operated both independently and under the auspices of the Central African Armed Forces throughout the country's history. The Gendarmerie is headed by a Director-General and consists of four battalions and three specialist commands. It is unusual in that it has a division responsible for investigating white collar crimes, which is normally a task assigned to civil police in most other countries. The size of the Gendarmerie has generally corresponded to the size of the National Police, fluctuating between 1,000 and 2,000 personnel.

Between 1994 and 2002, the Gendarmerie declined in importance and did not recruit or train any new personnel. In addition, most of its armouries were plundered by mutinous soldiers in 2002, leaving it critically short of equipment. While a number of weapons were later brought out of reserve to compensate for the shortage of firearms and ammunition, most were old and either obsolete or approaching obsolescence.

Following the outbreak of civil war in 2012, the Gendarmerie was retrained and reorganised by the United Nations Mission in the Central African Republic (MINUSCA), with financial support from both the European Union and the African Union.

== Security agencies ==
According to French military archives, in 1963 the French government helped the Central African Republic organise three other state-sponsored security units besides the National Police and the Gendarmerie. These consisted of forest rangers, "hunting guards", and a security contingent for maintaining order and policing near diamond mines. The two former examples apparently ceased to exist between the mid-1980s and 2000, as the government did not express interest in hiring or training new personnel for these occupations. The concept of hiring guards to protect the country's natural resources was revived again in 2000.
