= Mining industry of the Central African Republic =

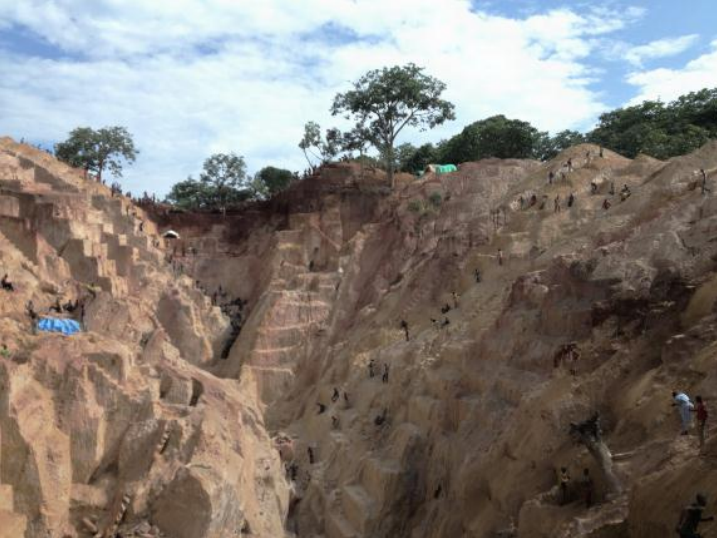
Ndassima gold mine in Ouaka, 2014

The Central African Republic's mineral resource endowment includes copper, diamond, gold, graphite, ilmenite, iron ore, kaolin, kyanite, lignite, limestone, manganese, monazite, quartz, rutile, salt, tin, and uranium. Of these commodities, only diamond and gold were produced in 2006 - subsistence farming was the mainstay of the economy.

In 2006 the World Trade Organization estimated that the mining sector accounted for about 7% of the gross domestic product. Rough diamonds and timber were the country's leading export products.
However, in December 2014, the U.S. Department of Labor report on labor conditions around the world contained a List of Goods Produced by Child Labor or Forced Labor that mentioned diamonds as a good produced in such working conditions in the Central African Republic.

== Production ==
Production of gold and diamonds, which is mostly artisanal, comes from the regions of Berberati, Haute-Kotto, and Haute-Sangha. In 2006, diamond production increased to about 420,000 carats (84 kg) from a revised 383,294 carats (76.6588 kg) in 2005; diamond exports, which were mainly destined for Europe and Israel, amounted to about 416,000 carats (83.2 kg) and were valued at $59 million.

== Structure of the mineral industry ==
Production and trade of diamond and gold are overseen by the Bureau d'Evaluation et de Côntrole de Diamant et d'Or (BECDOR). BECDOR maintains the country's diamond and gold production database and assesses the value of diamond parcels that come from the various diamond-exporting companies (collectively known as bureaux d'achat) that operate in the country.

== Commodities ==
=== Gold ===
Axmin Inc. of Canada continues to explore for gold in the country. A pre-feasibility study for the Passendro Gold Project was completed by GBM Gold Ltd. of the United Kingdom in early 2006. It was followed by a feasibility study conducted by Senet (pty) Ltd. of South Africa, commissioned during the third quarter of 2006. The pre-feasibility study had envisioned an open pit operation with a gravity carbon-in-leach processing plant that would process about 3 million metric tons per year (Mt/yr) of ore with production estimated to be about 6,200 kilograms per year (kg/yr) of gold (reported as 200,000 troy ounces).

Other companies exploring for gold in the country included Prospero Minerals Corp. (formerly Corumel Minerals Corp., before 2006), and Tamija Gold & Diamond Exploration Inc. of the United States, and London-based Pan African Resources plc.

AXMIN Inc. was stripped of its license to mine gold in Ndassima in 2019. It was instead awarded to Midas Ressources, a company run by Wagner Group.

=== Diamonds ===
In 2006, Energem Resources Inc. of Canada continued to focus on the development of suitable diamond prospects within its Bangana, Bria, Kotto, and Quadda concessions in the Haute-Kotto and Bamingui-Bangoran prefectures. Canadian Vaaldiam Resources Ltd.’s plans to explore for diamond-bearing kimberlite pipes in the country continued to be put on hold during the year as the company focused on other priority exploration areas elsewhere in the world.

Other companies exploring for diamond included Pangea Diamondfields Plc (Isle of Man), which planned to invest $3.2 million in a bulk sampling plant for its Dimbi (Basse-Kotto) project concession area, and Gem Diamonds Ltd. (UK), which held exploration and mining permits for the Mambéré river project near the city of Berberati.

=== Mineral fuels ===
The Central African Republic did not produce mineral fuels in 2006 and depended upon imports for its energy requirements. United Reef Ltd. of Canada obtained the rights to a petroleum exploration permit in the country through a "farm-in agreement" with Denver-based RSM Production Corp. in 2004. It was unable to continue with its exploration activities in 2006. The company declared force majeure following the lack of progress in resolving a contract dispute between RSM and the government. The company's exploration permit was for the Doseo and the Salamat basins in the northern part of the country.

=== Uranium ===
Uranium was discovered in 1966 in the Bakouma region in the eastern part of the country, and there was further prospecting in the Berbérati and Bangassou areas; exploitation has not occurred, because of high start-up costs and poor transportation. Reserves were estimated at 18,000 tons.

=== Iron ===
Iron deposits estimated at 3.5 million tons have been exploited in Berbérati and Bangassou, but production has now ceased.
