= Bémbéré =

- Location in Central African Republic
- Coordinates: 7°40′22″N 16°38′43″E
- Country: Central African Republic
- Prefecture: Lim-Pendé
- Sub-prefecture: Paoua
- Commune: Mia-Pendé

Bémbéré is a village situated near the Central African Republic–Chad border in Lim-Pendé Prefecture, Central African Republic.

== History ==
In response to the 1984 Markounda attack, FACA burned Bedam on 4 April 1985 as a punishment for the residents for supporting Ange-Félix Patassé, François Bozizé, and Alphonse Mbaikoua.

Chadian forces attacked Bémbéré on 20 May 2014. Alleged Chad soldiers raided the village and stole five motorcycles, cattle, and other goods on 1 May 2015. Bandit's attack in Bepikassé on 27 June 2015 led Bémbéré residents fled and they returned to the village 2 until 3 days after the incident.

MINUSCA ambushed MNLC in January 2018 and managed to arrest 18 members. Previously, MNLC rebels looted civilian houses who had already fled. Bémbéré was emptied and the residents sought refuge in Bétoko and Bémal in October 2018 due to the MNLC's raid.

In May 2023, the Chadian rebel group was reportedly established a base in Bémbéré. Chadian special forces supported by FACA stormed and destroyed Chadian rebel bases in Bémbéré on 15 May 2023.

Armed Bandits attacked Bémbéré and stole 17 cattle on 13 February 2024, causing the women and children residents fled the village.

== Education ==
Bémbéré has one school.
