= Bepikassé =

- Location in Central African Republic
- Coordinates: 7°36′14″N 16°38′49″E
- Country: Central African Republic
- Prefecture: Lim-Pendé
- Sub-prefecture: Paoua
- Commune: Mia-Pendé

Bepikassé is a village situated in Lim-Pendé Prefecture, Central African Republic.

== History ==
Due to the Central African Republic Bush War, some Bepikassé residents fled to Chad. An armed group whose members wore Chadian army outfit attacked the village on 23 June 2014.

An armed group attacked the village on 10 February 2015. They burned 36 houses, stole cattle, and killed one person. The residents fled to Betoko 1, Betain 2, Bessa, and Bémal and began returning to the village on 17 February. Highway bandits kidnapped 14 people in Bepikassé and RJ group approached them, which led to the clash. Due to the Bandit-RJ clash, the village residents, except two elders, sought refuge in Betoko 1, Bedaya 1, Bessa, Bena, Bekoro, and Betain 2. The Armed bandits stormed Bepikassé on 27 June 2015 and stole cattle and goats, prompting the villagers to flee to Betoko 2, Bémbéré, and Bémal. They only returned 2 or 3 days after the attack.

In September 2023, the villagers could not go to the field as the bandits might rob and assassinate them.

== Education ==
There is a school in Bepikassé. In July 2015, the school reportedly ceased operation.

== Healthcare ==
The village has no health infrastructure, so residents must go to Bémal to seek medical treatment.

== Bibliography ==
- RCA Rapport Préliminaire MSA Axe Bémal - Bepikassé Préfecture de l’Ouham-Pende du 9 au 10 juillet 2015 (PDF) (Report). Danish Refugee Council. 2015.
