= Benamkor =

- Location in Central African Republic
- Coordinates: 7°26′28″N 16°15′53″E
- Country: Central African Republic
- Prefecture: Lim-Pendé
- Sub-prefecture: Paoua
- Commune: Bah-Bessar

Government
  - Village chief: Blaise Kada Mayo

Benamkor is a village situated in Lim-Pendé Prefecture, Central African Republic.

== History ==
In January 2018, the ex-Séléka militia killed 30 people in Benamkor. FACA soldiers attacked Peuhl camp in the village and killed twenty cattle and two people. In March 2023, Chadian rebels occupied Benamkor and they raped and killed a young shopkeeper girl.

A clash between FACA and CMSPR rebels ensued in Benamkor on 8 January 2025.

== Economy ==
There is a market in the village that opens on Friday.

== Education ==
The village has one school.

== Healthcare ==
Benamkor has one health post.
