= Poubati =

Village in Lim-Pendé, Central African Republic

- Location in Central African Republic
- Coordinates: 7°10′20″N 16°23′28″E
- Country: Central African Republic
- Prefecture: Lim-Pendé
- Sub-prefecture: Paoua
- Commune: Banh

Poubati is a village situated in Lim-Pendé Prefecture, Central African Republic.

== History ==
FACA soldiers threw grenades to the protestors in the village's market over cotton prices on 5 April 1985, causing two men, four women, and one child to be injured.

Séléka rebels attacked Poubati on 19 October 2016 and they stole 10 cattle.

== Education ==
There is a school in Poubati.
