= Pounambo =

Village in Lim-Pendé, Central African Republic

- Location in Central African Republic
- Coordinates: 7°8′19″N 16°23′24″E
- Country: Central African Republic
- Prefecture: Lim-Pendé
- Sub-prefecture: Paoua
- Commune: Banh

Pounambo is a village located in Lim-Pendé Prefecture, Central African Republic.

== History ==
Around 10 RJ militias attacked MINUSCA patrols in Pounambo on 25 January 2018. One RJ rebel was killed while MINUSCA did not sustain any casualties. RJ stormed joint MINUSCA-FACA patrols in the village on 28 January.

== Education ==
There is a school in Pounambo. Up until 2021, the school's building was a thatched-roof hut. In 2021, an NGO named Ita Kwe Flavio constructed a brick school building with three classrooms. The construction lasted a year, and the building was inaugurated in January 2022.

== Healthcare ==
Pounambo has one health post.

== Bibliography ==
- UN Security Council (14 December 2018). Letter dated 14 December 2018 from the Panel of Experts on the Central African Republic established pursuant to resolution 2399 (2018) addressed to the President of the Security Council (PDF) (Report).
