= Bébingui =

- Location in Central African Republic
- Coordinates: 7°48′52″N 16°31′36″E
- Country: Central African Republic
- Prefecture: Lim-Pendé
- Sub-prefecture: Paoua
- Commune: Mia-Pendé

Bébingui is a village situated in Lim-Pendé Prefecture, Central African Republic.

== History ==
ANT soldiers attacked Bébingui in mid-February 2008.

An armed group from Chad stormed Bébingui on 7 July 2015, stealing cattle and small livestock. Later, they returned those stolen items. The village received another attack from armed militia on 9 July, causing the villagers fled to the bush for a few days. On 14 July, a clash between two armed groups occurred in the village, prompting the residents to seek refuge in Bedogo 1, Bembo, Bedam, and Bedaya 2.

MNLC rebels attacked MINUSCA patrol forces in Bébingui on 26 January 2018. MINUSCA fought back, and the rebels fled to Chad.

== Education ==
Bébingui has one school. In November 2019, the school infrastructure was reportedly in poor condition.

== Bibliography ==
ACF, ACF (13 December 2019). RCA : Evaluation Multisectorielle à Betoko-Bébingui et sur l'axe Bemal-Bembere (Préfecture de l'Ouham-Pendé) (ACF/13.12.2019) (PDF) (Report).
