= Bémaïdé =

Village in Lim-Pendé, Central African Republic

- Location in Central African Republic
- Coordinates: 7°36′39″N 16°33′5″E
- Country: Central African Republic
- Prefecture: Lim-Pendé
- Sub-prefecture: Paoua
- Commune: Mia-Pendé

Bémaïdé is a village located in Lim-Pendé Prefecture, Central African Republic.

== History ==
Following the 1984 Markounda attack, FACA razed Bémaïdé on 4 April 1985 as a punishment for the villagers for supporting Ange-Félix Patassé, François Bozizé, and Alphonse Mbaikoua.

From 2013 to 2017, RJ had a base in Bémaïdé. An armed Chadian group entered the village on 13 January 2021, prompting the villagers to flee to the bush.

== Education ==
Bémaïdé has one school.

== Healthcare ==
There is a health post in the village.
