= Nzakoundou =

Village in the Central African Republic

- Location in Central African Republic
- Coordinates: 7.3886°N 15.9616°E
- Country: Central African Republic
- Prefecture: Lim-Pendé
- Sub-prefecture: Ngaoundaye
- Commune: Yeme

Nzakoundou is a village in the prefecture of Lim-Pendé in the Central African Republic.

== History ==
An armed group attacked Nzakoundou on 2 January 2022, killing two people and burning twenty houses. Later, they withdrew from the village after being chased by FACA. 3R rebels captured the village from FACA on 22 March 2022. They killed two soldiers, and FACA retreated towards Kowone. Due to the rebel attack, the villagers sought refuge in the bush. Later, FACA recaptured the village.

On 22 December 2023, 21 people were killed by militants. Homes were burned and the village was abandoned. Local residents blamed the Return, Reclamation, Rehabilitation group.

== Education ==
Nzakoundou has one school.

== Healthcare ==
The village has one heath post.

== Politics ==
The village is represented in the National Assembly by Ernest Bonang.
