= Gouzé =

- Location in Central African Republic
- Coordinates: 7°3′56″N 16°22′25″E
- Country: Central African Republic
- Prefecture: Lim-Pendé
- Sub-prefecture: Paoua
- Commune: Banh

Population (2018)
  - Total: 7,897

Gouzé is a village situated in Lim-Pendé, Central African Republic. Until 2020, the village was part of Ouham-Pendé.

== History ==
In 1927, the cave dwellers founded Gouzé after the tribal war ended and the main road construction finished. The cave is located 7 km from the village.

=== Central African Civil War (2012-present) ===
RJ rebels from Paoua attacked Gouzé on 10 November 2016 to steal oxen and they met with heavy resistance from the village's self-defense group. RJ lost about 94% of its fighter in a clash with the self-defense group. Eventually, RJ captured Gouzé on 11 November after receiving reinforcements forces from ex-Seleka. The fall of Gouzé caused the mass displacement of the villagers.

A clash between MNLC and RJ ensued in Gouzé at the end of December 2017. The rebels burned 1100 houses and looted villagers' properties. Consequently, the villagers fled to the bush and just returned to Gouzé on 15 January 2018 after the rebels withdrew from the village on 2 January 2018.

MNLC visited Gouzé around early March 2018 to meet with important local figures. Twenty-four hours later, they kidnapped three and killed two villagers. In May 2018, MPC controlled Gouzé.

As of June 2022, the village is reportedly under the control of the government forces. Nevertheless, 3R threatened to attack Gouzé after a child soldier of 3R from Gouzé deserted from the ranks with heavy weapons and surrendered himself to the government in Paoua by alerting the presence of the rebels. This caused certain people to flee from the village in June 2022. Some were heading to Paoua, while others went to the bush.

== Economy ==
Gouzé has one weekly market.

== Education ==
There is one school in the village. Some of the school equipment was destroyed and looted by the armed groups.

== Healthcare ==
There are two health posts in Gouzé.

== Bibliography ==
- RRM RCA. RCA RRM : Evaluation Multisectorielle Gouzé (Préfecture de l'Ouham-Pendé), Rapport préliminaire (ACF/02.07.2018) (PDF) (Report).
