= Florent Kema =

Central African politician and warlord

Member of National Assembly
- In office 2016–2021
- Constituency: Nana-Bakassa 2

Personal details
- Party: Kwa Na Kwa
- Occupation: Soldier; Politician

Military service
- Rank: Corporal
- Military career
- Allegiance: FACA (?–2013); Anti-balaka (2013–?); Front for the Defense of Public Liberties (2024–present); Military Coalition for the Salvation of the People and Recovery (CMSPR) (2024–present)
- Conflicts: Central African Republic Civil War

Florent Daniel Kema is a Central African politician and warlord.

== Biography ==
Before the Central African Republic Civil War, Kema was a member of Presidential Guard with a rank of corporal. After the downfall of Bozizé government, he joined Anti-balaka and became its leader in Bowaye. As a member of the Anti-balaka group of Bowaye, he led the 2nd attack of Bossangoa on 5 December 2013 and ordered his militias to kill all Muslims. In 2015, he was reportedly served as Anti-balaka regional coordinator.

On the 2016 election, Kema was elected as a member of National Assembly for 2016-2021 period representing Nana-Bakassa 2. As an MP, he was one of the two deputies who opposed the bill establishing the Special Criminal Court, arguing that security had to be fully restored before prosecuting a person, and voted against the removal of Karim Meckassoua from the speaker position. On 29 October 2018, he was reportedly arrested alongside Thierry Vackat and Aristide Symphorien Nampessa when they left the parliament building after Yekatom showed his pistol and fired two shots. The security guards arrested them because they possessed weapons in their cars. However, he denied the arrest report and only heard the news after receiving calls from relatives and friends. Kema was reelected as an MP representing Nana-Bakassa on the 2020-2021 election from Kwa Na Kwa Party. However, the Constitutional Court nullified his victory since he was a former member of Anti-balaka.

Kema later formed Front for the Defense of Public Liberties (FDLP) in early 2024 and became its leader due to his frustration over the court annulment of his victory in the election. Under his leadership, FDLP joined CPC-Fundamental (CPC-F) coalition established by Ali Darassa. However, the group left CPC-F due to the lack of clarification of the coalition leadership. Afterward, FDLP joined the Military Coalition for the Salvation of the People and Recovery (CMSPR) under the command of Armel Sayo and Kema was appointed as its chief of staff on 30 October 2024. Within the CMSPR, he led the group's attack in Bodjomo on 3 February 2025 and Balaka on 25 February.

== Bibliography ==
- ICC (October 2024). WITNESS STATEMENT WITNESS INFORMATION (PDF) (Report). p. 6.
- UN Security Council (15 June 2025). Letter dated 15 June 2025 from the Panel of Experts pursuant to Security Council resolution 2745 (2024) addressed to the President of the Security Council (PDF) (Report).
