= 2019 Ouham-Pendé killings =

- Part of Central African Republic Civil War
- Location: Koundjili, Bohong, and Lemouna, Ouham-Pendé, Central African Republic
- Date: 21 May 2019
- Attack type: Massacre
- Weapon: Assault rifles
- Deaths: 46
- Perpetrator: Return, Reclamation, Rehabilitation
- Accused: Issa Salleh, Mahamat Tahir and Yauba Ousman
- Verdict: Guilty: Issa Saleh: 30 years in prison Mahamat Tahir and Yauba Ousman: 20 years in prison
- Convictions: War crimes and crimes against humanity

On 21 May 2019 at least 46 unarmed civilians were killed by rebels from Return, Reclamation, Rehabilitation armed group in Ouham-Pendé prefecture in the Central African Republic including at least 32 in Koundjili and Lemouna and nine in Bohong. Three generals responsible for killing were convicted of war crimes and crimes against humanity in 2022.

== Attacks ==
=== Lemouna and Koundjili ===
On 21 May 2019, the day of the attack, villagers in Loura reported seeing 14 motorbikes coming from Létélé (where 3R has a base) heading towards Lemouna-Koundjili, but only four returned. Just before noon, 14 motorbikes with around three uniformed elements on each – apart from one non-uniformed element - stopped in Lemouna village. In Lemouna, the villagers recognized some of them as 3R elements who come to the village for the market, or to harass the Fulani in their camp near to the town. This includes the three individuals handed over by 3R leadership to national authorities on 24 May. The 3R elements asked for the local youth leader and the village chief, claiming to want to speak to them in matters linked to cattle, but at the same time, several 3R elements rounded up all the males from the quartiers, tying 22 of them up in groups of two or three close to the village chief's house. Any women who approached were sent away. They had not brought rope with them to tie up the individuals but asked for rope from the villagers and also used the clothes of some of the villagers.

Four of the motorbikes continued to Koundjili: two stopped at the entrance to the village while the other two went to the top. At the entrance to Koundjili, the 3R elements gathered together 13 males instructing them to lie down with their heads to the ground. Unlike in Lemouna, the villagers at the top of Koundjili had fled, leaving just a deaf child and a traveller who had just arrived in the village. The 3R killed these two civilians and looted a shop. Meanwhile, at the bottom of the village one of the group of 13 fled, at which time the execution of the other 12 began. Each person was shot with a bullet, leaving no wounded. A MINUSCA convoy arrived at this moment at the top of Koundjili at which time the 3R elements fled on their motorbikes for Lemouna.

When these same 3R elements then arrived in Lemouna, some eyewitnesses reported hearing the returning 3R elements shout at those who had remained there. Only on the arrival of these elements from Koundjili, did those remaining then proceeded to execute those who were tied up. In Lemouna several individuals still managed to flee and others were wounded. All 3R elements left at this time but some took different routes to return to Létélé.

=== Incidents in the Bohong area ===
At the same time as the Koundjili and Lemouna killing, the 3R also carried out a series of attacks in the area to the south of Bohong. The origin of these attacks appeared to be once again several incidents involving Fulani herders. On 21 May, around 50 3R elements launched an attack against Bohong, killing at least nine civilians directly and wounding four others, with at least six others are believed to have died while fleeing the attack. On 22 May, a MINUSCA delegation convinced the 3R to withdraw from Bohong.

== Aftermath ==
Abbas Sidiki admitted that he sent 3R fighters to the villages on that day, but he did not admit to having given them orders to commit the killings

On 24 May Abbas Sidiki, leader of 3R armed group handed over three individuals from the group to the authorities: Issa Salleh “Bozize” (from Koui), Mahamat Tahir (also from Koui) and Yauba Ousman (from Ngaoundaye). Two of them were former MPC fighters who were based in Kaga-Bandoro until 2016–2017.

On 17 December 2021 first hearing in process against the three accused was held by Special Criminal Court in Bangui. On 31 October 2022 court found three defendants guilty of war crimes and crimes against humanity. Issa Saleh was sentencted to life in prison, while Mahamat Tahir and Yauba Ousman were sentenced to 20 years in prison each. On 16 June 2023 court issued decisions in financial claims of victims ordering convicts to pay in total 22.8 million CFA (nearly 35,000 euros) to 26 victims, including 16 family members of killed people. The court also ordered construction of two wells and memorial in the village commemorating the victims. On 20 July 2023 the sentence of Issa Salleh was reduced from life in prison to 30 years on appeal.

== Sources ==
- This article incorporates text from a free content work. Licensed under Public domain (license statement/permission). Text taken from Letter dated 30 July 2019 from the Panel of Experts on the Central African Republic extended pursuant to resolution 2454 (2019) addressed to the President of the Security Council, Panel of Experts on the Central African Republic.
