= 2016 escape from Bangui =

- Part of the Central African Republic Civil War and Siege of PK5 district
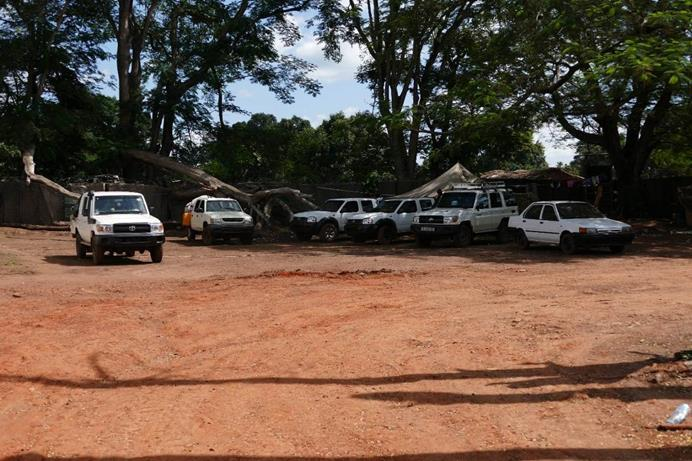
- Vehicles from the convoy seized by MINUSCA near Sibut
Date	12 August – mid-September 2016
Location	Central African Republic
Result	Partial ex-Séléka victory: At least some fighters managed to reach rebel-controlled territory

Belligerents
ex-Séléka	(Central African Republic) Central African Armed Forces (United Nations) MINUSCA; Anti-balaka

Commanders and leaders
Haroun Gaye; Abdoulaye Hissène; Mahamat Tidjani (POW) (WIA)	Unknown

Strength
35 people, seven vehicles	

Casualties and losses
Multiple killed, 16 captured, all vehicles and most weapons lost	Three peacekeepers injured

On 12 August 2016 35 ex-Séléka fighters escaped besieged PK5 district in Bangui and after travelling more than 600 km and clashing multiple times with security forces some of them managed to reach rebel-controlled towns of Kaga-Bandoro and N'Délé, some were killed and 11 were arrested and sentenced to life in prison.

== Events ==
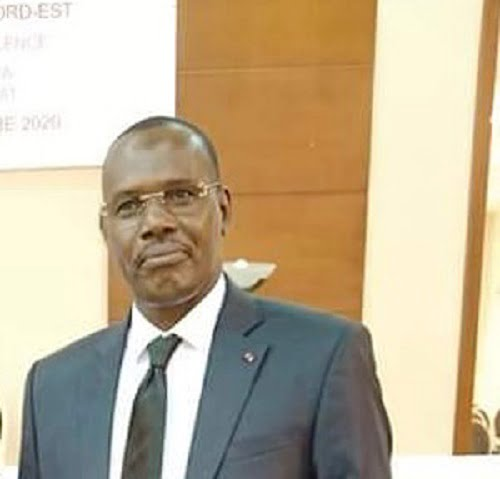
Abdoulaye Hissène, one of rebel leaders who managed to successfully escape Bangui

In the late evening of 12 August 2016, a convoy of seven vehicles (four pick-ups, two cars and his own company vehicle), with 35 heavily armed men from the PK5 neighbourhood in Bangui's 3rd district and the BSS camp aboard, left Bangui. The convoy was led by Abdoulaye Hissène, Haroun Gaye and Hamit Tidjani and also included fighters Faraz, Asso and Pakim. These individuals had convinced some ex-Séléka fighters who had been living in the BSS camp for three years and were frustrated with the lengthy disarmament, demobilization, repatriation and reintegration process, to join them to the “General Assembly” in Bria. Thereafter, it was envisaged that some armed fighters would return to their home towns, while others would join FPRC forces under Noureddine Adam in Ndélé. According to gendarmes and MINUSCA forces there were several women and children in the vehicles along with the fighters. All vehicles in the convoy were painted white, in order to resemble MINUSCA vehicles One vehicle had been stolen from the United Nations Children's Fund (UNICEF).

=== Road from Bangui to Sibut ===
The convoy left PK5 district at 20:00 Central African Time. At 21:00 they arrived at residence of Djono Abba, where they tried to convince him to join them. After half an hour of negotiations he refused to follow the convoy and they left. A few minutes later they reached the barrier at PK12 manned with four soldiers, where gendarmes asked them for purpose of their travel. The driver of the first vehicle told the gendarme to speak to the driver of the fourth vehicle. At this point first vehicle broke the barrier at full speed while other vehicles fired into the air, causing gendarmes and soldiers to flee. One of the fighters, Guy Laurent Mbériot, fell from the vehicle and was subsequently captured by MINUSCA. One of young shopkeepers who was present there phone Anti-balaka fighters in Damara to stop the convoy. One shopheekeper, Moussa Wahanda, was injured during the clashes.

The convoy forced its way through and continued along the Sibut-Dékoa road. At the Guerengou checkpoint, between Bangui and Damara, Hissène explained to the gendarmes that he was on a disarmament, demobilization, repatriation and reintegration awareness-raising mission and was granted free passage.

=== Clash at Damara ===
On the road into Damara, gendarmes who had been alerted by their colleagues from PK12 set up a barricade and called in FACA soldiers from Damara as well as local Anti-balaka soldiers. After less than an hour of exchange of fire, the convoy forced its passage through the barricade. One ex-Séléka fighter who fell off a truck was killed by anti-balaka fighters. The inhabitants of this town fled to take refuge in the bush. Lacking ammunition and outnumbered, security forces could not pursue the convoy, which was then able to stop in Damara to change the tires of some vehicles. After the brigade commander of the gendarmerie had alerted MINUSCA in Damara, one MINUSCA vehicle left the military base, but arrived at the scene only after the confrontation had taken place. Upon arrival at the halted convoy, the MINUSCA commander saw that many ex-Séléka fighters were wounded, but judged that an intervention would be too risky. The convoy was able to repair all but one of the vehicles and resumed its journey. The national gendarmerie seized the abandoned vehicle belonging to Gaye but armed anti-balaka fighters forced the gendarmes to hand over the vehicle the following day.

=== Interception near Sibut ===
In Sibut, MINUSCA received orders in time to block the convoy and disarm and arrest the ex-Séléka fighters. At 5 a.m. on 13 August, MINUSCA stopped the convoy 40 km south of Sibut in Galafondo village and initiated negotiations with Hissène. Among the 34 remaining men, two had died and several were wounded. The ex-Séléka fighters were willing to hand over heavy weapons but wanted to keep some of their light weapons to defend themselves against anti-balaka. MINUSCA rejected the proposal and insisted on full disarmament. While negotiations were ongoing, the arrival of a MINUSCA helicopter spread panic among the ex-Séléka fighters who fled into the bush. MINUSCA was able to arrest 11 fighters and seize a significant amount of weapons and ammunition and all vehicles. According to minister of transport Théodore Jousso, two fighters were killed during this fight and four were injured including Hamed Tidjani. Four wounded fighters were evacuated to Bangui hospital for medical assistance, and six were brought to the MINUSCA base in Sibut before being handed over to the national authorities. Three Burundian blue helmets were wounded during this operation.

== Aftermath ==
On 17 August 2016 it was reported that PK5 armed groups fired into the air after some ex-Seleka fighters managed to reach Kaga-Bandoro.

The escape of the other fighters, including Hissène, created insecurity on and around the Sibut-Dékoa-Kaga-Bandoro road until mid-September. Killings of several civilians in the area have been attributed to the ex-Séléka fugitives in search of food and supplies. Fugitives also took villagers hostage to carry looted goods and to show them the way. Released hostages recognized Hissène as the fugitives’ leader and confirmed that many were carrying weapons. On 24 August it was reported that groups of six fighters from the convoy stopped in Katakpa commune near Dekoa asking local inhabitants how to reach Kaga-Bandoro.

Later the fugitives arrived at Cotonaffoh village where they took hostages to show them location of transhumance corridors which they sued to arrive at Bedanmbor crossroads. lacking direction they arrived in Woulo village 3 km from Dekoa where they kidnapped more people alerting local self-defense forces. On 3 September 2016 a clash between the self-defense group from Nangayan village and fugitives resulted in the death of two villagers (including the village chief), and a third unidentified person, presumed ex-Séléka whose body was handed over to local authorities in Dékoa by MINUSCA. Later in the night from Saturday to Sunday, a unit of the Burundian MINUSCA battalion was attacked 5 km north of Dekoa by a column of ex-Séléka motorcycles trying to force their way south to pick up the escapees. MINUSCA soldiers returned fire. One of the attackers was killed and three motorcycles were seized. Two Burundian soldiers were seriously wounded during the fighting and have since received intense treatment at the MINUSCA clinic.

Anti-balaka fighters allegedly attacked and killed a number of escapees. According to several sources officials in Bangui had alerted anti-balaka forces about the presence of ex-Séléka elements in the Sibut-Dékoa area. Eventually Hissene and Gaye managed to reach N'dele by 8 September.

=== Arrested fighters ===
- Start date: February 16, 2016
- Date decided: February 28, 2016
- Charges: Criminal association; Illegal possession of weapons; Crimes against the State security; Rebellion; Destruction of public buildings
- Verdict: Four accused: Charges dismissed; 12 accused: Acquitted of destruction of public buildings; Guilty of all other charges
- Convictions: 11 accused: Life in prison; Ahamat Aroun Kamiss: 10 years in prison
- Judge: Alfred Rock Ngoumbré

The 11 men detained by MINUSCA between Damara and Sibut and the personnel captured thereafter in the bush and in Bangui were all handed over to the national gendarmerie — some after several weeks of extensive medical care at the MINUSCA hospital. The men were charged with criminal association, illegal possession of weapons, crimes against the State security and rebellion, and all but one were put under precautionary detention in the Ngaragba prison centre and Camp Deroux — this in spite of their expressed fear of falling victim to anti-balaka actions inside the prison. Additional fighters were later captured in bush bringing the total to 16.

On 22 February 2018 the court interrogated two detainees, Moustapha Mahamat and Youssouf Ahmat as well as witness Moussa Wahanda. On 26 February the court interrogated six of the detainees, Abdel Nebou, Ahamat Issa, Imael Issa, Mahamat Salé, Laurent Mbériot and Issène Abakar. On 27 February accused Nassour Amine was interrogated. He was stationed at BSS camp in Bangui and travelled in last of the seven vehicles. He was accused of taking part in aplnning of the escape.

On 28 February 2018 all of them were sentenced by court. Out of 16 tried, four of them were released, 11 (including Ahamat Tidjani, Hissen Abakar, Mahamat Sallé and Youssouf) were sentenced to life in prison while one (Ahamat Aroun Kamiss) was sentenced to 10 years in prison.

== List of participants in the convoy (incomplete) ==
=== Successfully escaped ===
1. Haroun Gaye
2. Abdoulaye Hissène

=== Arrested ===
1. Ahamat Tidjani
2. Hissène Abakar
3. Mahamat Sallé
4. Youssouf Mahamat
5. Abdoulaye Djibril Yacoub
6. Mahamat Saleh Assane
7. Moustapha Mahamat
8. Ismael Issa
9. Nassour Amine Mahamat
10. Laurent Mbério(t), alias « Moussa »
11. Abdel Kader
12. Ahamat Aroun Kamiss

== Sources ==
- This article incorporates text from a free content work. Licensed under Public domain (license statement/permission). Text taken from Letter dated 5 December 2016 on the Central African Republic extended pursuant to Security Council resolution 2262 (2016) addressed to the President of the Security Council, Panel of Experts on the Central African Republic.
