= Ndim =

- Location in Central African Republic
- Coordinates: 7°16′6″N 15°46′16″E
- Country: Central African Republic
- Prefecture: Lim-Pendé
- Sub-prefecture: Ndim
- Commune: Ndim

Government
  - Sub-Prefect: Evariste Ganamo
  - Mayor: Josephine Helari

Population (2017)
  - Total: 10,049

Ndim is a village located in Lim-Pendé, Central African Republic.

== History ==
Around 2002–2003, an armed group from Chad looted a cotton factory in Ndim.

In mid-February 2016, 19 MPC fighters entered Ndim. Responding to the presence of MPC fighters, at first MINUSCA civil affairs representative visited Ndim and asked them to behave well. However, later MINUSCA commanders went to Ndim and issued an ultimatum to the MPC to leave the village within 48 hours. They burned houses and markets and later left Ndim. 3R rebels entered Ndim on 6 December 2016. This caused the locals to flee to the bush.

FACA returned to Ndim on 16 May 2021, seven years after the village was controlled by armed groups. Ten days later, 3R attacked the FACA outpost at the city entrance and wounded one soldier. Responding to the attack, some locals fled to the bush while some sought refuge at the local catholic church. 3R militias attacked the FACA position in Ndim on 23 June 2021. The soldiers managed to repel the attack with the assistance of Bangladesh forces.

On 28 June 2021, due to the lack of ammunition logistics, FACA soldiers left the village and headed to Bang and Bocaranga, leaving only the Bangladesh contingent of MINUSCA who guarded Ndim. However, many villagers decided to flee from Ndim to Cameroon due to the fear of reprisals of rebels' attack and distrust of the Bangladesh contingent in providing security in case 3R occupied the village again.

== Administration ==
Ndim is divided into 15 neighborhoods:

- Ndim Pana
- Ndim Béné
- Ndim Mbilara
- Ndim Village
- Ndim Vatican
- Ndim Carrefour 1
- Ndim Carrefour 2
- Ndim Batalimo
- Ndim Mbissem
- Camp Mission
- Nzoro Kounang
- Ndim Sococa
- Larra
- Ndim Ecole
- Ndim vatican 3

== Economy ==
There is a market in the village.

== Education ==
There are two schools in Ndim: the Mixed School of Ndim and Sainte Rosselo Catholic School.

== Healthcare ==
Ndim has one health center.
