= Central African Republic–Chad border =

International border

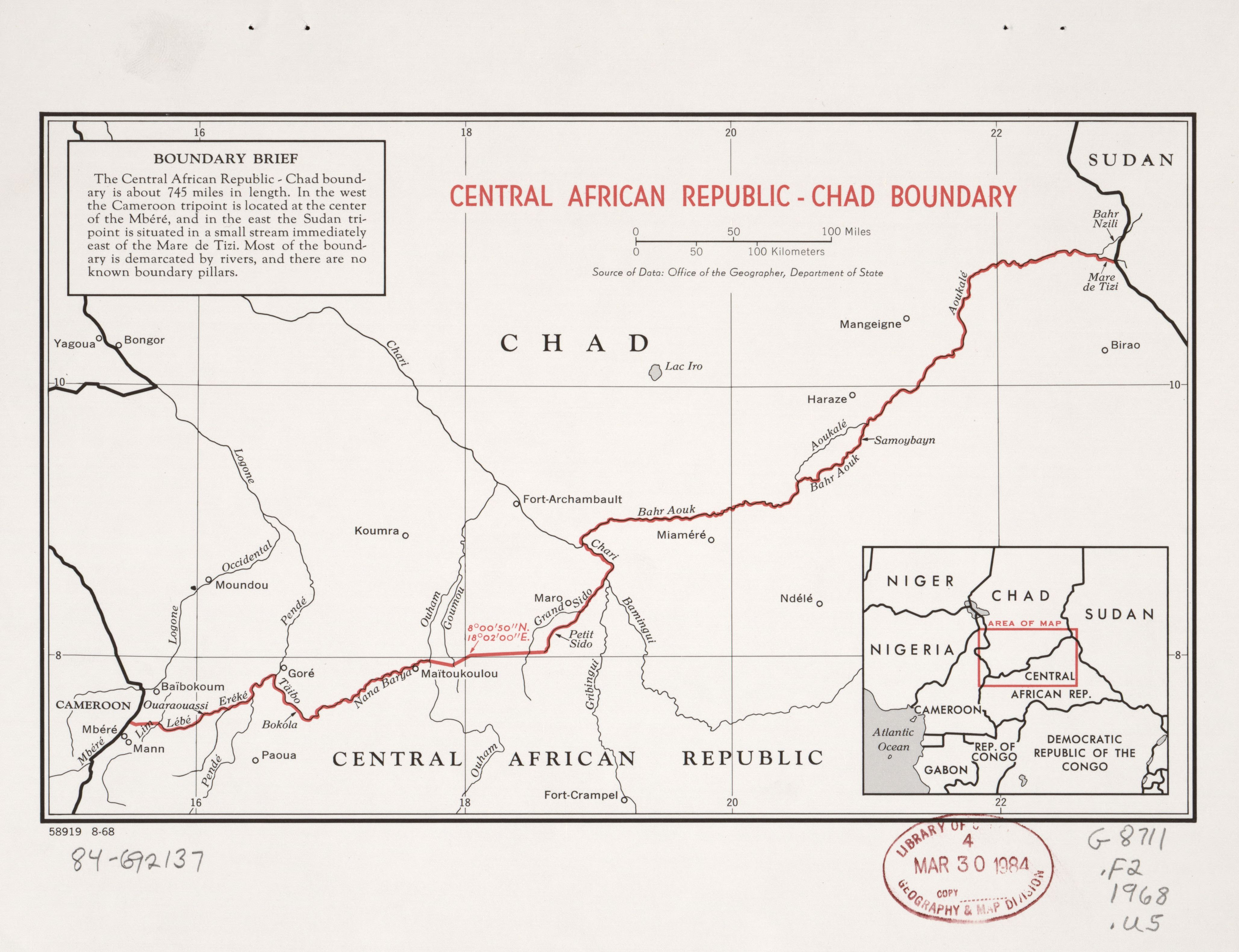
Map of the CAR-Chad border

The Central African Republic–Chad border is 1,556 km (987 mi) in length and runs from the tripoint with Cameroon in the west, to the tripoint with Sudan in the east.

== Description ==
The border begins in the west at the tripoint with Cameroon, located in the Mbéré River about 15 km (9 m) NE of the Central African town of Mbéré. Two short, straight lines then proceed eastwards, before reaching the Lébé river; the border then proceeds eastwards utilising the following rivers: the Ouaraouassi, Eréké, Pendé, Taibo, Bokola and the Nana Barya, until the latter joins the Ouham River. Three straight lines then form an overland section of the boundary, until reaching the Petit Sido river, whereupon it follows the following rivers all the way to the Sudanese tripoint: the Grand Sido, Chari, Bahr Aouk, Samoybayn (also known as the Madeam), Aoukalé and the Mare de Tizi.

== History ==
The border first emerged during the Scramble for Africa, a period of intense competition between European powers in the later 19th century for territory and influence in Africa. The area that is now the Central African Republic has been settled for at least 8,000 years. The process culminated in the Berlin Conference of 1884, in which the European nations concerned agreed upon their respective territorial claims and the rules of engagements going forward. As a result of this France gained control of the upper valley of the Niger River (roughly equivalent to the areas of modern Mali and Niger), and also the lands explored by Pierre Savorgnan de Brazza for France in Central Africa (roughly equivalent to modern Gabon and Congo-Brazzaville). From these bases the French explored further into the interior, eventually linking the two areas following expeditions in April 1900 which met at Kousséri in the far north of modern Cameroon. These newly conquered regions were initially ruled as military territories. By 1903 the areas that now make up Gabon and Congo-Brazzaville (then called Moyen-Congo, or Middle Congo) were united as French Congo (later split), with areas further north organised into Ubangi-Shari (modern Central African Republic) and Chad military territory; the latter two areas were merged in 1906 as Ubangi-Shari-Chad. Around this time two main areas of French colonisation were organised into the federal colonies of French West Africa (Afrique occidentale française, abbreviated AOF) and French Equatorial Africa (Afrique équatoriale française, AEF). In 1914 Chad was detached from Ubangi-Shari and became a separate colony within AEF. Prior to the Second World War the boundary between Ubangi-Shari and Chad was aligned differently, with large areas of south-west Chad included within Ubangi-Shari (including the large towns of Moundou and modern Sarh), and areas of modern CAR's Vakaga prefecture within Chad. It appears that the current alignments was finalised in the early 1940s. France gradually granted more political rights and representation for the constituent territories of the two African federations, culminating in the granting of broad internal autonomy to each colony in 1958 within the framework of the French Community. Eventually, in August 1960, both Chad and the Central African Republic declared full independence and their mutual frontier thus became an international one between two independent states.

Since 2003 the border has been crossed by thousands of Central African refugees fleeing the Central African Republic Bush War and later the Central African Republic Civil War. The Chadian military currently has a large presence in CAR and has repeatedly crossed the border in an attempt to secure the frontier.

== Settlements near the border ==
=== Central African Republic ===
- Bémal
- Bétoko
- Gaoundaye
- Nzakoundou
- Markounda
- Bélé
- Maissou
- Maïtoukoulou
- Golongoso
- Garba
- Tissi

=== Chad ===
- Bédara Lal
- Odoumia
- Goré
- Kaba
- Goubeti
- Gondey
- Tangaray
- Ngoide
- Makoua
- Kouga
- Dangaousi

== See also ==
- Central African Republic–Chad relations
