= Bohong =

- Location in Central African Republic
- Coordinates: 6°29′33″N 15°38′51″E
- Country: Central African Republic
- Prefecture: Ouham-Pendé
- Sub-prefecture: Bocaranga
- Commune: Bocaranga

Population (2020)
  - Total: 14,604

Bohong is a town located in Ouham-Pendé Prefecture, Central African Republic.

== History ==
Séléka occupied the town on 27 April 2013. In Bohong, Séléka fighters looted civilian belongings and erected numerous roadblocks around the town to extort money from the people. Those who could not pay the passing fee were ordered to drink contaminated water and roll around in the mud. These bad treatments led the local youth to create a self-defense group named Young Archers.

On 16 August 2013, Séléka arrested a young man in Bohong and transferred him to a local base. Young Archers militia responded to it by attacking Séléka forces. Four Séléka members died and many injured. Responding to the death of its members, Seleka sent reinforcement forces from Bocaranga, Ngaoundaye, and Paoua to Bohong and clash continued until 19 August 2013. During the three-day battle, Seleka burned thousands of houses and looted civilian and church properties. Around 50 people were killed. As a result, Bohong was only inhabited by Muslims and Seleka while the non-Muslim residents fled the town.

Anti-balaka militias attacked Bohong and killed 27 civilians, mostly Muslims, on 12 December 2013. Due to this incident, all Muslims left Bohong. In January 2014, the town was under control of HCRRN.

Fifty 3R rebels attacked Bohong on 21 May 2019. They killed nine and wounded four civilians. Local residents fled to the bush, and some sought refuge in Bouar. On 22 May, 3R withdrew from Bohong after the MINUSCA persuasion. With MINUSCA's presence in the town, Bohong residents returned to their town.

3R raided Bohong on 14 September 2020 and looted the town hall. The raid caused the local residents to seek refuge in the bush.

FACA and Wagner's forces visited Bohong on 25 October 2021. They forced the worshipers to get out of the church. When they left, Wagner and FACA arrested every male congregant. Afterward, they were taken to Bouar.

== Economy ==
There is a market in the town that is only open on Friday. The town is a major cattle producer in Ouham-Pendé.

== Education ==
The town has three schools, two of them are private, and a school of general education.

== Healthcare ==
Bohong has two health centers run by Catholic and Lutheran missions. Bohong Catholic health center is managed by nuns and has few beds, while the Lutheran health center is operated by the local staff and has 16 beds.

== See also ==
- 2019 Ouham-Pendé killings

== Bibliography ==
- ACF (September 2020). Evaluation Multisectorielle (MSA) RRM. Localité : Bohong. Commune : Mbili. Sous-préfecture : Bocaranga / Préfecture : Ouham Pende (PDF) (Report).
- Report of the Mapping Project documenting serious violations of international human rights law and international humanitarian law committed within the territory of Central African Republic between January 2003 and December 2015 (PDF) (Report). MINUSCA. May 2017.
