= Bavara =

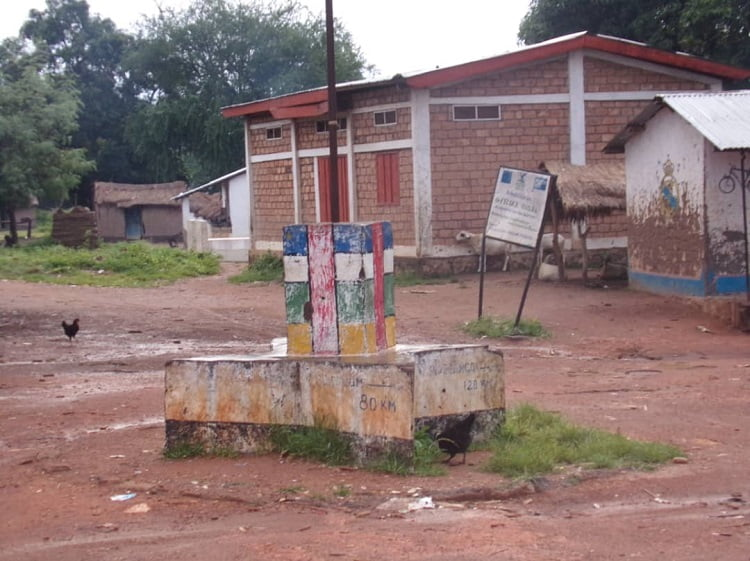
- Bavara in 2020

- Location in Central African Republic
- Coordinates: 6°46′39″N 16°35′59″E
- Country: Central African Republic
- Prefecture: Lim-Pendé
- Sub-prefecture: Paoua
- Commune: Bimbi

Bavara is a village located in the Central African Republic prefecture of Lim-Pendé. Artisanal gold mining is active in the area.

== History ==
As of late 2008, Bavara was under control of People's Army for the Restoration of Democracy (APRD).

On 17 September 2020, the Return, Reclamation, Rehabilitation rebel group took control of Bavara. They withdrew a day later, but returned on 19 September. On 2 October, rebels began forcing inhabitants to leave their homes. On 13 October 2020, it was reported that gold deposit was discovered there which prompted more rebels to arrive. As of 7 March 2021, Bavara remains under rebel control.
