= Bedam, Central African Republic =

Bedam
- Location in Central African Republic
- Coordinates: 7°41′48″N 16°30′57″E
- Country: Central African Republic
- Prefecture: Lim-Pendé
- Sub-prefecture: Paoua
- Commune: Mia-Pendé

Bedam is a village situated in Lim-Pendé Prefecture, Central African Republic.

== History ==
In response to the 1984 Markounda attack, FACA burned Bedam on 4 April 1985 as a punishment for the residents' support for Ange-Félix Patassé, François Bozizé, and Alphonse Mbaikoua.

In 2014, a Chadian armed group raided Bedam. In 2017, Bedam was the base of both RJ and its splinter group. RJ had 12 checkpoints within and around Bedam.

The ex-Séléka militia attacked Bedam twice on 29 December 2017 and on 4 January 2018, respectively. They killed civilians and a village pastor and burned houses. The residents fled and returned to the village in August 2018.

== Economy ==
There is a market in Bedam.

== Education ==
The village has one school.

== Healthcare ==
Bedam has one health post.

== Bibliography ==
- Wouloungu, Julie Roselyne Betabelet (2018). Ressources, territoires et conflits : élevage bovin et exploitation minière dans l’Ouest centrafricain (Doctoral thesis). Paris 1 Panthéon-Sorbonne University.
