= Pougol =

- Location in Central African Republic
- Coordinates: 7°16′25″N 16°10′11″E
- Country: Central African Republic
- Prefecture: Lim-Pendé
- Sub-prefecture: Paoua
- Commune: Paoua

Population (2020)
  - Total: 6,263

Pougol is a town situated in Lim-Pendé, Central African Republic. Until 2020, the town was part of Ouham-Pendé.

== History ==
RJ captured Pougol from ex-Seleka in June 2014. In September 2014, Anti-balaka seized Pougol from RJ. In an act of revenge against Anti Balaka's seizure of the town, RJ torched 26 houses belonging to the relatives of ex-APRD members who refused to join RJ. This battle caused the residents to flee to the bush on 13 September 2014.

MPC ambushed two MINUSCA patrol vehicles in Pougol on 23 August 2018. 3R and former Seleka militias attacked a vehicle owned by NGO in June 2019. They robbed the passenger's belongings and stole the vehicle.

On 8 June 2020, 3R attacked the FACA-MINUSCA checkpoint in Pougol. As a result, residents fled to the bush, Paoua, and nearby villages.

CPC rebels burned a bridge located 7 km from Pougol that provides access to the village on 10 March 2021. As a result, Pougol was isolated.

MINUSCA constructed the Poungol town hall, and it was inaugurated on 4 July 2022.

The clash between Peuhl herders and the villagers over natural resources ensued in Pougol in April 2024, prompting the residents to flee the village.

== Economy ==
Agriculture is the main economic sector for the resident's livelihood. A small number of people were also engaged in small-scale business enterprises.

== Education ==
There is one school in Pougol.

== Healthcare ==
Pougol has one health post in which the medical supplies were provided by MSF.

== Bibliography ==
- ACF, ACF (22 June 2020). RCA : Evaluation Multisectorielle à Pougol et Koundjili (Préfecture de l'Ouham-Pende (ACF/22.06.2020) (PDF) (Report).
