= Mohamed Mahdi Marboua =

Central African military officer and politician

Colonel Mohamed Mahdi Marboua

Minister of Tourism Development and Handicrafts
- In office 31 January 2006 – 2 September 2006
- President: François Bozizé
- Prime Minister: Élie Doté
- Preceded by: Anne-Marie Ngouyombo
- Succeeded by: Yvonne Mboissona
Ministerial offices
Minister Delegate for Planning, Economy and Finance
In office 2 September 2004 – 19 June 2005
President	François Bozizé
Prime Minister	Célestin Gaombalet
Preceded by	Daniel N'Ditiféï Boysémbé
Minister Delegate for Finance and Budget
In office 12 December 2003 – 2 September 2004
President	François Bozizé
Prime Minister	Célestin Gaombalet
Preceded by	Daniel N'ditiféi Boysémbé
Minister of the Government’s Secretariat and Relations with the Parliament
In office 20 March 1991 – ?
President	André Kolingba
Minister of Trade and Industry
In office 3 December 1987 – ?
President	André Kolingba
Minister of Economy and Finances
In office 1 September 1981 – 4 March 1982
President	André Kolingba
Preceded by	Barthélémy Kanda
Succeeded by	Alphonse Kongolo-Mbomy

Personal details
- Born: 25 August 1944 Bémal, Ubangi-Shari (now Central African Republic)
- Died: 25 April 2020 (aged 75) Bordeaux, France
- Education: University of Montpellier 1 University of Paris II

Military service
- Allegiance: Central African Republic
- Branch/service: Central African Republic Air Force
- Years of service: 1968-?
- Rank: Colonel

Colonel Mohamed Mahdi Marboua (25 August 1944 - 25 April 2020) was a Central African military officer and politician.

== Life ==
A Kaba native, Timothée Marboua was born in Bémal on 25 August 1944. He entered the Central African Republic Air Force in 1968. He was promoted to sergeant, officer cadet on 3 January 1969, quartermaster in 1981, and colonel. He also graduated from the University of Montpellier 1 and the University of Paris II.

On 1 September 1981, André Kolingba appointed Marboua as minister of economy and finances. However, Marboua and Kolibga's relationship deteriorated at the end of 1981 due to Marboua's closeness to Patasse. Several days before the coup attempt, on 17 February 1982, there was a plan to arrest Marboua for his pro-Patasse stance. He then was dismissed from the ministerial post on 4 March 1982 and moved to France. Returning from France, he then served as the deputy minister of budget from 8 December 1986 until 3 December 1987. Subsequently, he became the minister of trade and industry on 3 December 1987 and served it for almost four years. Afterward, he was assigned as the minister of the government's secretariat and relations with the parliament on 20 March 1991.

During Bozize's administration, he worked as Minister of Delegate for Finance and Budget (12 December 2003 - 2 September 2004), Minister Delegate for Planning, Economy, and Finance (2 September 2004 - 19 June 2005), and Minister of Tourism Development and Handicrafts (31 January 2006 - 2 September 2006). After resigning from the tourism ministry, he became the general state inspector.

Marboua died in Talence, Bordeaux, France on 25 April 2020.

=== Religion ===
Marboua converted to Islam in unknown year and replaced his name to Mohamed Mahdi Marboua. He also went hajj and became the member of Central African Islamic Community (CICA) where he was elected as the organization's president in 1998.

== Bibliography ==
- Bradshaw, Richard; Rius, Juan Fandos (2016). Historical Dictionary of the Central African Republic (Historical Dictionaries of Africa). Lanham: Rowman & Littlefield.
