= Military ranks of Central African Republic =

The Military ranks of Central African Republic are the military insignia used by the Central African Armed Forces. Being a Landlocked country, the Central African Republic does not have a navy. Being a former colony of France, Central African Republic shares a rank structure similar to that of France.

== Commissioned officer ranks ==
The rank insignia of commissioned officers.

Rank group	General / flag officers				Senior officers			Junior officers
(Central African Republic) Central African Ground Forces
(Central African Republic) Central African Ground Forces	Général d'armée	Général de corps d'armée	Général de division	Général de brigade	Colonel	Lieutenant-colonel	Commandant	Capitaine	Lieutenant	Sous-Lieutenant
Central African Air Force
Central African Air Force			Général de division	Général de brigade	Colonel	Lieutenant-colonel	Commandant	Capitaine	Lieutenant	Sous-lieutenant
Rank group	General / flag officers				Senior officers			Junior officers

== Other ranks ==
The rank insignia of non-commissioned officers and enlisted personnel.

Rank group	Senior NCOs					Junior NCOs		Enlisted
(Central African Republic) Central African Ground Forces									No insignia
(Central African Republic) Central African Ground Forces	Adjudant-chef	Adjudant	Sergent-major	Sergent-chef	Sergent	Caporal-chef	Caporal	Soldat première	Soldat
Central African Air Force									No insignia
Central African Air Force	Adjudant-chef	Adjudant	Sergent-major	Sergent-chef	Sergent	Caporal-chef	Caporal	Soldat première	Soldat
Rank group	Senior NCOs					Junior NCOs		Enlisted
