= Koundjili =

- Location in Central African Republic
- Coordinates: 7°13′24″N 16°7′18″E
- Country: Central African Republic
- Prefecture: Lim-Pendé
- Sub-prefecture: Paoua
- Commune: Paoua

Population (2020)
  - Total: 3,840

Koundjili is a village in Lim-Pendé prefecture, Central African Republic. It is one of the three villages where the 2019 Ouham Pende Massacre occurred.

== History ==
In response to the killing of a Fulani trader in Koundjili, 3R rebels attacked Koundjili on 21 May 2019 for revenge. They killed 13 villagers and looted a shop. On 27 May 2020, 3R militias returned to Koundjili and occupied it. As a result, the villagers took refuge in the bush and some went to Paoua.

== Economy ==
The villagers heavily rely on the agriculture sector as their main source of income.

== Education ==
Koundjili has one school.

== Bibliography ==
- ACF, ACF (22 June 2020). RCA : Evaluation Multisectorielle à Pougol et Koundjili (Préfecture de l'Ouham-Pende (ACF/22.06.2020) (PDF) (Report).
