= Military Coalition for the Salvation of the People and Recovery =

Armed group in the Central African Republic

- Coalition militaire pour le salut du peuple et le redressement
- Leader: Armel Sayo
- Dates active: 25 May 2024–present
- Active regions: Northwest part of Central African Republic

Military Coalition for the Salvation of the People and Recovery (CMSPR, French: Coalition militaire pour le salut du peuple et le redressement) is a rebel group present in northwestern parts of the Central African Republic.

== History ==
Areas under CMSPR control in September 2025

CMSPR was formed on May 25, 2024 by Armel Sayo to oppose the government of Faustin-Archange Touadéra. Other notable CMSPR members include a former Anti-balaka leader Florent Kema and a former high-ranking CPC militant Gali Tago. On 24, November 2024 CMSPR forces clashed with FACA and Russian forces in the village of Contair located 30 km from Kouki. On 3 February, 2025 CMSPR carried out an attack on a FACA outpost in the village of Bodjomo killing 10 FACA soldiers. Groups political coordinator Gali Tago stated that the attack came after the arrest of the groups leader Armel Sayo in Cameroon. On 26 of February, FACA and Russian forces carried out an operation against CMSPR leading to the death of three FACA soldiers and six civilians.
