= Haroun Gaye =

Central African warlord

FPRC general
- Incumbent
- Assumed office 2 November 2014

Personal details
- Born: 30 January 1968 or 1969

Haroun Gaye is a Central African warlord, general in the Popular Front for the Rebirth of Central African Republic (FPRC), sanctioned by international institutions.

== Life ==
He was born on 30 January 1968 or 1969. When the war started he was a Muslim diamond trader in PK5 district in Bangui. Since early 2014 he has been one of leaders of armed groups operating in the PK5 district in Bangui. On 2 November 2014 he was nominated as rapporteur of the FPRC coordination structure by Noureddine Adam. He commanded around 60 men e Jamaïque sector of the PK5 neighborhood in Bangui.

On 11 May 2015, Gaye and 300 demonstrators blocked ways to the National Transitional Council to disrupt the final day of the Bangui Forum. On 26 June 2015 he disrupted opening of a voter registration drive in PK5 district causing it to close. On 2 August 2015 MINUSCA tried to arrest him. His soldiers managed to repel attacks of international forces for seven hours using firearms, rocket launchers and grenades allowing him to escape. One peacekeeper was killed and eight were injured as a result. He was one of the main perpetrators of the violence which erupted in Bangui in late September 2015, working together with members of Anti-balaka. On 1 October a meeting took place in the PK5 neighborhood between Gaye and Eugene Ngaïkosset, an Anti-balaka general, with the aim of planning a joint attack on Bangui on 3 October. His group prevent Muslims from leaving PK5 district. On 26 October 2015, Gaye and his fighters interrupted a meeting between the Imam of the Central Mosque of Bangui and the Archbishop of Bangui threatening the delegation which had to withdraw from the Central Mosque and flee the PK5 district. On 17 December 2015 he was placed under the U.N. sanction list.

On 12 August 2016 he decided to escape PK5 district. Together with Abdoulaye Hissène and Hamit Tidjani they painted seven vehicles white in order to resemble UN vehicles. 35 heavily armed ex-Seleka fighter left in total. While passing through PK12 checkpoint soldier fired at them killing on fighter. In Damara they again clashed with soldiers. One fighter who fell off vehicle was killed by Anti-balaka. In Sibut MINUSCA stopped them. They abandoned their vehicles. MINUSCA arrested 11 fighters, but Gaye and Hissène managed to escape on foot. In early September 2016 he arrived N'Délé together with Hissène. From there the group supposedly travelled to Sikkikede in Vakaga prefecture where they met with Noureddine Adam, before going to Bria to attend ex-Séléka General Assembly. After the escape he has been based in Tissi overseeing trafficking of weapons from Sudan. On 11 January 2017 he threatened to kill Burundian military observer and ordered his men to surround MINUSCA patrol forcing them to withdraw.

In March 2018 he left N'Délé to meet with AU's Panel of Facilitators on 27 March 2018. In June 2018 he was reportedly heading the FPRC's Financial Management Committees in the Vakaga prefecture. In October 2018 he was arrested in Chad and detained in Sarh while trying to recruit people to FPRC from refugee camps. He returned to the Central African Republic in March 2019. In December 2020 he joined Coalition of Patriots for Change (CPC) led by former president François Bozizé. He organized multiple weapons transfers to rebels, including in mid-December and on 13 January 2021. He conflicted with FPRC general Hissene who opposed creation of CPC and on at least one occasion blocked transfer of weapons organized by Gaye. In mid-April 2021 Gaye travelled to Nyala in Sudan. In June 2022 it was reported that illness forced him to remain in Khartoum in Sudan. In July 2022 he crossed Sudanese border into Chad and was questioned by security forces in the Mangueigne sub-prefecture. He then crossed the border to join CPC forces in the Central African Republic where he was seen addressing FACA hostages in Sikikédé on 15 February 2023.
