= Létélé =

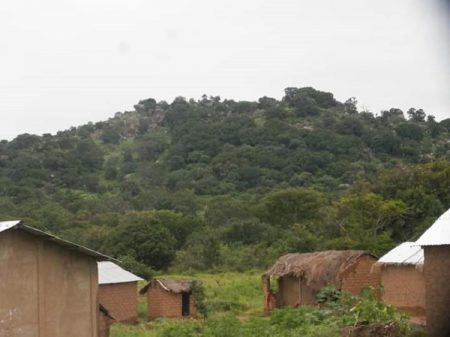
- Létélé in 2020

- Location in Central African Republic
- Coordinates: 7°8′10″N 15°42′20″E
- Country: Central African Republic
- Prefecture: Lim-Pendé
- Sub-prefecture: Ngaoundaye
- Commune: Dilouki

Létélé is a village located in Lim-Pendé Prefecture, Central African Republic.

== History ==
In 2019, 3R controlled Létélé and used it as a base to launch attacks on several places in Ouham-Pende.

On 27 August 2021, Wagner forces visited Létélé searching for ammunition and rebels. However, they looted shops along the road and arrested three shop owners. Locals believed that Wagner's visit motive was to revenge the death of its four members killed by 3R rebels. 3R stormed FACA position in Létélé on 6 November 2021.

CPC rebels attacked the FACA post in Létélé on 2 January 2022. Two soldiers were killed and two were missing. As a result, FACA withdrew to Bocaranga.

CPC stormed FACA position in Létélé on 30 November 2023, causing the residents to flee to the bush and neighboring villages.

== Economy ==
Létélé has one weekly market.

== Education ==
There is one school in the village.

== Healthcare ==
Létélé has one health post.
