= Issa Issaka Aubin =

- Born: 1969 - 1970
- Died: 27 March 2020 (aged 49 - 50); Ndiffa, Central African Republic
- Allegiance: Union of Democratic Forces for Unity (2006 - ?); Séléka (2012 - 2014); Popular Front for the Rebirth of Central African Republic (?- 2019); Party of the Rally of the Central African Nation (2019 - 2020)
- Battles / wars: Central African Republic Bush War; Central African Republic Civil War: Battle of Bangui (2013)

Issa Issaka Aubin, also known as General Aubin (1969 or 1970 - 27 March 2020), was a Central African warlord and the founder of PRNC.

== Life ==
=== 2006 - 2013 ===
Aubin, who belongs to the Gula, was born in 1969 or 1970. He joined the UFDR rebel group in 2006 due to the government's neglect of his origin, Vakaga and was appointed as the UFDR chief of staff.

Aubin later joined Séléka and was assigned as the group's chief of staff. He led the Seleka's attack in Ndélé in December 2012. On 22 March 2013, he commanded the 1000 Seleka rebels from Damara and Sibut to participate in Battle of Bangui. Aubin was reportedly wounded during a clash with South African forces. On 20 August 2013, he arrested ten looters wearing military uniforms who stole mattresses, televisions, suitcases, and medicines. Djotodia appointed Aubin as the Director of Presidential Security on 9 September 2013.

=== 2014 - 2019 ===
In 2014, he was part of the coordinator of the Crisis Military Committee of the former Seleka coalition. In April 2014, he released a press release supporting MISCA's DDR process throughout the country and calling the Central Africans to solve their issues for the country's development. In the same month, he signed the agreement with the government on behalf of ex-Seleka that allowed the authorities to transfer former Seleka's members to encampments in Sibut before returning to their origins. However, it sparked controversies among the ex-Seleka. They rejected the agreement signing since they did not get involved in the discussion.

In the unknown year, Aubin joined RPRC and became one of the group's military leaders. He commanded the PRNC's attack at the Anti-balaka base in Bria, which eliminated its commander, Theophile Ndoumba, on 25 September 2018. However, he was disgruntled by the RPRC leader, Djono Ahaba, who signed the peace agreement. Apart from that, he was one of the signatories of the Gula-Peuhl Peace Agreement in Bria as a Gula representative on 3 May 2018.

=== 2019 - 2020 ===
Due to the tension with Ahaba, Aubin founded PRNC on 28 May 2019 in Tiringoulou and designated Nourd Gregaza as the group's leader. He became the PRNC's spokesperson and chief of staff. Aubin and MLCJ's chief of staff, Ali Abderahmane, prepared and commanded the attack in Birao, Tissi, and Am Dafok. He sent his forces from Tiringoulou to partake in the attack. Apart from that, he also attempted to forge alliances with Noureddine Adam and Mahamat Al-Khatim. However, Adam and Al-Khatim rejected it.

He was killed in Ndiffa on 27 March 2020 during a clash between PRNC-RPRC and the Misseriya Arab militia. His death deteriorated Gula and Misseriya Arab relations.

== Bibliography ==
- UN Security Council (6 December 2019). Letter dated 6 December 2019 from the Panel of Experts on the Central African Republic extended pursuant to resolution 2454 (2019) addressed to the President of the Security Council (Report).
