= Kellé Clair =

- Location in Central African Republic
- Coordinates: 7°4′53″N 15°33′23″E
- Country: Central African Republic
- Prefecture: Lim-Pendé
- Sub-prefecture: Kodi
- Commune: Kodi

Kellé Clair, also written Keleclaire or Kelle Claire or Kélé-Claire, is a village located in Lim-Pendé Prefecture, Central African Republic.

== History ==
In October 2007, an armed group attacked Kellé Clair. Although the local gendarmeries managed to repel the attack, there were casualties in which three people were killed and four injured.

The villagers fled Kellé Clair following the rumor of 3R's attack in Bocaranga on 1 September 2017.

== Economy ==
There is a weekly market in the village.

== Education ==
Kellé Clair has one school.

== Healthcare ==
The village has one health post. It serves not only Kellé Clair, but also the nearby settlements such as Borodou, Kellé 2, Bezere.
