= Kowone =

- Location in Central African Republic
- Coordinates: 7°18′5″N 15°55′4″E
- Country: Central African Republic
- Prefecture: Lim-Pendé
- Sub-prefecture: Ngaoundaye
- Commune: Yémé

Kowone is a village located in Lim-Pendé Prefecture, Central African Republic.

== History ==
As of 2021, Kowone was controlled by 3R rebels. 3R group established a base in Kowone. On 3 October 2021, a mine explosion took place in Kowone and caused five casualties.

On 16 January 2023, 3R rebels attacked Kowone. They looted shops and abducted two people; one of them was a merchant. Three days later, 3R released the merchant after he paid the ransom of 11 million CFA francs.

== Education ==
There is one school in the village.

== Healthcare ==
Kowone has one health post.
