= Bang, Central African Republic =

Bang
- Location in Central African Republic
- Coordinates: 7°28′40″N 15°32′18″E
- Country: Central African Republic
- Prefecture: Lim-Pendé
- Sub-prefecture: Ngaoundaye
- Commune: Lim

Bang is a village located near the Cameroon–Central African Republic border in Lim-Pendé Prefecture, Central African Republic. The village holds economic importance for the government since it generates customs revenue.

== History ==
RJ captured Bang from Séléka on 10 February 2014. At the end of February, a fire incident occurred in Bang. It razed 520 houses, leading the villagers to flee the village. They only returned to Bang in March 2014. Bang was liberated by MISCA on 1 July 2014. Together with Ngaoundaye, RJ rebels encircled Bang on 15 June 2016.

RJ attacked Bang on 4 April 2017. Bang fell to RJ's hand on 10 July 2017. This incident led the Cameroon authorities to close the border, causing the locals to be unable to go to the market in Mbaiboum. MINUSCA liberated the village on 10 October 2017. Three days later, around 1500 villagers returned to Bang.

Fifty 3R attacked Bang on 28 December 2018 and managed to capture the village. 3R rebels occupied Bang on 22 July 2020. 3R rebels attacked the village on 14-15 April 2025. The government forces were able to repulse the attack.

== Education ==
The village has one school.

== Healthcare ==
There is one health post in Bang.
