= Taley =

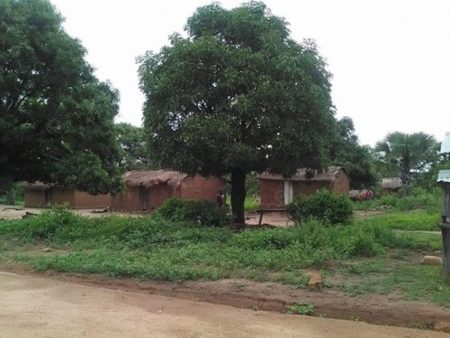
- Taley in 2020

- Location in Central African Republic
- Coordinates: 6°40′24″N 16°22′4″E
- Country: Central African Republic
- Prefecture: Lim-Pendé
- Sub-prefecture: Taley
- Commune: Taley

Government
  - Sub-Prefect: Samuel Ndofara

Population (2020)
  - Total: 6,862

Taley (also known as Talé), is a village situated in Lim-Pendé, Central African Republic.

== History ==
APRD attacked a Peuhl camp in Taley on 18 February 2010 and killed 18 people, including 4 children.

Responding to the killings in Koundjili and Lemouna in 2019, the villagers formed a self-defense group to guard Taley from 3R rebels incursion.

3R rebels entered Taley on 27 September 2020 and kidnapped the local gendarmes. They also looted civilian properties. As a result, the residents fled to the bush. As of 12 October 2020, most residents had returned to the village.

A rebel group occupied Taley on 12 July 2021. They burned motorbikes and extorted money from traders.

== Demographics ==
Karé people make up the majority of the village demography. Most of the villagers are Christians.

== Education ==
There are three schools in Taley.

== Healthcare ==
Taley has one health center and a health post. The health post is run by the catholic church.

== Bibliography ==
- RRM RCA (2020). RCA : Evaluation Multisectorielle à Taley (Préfecture de l'Ouham Pendé) (ACF/15.10.2020) (PDF) (Report).
