= Eugene Ngaïkosset =

Central African militant

Eugene Barret Ngaïkosset
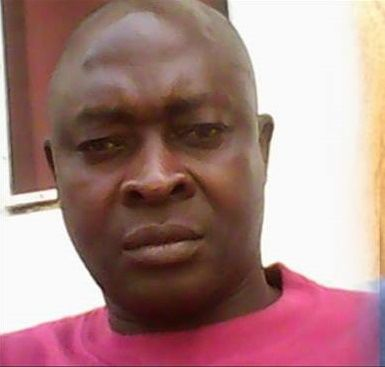

Captain of Presidential Guard
- In office 2005–2013

Leader of Anti-balaka
- In office 2015–2021

Personal details
- Born: 8 October 1967 (age 59) Bossangoa

Eugene Barret Ngaïkosset is a former member of the Central African Armed Forces and leader of Anti-balaka, arrested in 2021 for his war crimes.

== Life ==
He was born on 8 October 1967 in Bossangoa. Formerly a homeless child, he was trained at Karako military camp in Bangui. From 1996 to 1998 he was a captain of Karako militia. After being integrated into armed forces by his uncle François Bozizé he fled to Chad 28 May 2001 with him following failed coup attempt against president Patasse. After Bozize's coup in 2003 he became a FACA officer.

=== Civil war (2005–2009) ===
In 2005, Ngaïkosset, who was lieutenant at that time, was a head of unit of presidential guard based in Bossangoa. He has committed multiple attacks on civilians loyal to Popular Army for the Restoration of the Republic and Democracy. In February 2006 his unit killed 30 villagers in Bemal area by randomly firing at them. On 22 March 2006 units led by him beheaded a teacher in the village of Bemal. In February 2007 Human Rights Watch documented 51 killing attributed to him. He was nicknamed "butcher of Paoua".

=== Civil war (2012–present) ===
When Seleka rebel entered Bangui on 24 March 2013 he fled to the Democratic Republic of the Congo. In November he moved to Cameroon where he was arrested on 1 December 2013. In April 2014 arrest warrant was issued against him for his war crimes. On 12 May 2015 he was released and deported to the Central African Republic. After getting off plane he was placed in research and investigation section (SRI) headquarters where he disappeared in unknown circumstances on 17 May 2015. He created his own group of Anti-balaka, consisting of former FACA members. He was one of the main perpetrators of the violence which erupted in Bangui in late September 2015, working together with members of ex-Seleka. On the night of 27-28 September 2015, Ngaïkosset and others made an unsuccessful attempt to attack the “Izamo” gendarmerie camp and steal weapons and ammunition. On 28 September, the group surrounded the offices of national radio of C.A.R. On 1 October a meeting took place in the PK5 neighborhood between Ngaïkosset and Haroun Gaye, a leader of the Popular Front for the Rebirth of the Central African Republic (FPRC), with the aim of planning a joint attack on Bangui on 3 October. On 8 October the C.A.R. Justice Minister announced plans to investigate him and other individuals for their roles in the attacks. In December 2015 he was sanctioned by the UN and US Department of the Treasury’s Office of Foreign Assets Control.

On 4 September 2021 he was arrested at PK22 in Bangui and transferred to the headquarters of the research and investigation section. On 10 September he was formally accused by a judge of crimes against humanity.
