= Siege of PK5 district =

Battle in Bangui, Central African Republic

- Part of Central African Republic Civil War (2012-present)
- Map of armed groups in PK5 district in July 2018
Date	5 December 2013 – 4 January 2020 (6 years, 4 weeks and 2 days)
Location	PK5 district, Bangui 4.375°N 18.538°E
Result	Government victory

Belligerents
Muslim self-defense groups ex-Séléka (2013–6) "Tola" (armed merchants)	Central African Republic: FACA; Police; Gendarmerie; (United Nations) MINUSCA	Anti-balaka

Commanders and leaders
Niméri Matar “Force” (DOW); Abdoul Danda †; Mohamed Tahir "Apo" †; Haroun Gaye (escaped); Abdoulaye Hissène (escaped) Djibril Youssouf	(Central African Republic) Alexandre-Ferdinand Nguendet (Central African Republic) Catherine Samba-Panza (Central African Republic) Faustin-Archange Touadéra (Central African Republic) Mombéka Marcel †	Patrice-Edouard Ngaissona (surrendered)

Strength
185+ militants(2018); 400+ militants (2020) 200+ armed civilians (2020)	(Central African Republic) 2,390 police and gendarmerie (2019)	Unknown

Casualties and losses
28+ killed	(United Nations) 2+ killed	Unknown
- 107,000 civilians displaced

From 2013 to 2020, around 15,000 Muslims were besieged in PK5 district in Bangui, Central African Republic.

== Background ==
Before March 2013 about 122,000 Muslims lived in Bangui. On 24 March 2013, the Muslim Séléka coalition captured Bangui.

== Timeline ==
On 5 December 2013, the Christian Anti-balaka attacked Bangui. More than 50 bodies were brought to a mosque in PK5 district. In December 2013, self-defense groups emerged in the PK5 neighborhood as a response to Anti-balaka attacks.

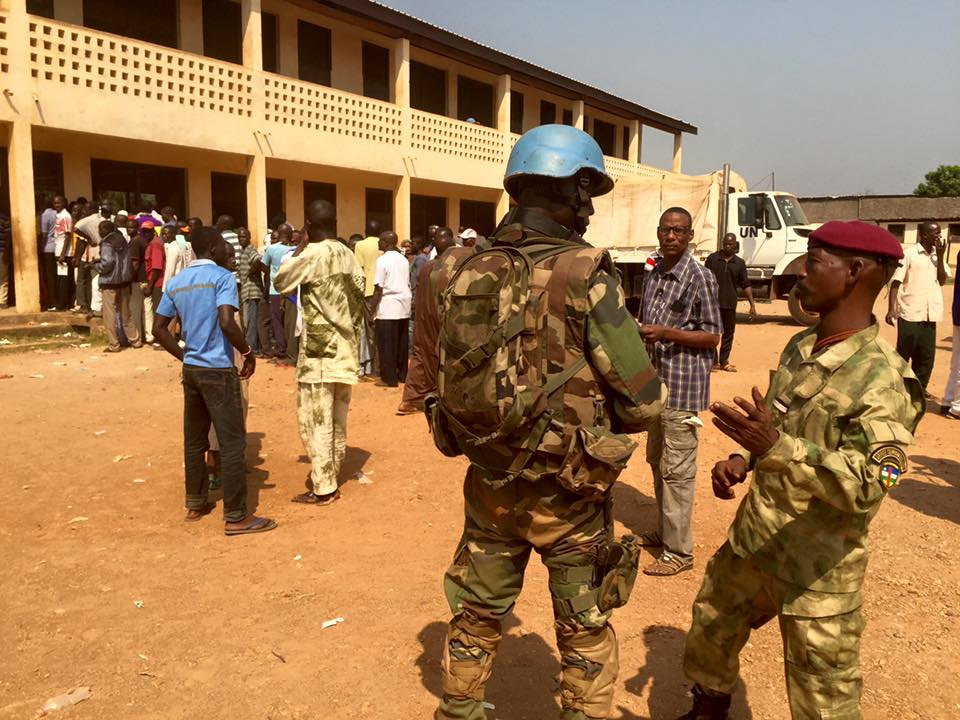
MINUSCA soldiers in PK5 district, December 2015

On 26 June 2015, one of the leaders of PK5 self-defense groups, Haroun Gaye, forced a voter registration drive in PK5 to close. On 2 August 2015, MINUSCA, the United Nations peacekeeping force, tried to arrest him. Gaye's soldiers managed to repel the attacks of the international forces for seven hours using firearms, rocket launchers, and grenades, allowing him to escape. One peacekeeper was killed and eight were injured in the fighting. On 25 September, in response to the murder of a Muslim driver, PK5 self-defense groups attacked Christian neighborhoods north of the enclave. Anti-balaka responded by erecting barricades, preventing UN soldiers from accessing areas plagued by violence. On 15 October, three people were killed and a dozen injured in clashes between Anti-balaka and self-defense groups after Anti-balaka fired at a group of Muslim boys playing soccer. Between 26 September and 13 November, further clashes killed at least 100 people, displaced 35,000, and destroyed more than 1,075 buildings.

On 30 November 2015, Pope Francis visited PK5 district, calling for an end to hostilities. On 2 February 2016, after two years of school closures due to the poor security situation, it was reported that schools in PK5 would reopen and resume teaching the standard curriculum. On 11 February, self-defense groups from PK5 and Boeing signed a non-aggression pact.

On 19 June 2016, members of the "50/50" self-defense force abducted six policemen, demanding the release of their fellow fighters who had been arrested by security forces. On 20 June, clashes erupted between MINUSCA and militiamen resulting in seven deaths (three civilians and four militiamen) and one peacekeeper being injured. On 12 August, 35 ex-Séléka fighters, including Abdoulaye Hissène and Haroun Gaye, withdrew from PK5. On 4 October, the CAR police commander, Mombéka Marcel, was assassinated by PK5 self-defense groups. On 30 October, heavy clashes erupted between the "Force" and "50/50" self-defense groups, resulting in 10 deaths including Abdoul Danda and Issa Kappi.

On 7 February 2017, while security forces were trying to arrest militia leader Youssouf Malinga (aka "Big Man"), fire was exchanged between groups, resulting in two civilians and two militiamen (including Youssouf himself) being killed. In response, rebels murdered local pastor Jean-Paul Sankagui.

On 17 January 2018, clashes erupted between the "Force" self-defense group and the "Tola" group of armed traders after merchants refused to pay taxes to the militiamen. 47 shops were damaged as a result.

=== Failed disarmament operation ===
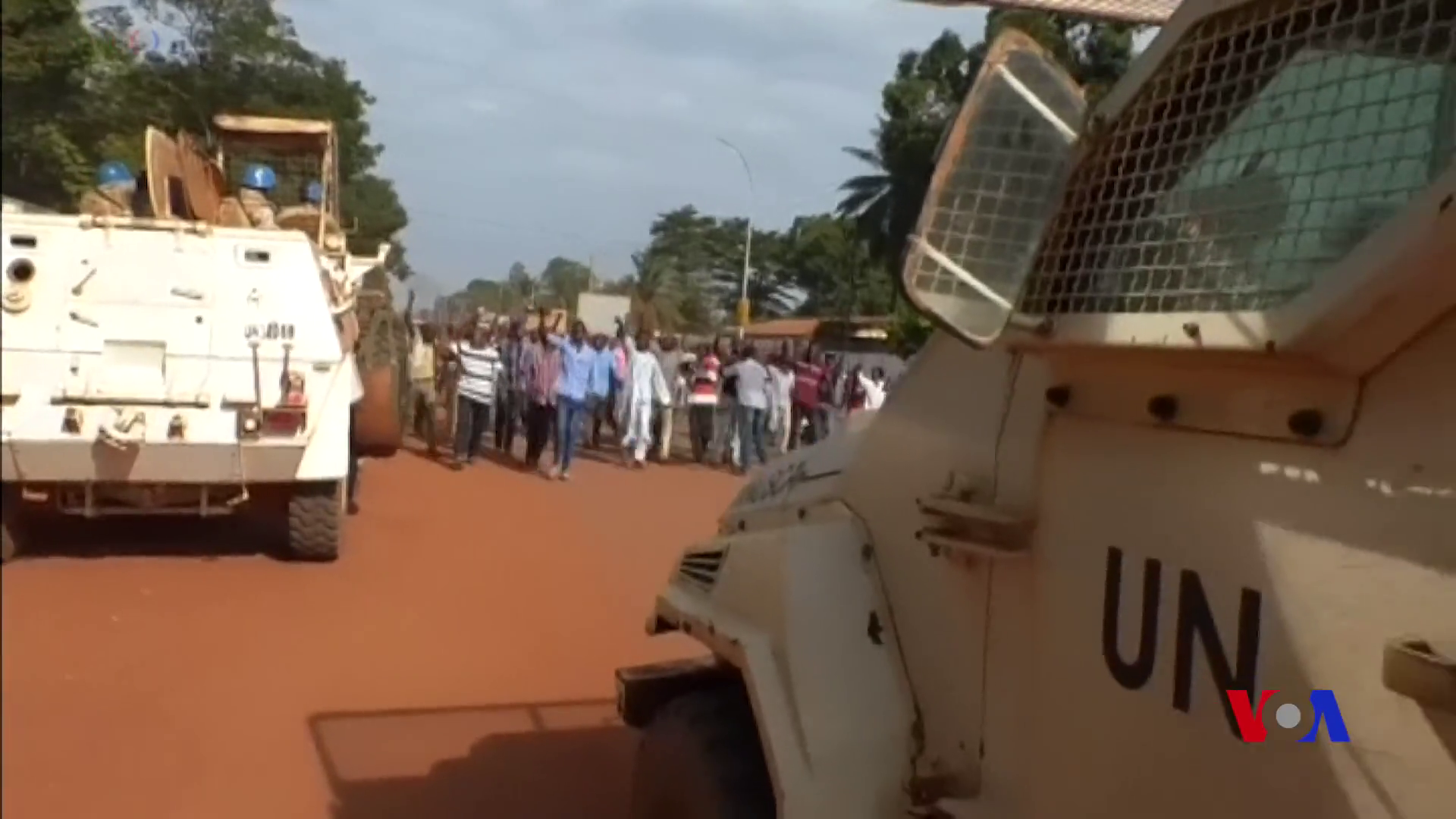
Protests against MINUSCA after the failed Operation Sukula

In the night between 7 and 8 April 2018, MINUSCA and FACA (CAR armed forces) launched "Operation Sukula" to disarm PK5 self-defense groups. Two militiamen were killed, 45 civilians and militiamen were injured, and 12 peacekeepers were wounded. A local police station was burned down by militia members following the departure of security forces. On 10 April, Rwandan peacekeepers engaged in a gun battle with a crowd of angry people, some of which were armed, who were protesting the abduction of a Fulani woman on the outskirts of PK5 district. 30 people were killed and 100 injured by Rwandan forces, while one Rwandan peacekeeper was killed and eight injured. Security forces withdrew from the area as a result. On 11 January, demonstrations against MINUSCA were held, during which bodies of 17 people killed during clashes were displayed.

On 1 May 2018, PK5 self-defense forces led by Amineri Matar (aka “Force”) stormed the Church of Fatima, killing 27 people and wounding 170. On 6 May, Anti-balaka supported by security forces attacked PK5 district, but their attack was repelled. On 20 May, it was reported that taxis will resume operation in PK5. On 2 October, six people were killed (including three civilians and three militiamen) and 10 injured as a result of shootout between the "Force" and "Moussa Danda" militia groups. On 15 October, a pregnant woman was murdered by members of "Apo" group. On 24 October, two militiamen from "50/50" were injured following a shootout.

On 1 June 2019, Niméri Matar, the leader of the PK5 self-defense groups, died of sickness. On 10 July, heavy clashes erupted between members of militias, resulting in four people being killed and 26 injured. On 29 November, two militiamen were killed as a result of clashes between fighters loyal to "LT" and "Kamba-ti-Wa". FACA soldiers were deployed in surrounding neighborhoods to secure fleeing people.

=== Defeat of self-defense groups and aftermath ===
On 26 December 2019, militia members tried to force traders to pay tax on the sale of Christmas toys. In response one of the militants was stabbed to death. Heavy clashes erupted between both groups, with rebels burning the stores of some merchants. At least 35 people died and 50 houses were burnt. On 31 December, the UN announced an arms free zone in PK5 neighborhood, forcing local fighters to lay down their weapons. On 4 January 2020, police returned to PK5 district for the first time in six years. On 15 January, the UN claimed to have dismantled all 13 bases of "ex-self-defense" forces. On 3 March, it was announced that regular tax collection would resume in PK5. On 13 March, SODECA, the CAR water distribution agency, announced that access to water would be restored in PK5.

On 22 October 2020, the CAR government launched a disarmament campaign in PK5 district. More than 400 militiamen and 200 civilians returned tens of automatic rifles, 104 bullets, and three shells. Around 30 ex-militiamen registered for the DDR process. On 30 October, members of "Mujahideen" self-defense group looted a local house, stealing more than 150 million CFA Francs. On 2 March 2021, two people were killed and six wounded after the military tried to arrest self-defense leader "Saddam". On 2 May, he was arrested by security forces in Ramandji, a part of Bangui. On 29 July, former PK5 militiaman "LT" was arrested after threatening police officers with a handgun.

== Self-defense groups ==
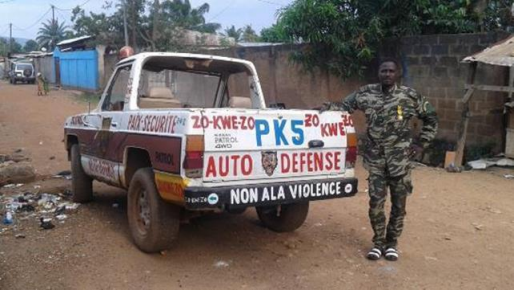
Niméri Matar, leader of PK5 groups in 2016

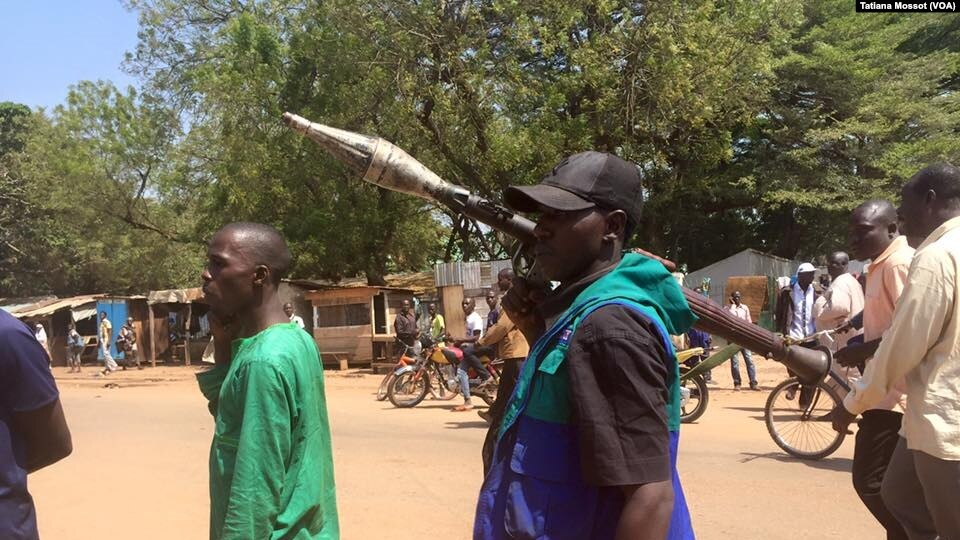
Armed militiaman in PK5 district in 2015

Group	Fighters	Leader	Headquarters
Force	~80	Niméri Matar (2015–9); Mahamat Rahamat "LT"(2019–)	?
You	?	Youssouf Ayatoulah Adjaraye	Bulata
Apo	~30	Mohamed Tahir (until 2018)	Koudoukou Crossroads
50/50	~50	Issa Kappy (until 2016); Djido	Cameroonian district
Moussa Kana	~25	Abdoul Danda (until 2016)	Yakite Bridge
