= Bémal =

- Location in Central African Republic
- Coordinates: 7°34′52″N 16°36′40″E
- Country: Central African Republic
- Prefecture: Lim-Pendé
- Sub-prefecture: Paoua
- Commune: Mia-Péndé

Bémal is a village located in Lim-Pendé Prefecture, Central African Republic. Until December 2020, Bémal was part of Ouham-Pende.

== History ==
=== Central African Republic Bush War (2004-2007) ===
In December 2005, APRD attacked Bémal.

Presidential Guard soldiers led by Lt. Eugene Ngaïkosset visited Bémal on 11 February 2006 at 1 p.m. in revenge for the APRD attack on 29 January. As they arrived at the village, the villagers fled and the PG troops shot toward them. They killed a policeman and a civil servant who worked at customs offices. In addition, Presidential Guard looted houses and hospitals. As a result, 1.800 Bémal residents fled to the bush and Chad.

Following an attack on the commercial truck near the Chad-CAR border by an unknown group on 15 March 2006, 75 Presidential Guard troops revisited Bémal on 22 March 2006 evening. On the next day morning, they beheaded a village school teacher on his way to the house from the market.

ANT raided Bémal in December 2006. They stole 32 cows, farming tools, and peanuts.

=== Central African Republic Civil War (2012-present) ===
ANT visited Bémal on 3 April 2014. They killed three people and stole three motorcycles. On 24 April 2014, an unknown armed group from Chad attacked Bémal. They killed the villagers and burned houses. Four days after the attack, ex-Séléka troops occupied Bémal.

On 2 January 2018, the ex-Séléka group led by General Ahmat Bahar occupied Bémal. This led the residents to flee to Paoua and Chad. With the presence of MINUSCA, the villagers gradually returned to Bémal in April 2018. Nevertheless, the villagers were still afraid to go to their farming field on the village outskirts fearing the presence of the armed group.

== Economy ==
There is a market in Bemal that opens on Thursday and Saturday.

== Education ==
Bemal has one school.

== Healthcare ==
A health post is available in Bemal.

== Security ==
There is one police station in Bemal.

== Notable residents ==
- Mohamed Mahdi Marboua, Central African military officer and politician.

== Bibliography ==
- ACF, ACF (22 July 2018). Evaluation Multisectorielle RRM (MSA): Rapport Préliminaire(Commune de Mia-Pendé/Sous-préfecture de Paoua /Préfecture de l’Ouham-Pendé) (PDF) (Report).
- HRW, HRW (18 April 2008). State of Anarchy: Rebellion and Abuses against Civilians (PDF) (Report). Human Rights Watch.
