= Ndiffa =

- Location in the Central African Republic
- Coordinates: 9.5805°N 21.7227°E
- Country: Central African Republic
- Prefecture: Vakaga
- Sub-prefecture: Birao
- Commune: Ouandja
- Time zone: UTC + 1

Ndiffa is a town in Vakaga Prefecture, Central African Republic.

== History ==
In 1962, Ndiffa had a population of 359 people.

On 27 March 2020 Party of the Rally of the Central African Nation (PRNC) chief of staff, Issa Issaka Aubin, was killed by Misseriya Arabs in Ndiffa village during clashes. From 23 to 26 May 2022 the village was occupied by Wagner Group mercenaries who looted shops. On 11 November three government workers were kidnapped by PRNC rebels near Ndiffa. As of late December Ndiffa remains under control of PRNC general Ali Mohamed alias B13.
