= Kouki, Central African Republic =

Kouki
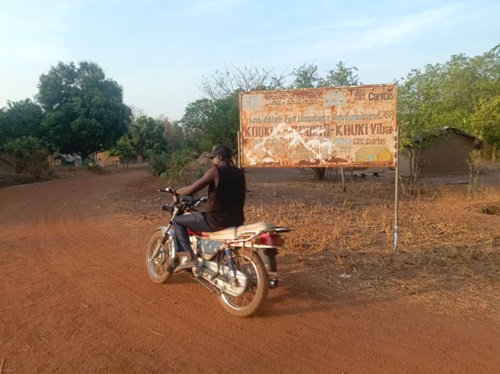
- Kouki in 2024

- Location in Central African Republic
- Coordinates: 7°10′3″N 17°18′4″E
- Country: Central African Republic
- Prefecture: Ouham
- Sub-prefecture: Nana-Bakassa
- Commune: Nana-Bakassa

Kouki is a village situated in Ouham Prefecture, Central African Republic.

== History ==
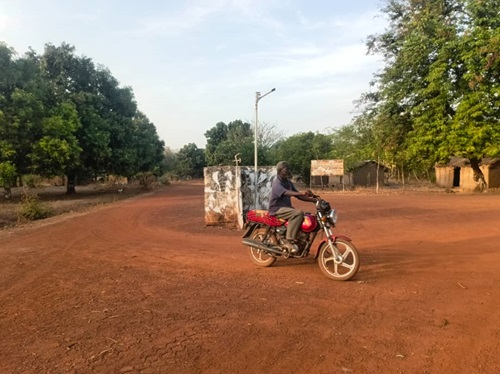
Kouki exit

From 1 January to 11 October 1911, Kouki became the capital of Ouham-Pendé District.

In 2009, ACTED rehabilitated the bridge that was damaged due to the heavy rain.

The armed group attacked Kouki on 25 April 2014. They burned houses and harassed the locals, prompting the residents to flee to the bush. The village received another attack from ex-Seleka and Peuhl militia on 9 June, causing the villagers to flee. In 2014, Ex-Seleka and armed Pehul militia launched 16 attacks in Kouki. The villagers only began to return to Kouki in February and March 2015.

An armed group attacked two MSF-owned vehicles in the village on 18 May 2016, killing one driver and stealing the passengers belongings.

Anti-balaka stole a cattle trader's motorcycle in Kouki on 30 May 2018. Afterward, they escaped and clashed with MINUSCA forces, causing them to flee to the bush and abandon their stolen motorcycle.

A massacre ensued in Kouki market on 28 April 2022, killing 17 people. Locals blamed Wagner and FACA for it. Wagner and FACA soldiers carried out a door-to-door operation in Kouki on 13 September 2022 and arrested 200 men. Wager also reportedly stole civilian belongings.

Alleged CPC rebels killed a FACA soldier in Kouki on 28 April 2023.

== Economy ==
There is a weekly market in the village. Near Kouki, there is a gold mine that attracts foreigners, mainly from Chad and Sudan, to work in it.

== Education ==
Kouki has three schools. Ex-Seleka occupied the school from November 2016 to March 2017.

== Healthcare ==
There is a health post in Kouki.

== Bibliography ==
- ACF (June 2014). RCA : Evaluation Multisectorielle RRM Rapport préliminaire (3 juin 2014) (PDF) (Report).
