= Bodjomo =

- Location in Central African Republic
- Coordinates: 7°24′56″N 17°8′1″E
- Country: Central African Republic
- Prefecture: Ouham
- Sub-prefecture: Markounda
- Commune: Nana Markounda

Bodjomo, also spelled Bojomo, is a village located in Ouham Prefecture, Central African Republic.

== History ==
One hundred APRD fighters attacked Bodjomo on 28 December 2005, making it the first APRD's attack. In response to it, Presidential Guard visited the village. They killed seven civilians and torched 500 houses.

Revolution and Justice captured Bodjomo in January 2014 from Seleka's hand. In April 2014, Séléka militias visited Bodjomo and killed four people, including two catechists from the catholic church.

On 28 December 2017, a clash between RJ and MPC ensued in Bodjomo. As a result, the villagers fled, thus leaving the ex-Seleka fighters only in Bodjomo.

In September 2022, a flood swept Bodjomo due to the heavy rain, causing the destruction of farm fields and the villager's houses.

CMSPR rebels attacked the village on 3 February 2025. They killed 5 and injured 3 FACA soldiers.

== Education ==
Bodjomo has three schools. In February 2016, only two were operational. An armed group occupied the school in September 2016, thus averting the teaching and learning activities.

== Healthcare ==
There is one health post in the village.

== Bibliography ==
- Report of the Mapping Project documenting serious violations of international human rights law and international humanitarian law committed within the territory of Central African Republic between January 2003 and December 2015 (PDF) (Report). Minusca. May 2017. p. 250.
