= Yvonne Mboissona =

Central African politician (born 1957)

Minister of Water, Forests, Hunting and Fisheries and the Environment
- In office 22 January 2008 – 19 January 2009
- President: François Bozizé
- Prime Minister: Faustin-Archange Touadéra
- Preceded by: Emmanuel Bizzo
- Succeeded by: Emmanuel Bizot (as Water, Forests, Hunting, and Fishing); François Naoueyama (as Environment and Ecology)

Minister of Tourism Development and Handicrafts
- In office 2 September 2006 – 22 January 2008
- President: François Bozizé
- Prime Minister: Élie Doté
- Preceded by: Mohamed Mahdi Marboua
- Succeeded by: Bernadette Sayo

Personal details
- Born: 18 June 1957 (age 69) Bouar, Ubangi-Shari (now the present-day Central African Republic)
- Party: Union pour un mouvement populaire de Centrafrique; Kwa Na Kwa
- Relatives: François Bozizé (brother)
- Education: Institut supérieur de finances bancaires
- Occupation: Politician

Yvonne Mboissona (born 18 June 1957), often written Yvonne Mboïssona or Yvonne M'Boïssona, is a Central African politician who served as the Minister of Tourism Development and Handicrafts (2006–2008) and Minister of Water, Forests, Hunting and Fisheries and the Environment (2008–2009) during Bozize Presidency.

== Early life and education ==
Mboissona was born in Bouar on 18 June 1957. She finished her high school at Lycée de Fatima in Bangui. Subsequently, she went to Donetsk and learned the Russian language at a preparatory school in Donetsk. Afterwards, she enrolled at Institut supérieur de finances bancaires (Higher Institute of Banking Finance) in France.

== Political career ==
During Kolingba's presidency, Bozize was put into jail for a coup attempt, and she protested it by submitting the case under the name M’Boïssona v. Central African Republic to the United Nations Human Rights Committee on 14 November 1990.

Under the Bozize administration, the International Crisis Group named Mboissona as his close aide, who played an important role in Bozize's power consolidation. Mboissona returned to CAR in 2003 and was appointed as president's delegate in charge of health issues, social affairs, youth, and sports. She held a pro-Bozize rally in Lakouanga, Bangui, on 2 November 2004. Mboissona was elected as a member of the National Assembly in 2005, representing the 3rd arrondissement of Bangui.

In 2006, Mboissona was appointed as the Minister of Tourism Development and Handicrafts for two years. In the same year, she founded a political party that addressed HIV/AIDS and poverty issues, the Union of the Popular Movement of Central Africa, on 1 June. Later, the party joined Kwa Na Kwa. Under her tenure, a tourist complex was constructed in Monkey Island, Bangui. Other than that, she privatized the Hôtel du Centre to Kruger Brent Tourism through an agreement signed on 15 December 2007, aiming to modernize and develop country's tourism sector.

Touadéra assigned her as minister of water, forestry, hunting, fisheries, and the environment on 22 January 2008, and she retained that position until January 2009. Under her tenure, she was appointed Chairman of the COMIFAC in the 5th COMIFAC Council of Ministers Session in Bangui in September 2008. Furthermore, she stipulated that reforestation policy was one of the ministry top priorities. Upon the resignation of Jean-Barkès Gombe-Ketté as Mayor of Bangui, Mboissona was rumored to become his successor.

== Personal life ==
Mboissona is the sister of François Bozizé.
