= Party of the Rally of the Central African Nation =

Armed rebel group

- Rassemblement Patriotique pour le Renouveau de la Centrafrique
- Leader: Nourd Gregaza
- Dates active: 2019–
- Split from: Patriotic Rally for the Renewal of the Central African Republic (until 2022)
- Headquarters: Tiringoulou
- Active regions: Haute-Kotto, Vakaga, Bamingui-Bangoran subprefectures
- Wars: Central African Republic Civil War (2012–present)
- Website: PRNC

Party of the Rally of the Central African Nation (French: Parti du rassemblement de la nation centrafricaine; PRNC) is an armed group in the Central African Republic based in the northern part of the country. It is a splinter group of Patriotic Rally for the Renewal of the Central African Republic.

== History ==
On 28 May 2019 former RPRC general Issa Issaka Aubin issued a communique announcing creation of PRNC and naming Nourd Gregaza as its president. PRNC participated in MLCJ offensive on Birao on 1 and 2 September 2019 as well as Tissi and Am Dafok. On 10 September around 50 PRNC fighter entered Birao, assisting in repelling FPRC attack on 14 September, led by general Mahamat Djouma. On 27 March 2020 PRNC chief of staff, Issa Issaka Aubin, was killed by Misseriya Arabs in Ndiffa during clashes. PRNC participated together with RPRNC and MLCJ in 2020 N'Délé clashes.

On 22 July 2020 PRNC rebels murdered five civilians in Bougnoul Niakania and Krakoma village in Haute-Kotto. On 14 August 2022 PRNC fighter killed 11 civilians and injured 20 in Bornou village near Bria. On 13 October 2022 Mohamed Ali alias B13 was nominated chief of staff of PRNC. On 11 November PRNC kidnapped three government workers demanding ransom and release of two their leaders from prison, Khalite Azor and Djouma Narkoyo.
