= Maïtoukoulou =

- Location in Central African Republic
- Coordinates: 7°56′0″N 17°37′40″E
- Country: Central African Republic
- Prefecture: Ouham
- Sub-prefecture: Markounda
- Commune: Nana Markounda

Maïtoukoulou, also written Maitoukoulou, is a village situated near Central African Republic–Chad border in Ouham Prefecture, Central African Republic.

== History ==
In December 2005, APRD established its headquarters in Maïtoukoulou. Measles outbreak hit the village in March 2011.

An unknown Chadian armed group occupied Maïtoukoulou on 11 June 2012. Later they left the village on unknown date. The village youth militia clashed with ex-Seleka in mid-August 2013. Ex-Seleka militias visited the village and killed nine civilians on 2 September 2013. In October 2016, FPRC and RJ controlled the village.

== Economy ==
The village has a market.

== Education ==
There is a school in the village.

== Healthcare ==
Maïtoukoulou has one health center.
