= Gaston N'Guérékata =

Central African mathematician and politician

Gaston Mandata Nguérékata
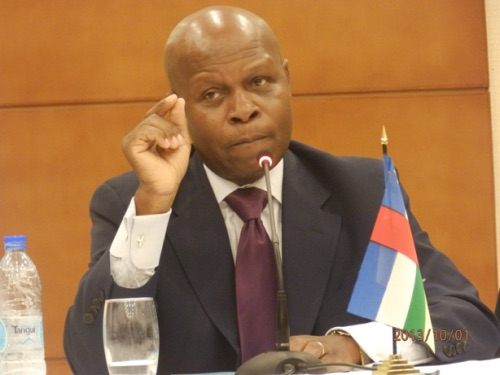
- Gaston Nguerekata in 2013

Minister Advisor Spokesperson for President André Kolingba
- In office 1992–1993
- President: Andre Kolingba
- Prime Minister: Timothée Malendoma; Enoch Derant Lakoué

Personal details
- Born: 20 May 1953 Paoua, Ubangi-Shari (now the present-day Central African Republic)
- Party: Parti Pour la Renaissance Centrafricaine (PARC)
- Education: University of Montreal
- Occupation: Mathematician; Politician

Gaston Mandata Nguérékata (born 20 May 1953) is a Central African mathematician and politician. He was the first Central African to earn a Ph.D. in mathematics.

== Early life and education ==
Nguérékata was born in Paoua on May 20, 1953. He finished his primary education in Ecole Sous Préfecturale de Paoua. As an elementary school student, he became the accountant at his father's store, and soon he discovered that he loved math. Afterward, he continued high school at Lycee Moderne de Berberati and then at Lycée des Rapides in Bangui. During his year at Lycée des Rapides Bangui, he was appointed as the school's basketball team captain. In 1972, he graduated from high school as the first-rank achiever nationalwide on Baccalaureate Series C, the high school national graduating test for mathematics concentration.

Upon completing high school, he continued his higher education from graduate to doctoral degree at the University of Montreal through a Canadian government scholarship. He obtained a Ph.D. degree in 1980 with the dissertation titled Quelques Remarques sur les Equations Differentielles Abstraites. He then attended postdoctoral education at University of California, Berkeley.

== Career ==
=== Academic career ===
In 1976, he worked as a teaching assistant at the University of Montreal until 1980. From 1978 to 1980, he became an instructor at Université du Québec à Trois-Rivières. He then returned to the Central African Republic in December 1980 and served as Vice Rector of University of Bangui from 1981 to 1983 and acting rector of the University of Bangui from 1983 to 1984. After he resigned as Andre Kolingba's spokesperson, he served as the University of Bangui's Vice Rector from 1994 to 1995. Upon resigning as vice-rector of the University of Bangui, he moved to the US and taught at Daemen University.

==== Morgan State University ====
In 1996, he joined Morgan State University as a lecturer. One year later, he was promoted to associate professor. In 2003, his rank was elevated to professor and held it until 2017 when he became the University Distinguished Professor.

=== Political career ===
Nguérékata joined RDC and served as high commissioner, then deputy minister, of science, technology, and environment from 1987 to 1992. In 1992, he became the Spokesperson for Andre Kolingba until 1993. He also participated in Earth Summit and served as spokesperson for the African Ministerial Group. He founded Parti Pour la Renaissance Centrafricaine (PARC) in 2013. In October 2013, he called for Michel Djotodia resignation due to his incompetency in leading the country.

In 2014, he launched several actions in Central African Republic such as providing free WIFI to University of Bangui and launching a project Cahier de doléances (Book of Grievances) in Mbaiki. On 27 February 2015, he signed the Catholic Church Community of Sant’Egidio Central African Republic national reconciliation agreement in Rome. He ran for at 2015–16 Central African general election as a presidential candidate of PARC. He earned 22,391 votes and did not advance to the second round. In 2022, he resigned from his post as the chairman of PARC due to personal issues.

== Personal life ==
Nguérékata speaks French and English.

== Awards ==
- , Commander Order of Central African Merit - 1991.
- , Chevalier of Legion of Honour - 1985.
- Officer of Central African Orders of Academic Palms - 1984

== Bibliography ==
=== Articles ===
- Ezzinbi, Khalil; Fatajou, Samir; N’guérékata, Gaston Mandata (15 February 2009). "Pseudo-almost-automorphic solutions to some neutral partial functional differential equations in Banach spaces". Nonlinear Analysis: Theory, Methods & Applications. 70 (4): 1641–1647.
- Ezzinbi, Khalil; Fatajou, Samir; N'Guérékata, Gaston Mandata (15 March 2009). "Pseudo almost automorphic solutions for dissipative differential equations in Banach spaces". Journal of Mathematical Analysis and Applications. 351 (2): 7650772.
- Ezzinbi, Khalil; N'Guérékata, Gaston Mandata (1 April 2007). "Almost automorphic solutions for some partial functional differential equations". Journal of Mathematical Analysis and Applications. 328 (1): 344–358.
- Baillon, Jean-Bernard; Blot, Joël; N’Guerekata, Gaston Mandata; Pennequin, Denis (2006). "On C (n)-ost periodic solutions to some nonautonomous differential equations in Banach spaces" (PDF). Commentationes Mathematicae. 46 (2): 263–273.
- N'Guerekata, Gaston Mandata (1986). "Notes on almost-periodicity in topological vector spaces" (PDF). International Journal of Mathematics and Mathematical Sciences. 9: 201–204.
- N'Guerekata, Gaston Mandata (1984). "Almost-periodicity in linear topological spaces and applications to abstract differential equations" (PDF). International Journal of Mathematics and Mathematical Sciences. 7 (3): 529–540.
- N'Guerekata, Gaston Mandata (1983). "Quelques remarques sur les fonctions asymptotiquement presque automorphes". Les Annales des Sciences Mathématiques du Québec. 7 (2): 185–191.
- N'Guerekata, Gaston Mandata (1981). "Sur les fonctions presqu'automorphes d'équations différentielles abstraites" (PDF). Ann. Sci. Math. Québec. 5 (1): 69–79.

=== Books ===
- Abbas, Saïd; Benchohra, Mouffak; N'Guérékata, Gaston Mandata (2012). Topics in Fractional Differential Equations. Springer. ISBN 0-8218-2793-6.
- Liu, Fengshan; N’Guerekata, Gaston Mandata (2008). Discrete and Applied Mathematics. Nova Science Publishers. ISBN 978-1-60021-810-1.
- Liu, James H; N'guerekata, Gaston Mandata; Nguyen, Van Minh (2008). Topics On Stability And Periodicity In Abstract Differential Equations. Nova Science Publishers. ISBN 978-981-281-823-2.
- N'Guérékata, Gaston Mandata (2008). Focus on Evolution Equations. Nova Publishers. ISBN 978-1-60021-342-7.
- N'Guérékata, Gaston Mandata (2008). Leading-Edge Research on Evolution Equations. Nova Publishers. ISBN 978-1-60456-226-2.
- N'Guérékata, Gaston Mandata (2008). Trends in Evolution Equation Research. Nova Publishers. ISBN 978-1-60456-270-5.
- Liu, Fengshan; Nashed, Zuhair; N'Guérékata, Gaston Mandata; Pokrajac, Dragoljub; Qiao, Zhijun; Shi, Xiquan; Xia, Xianggen (2006). Advances in Applied and Computational Mathematics. Nova Science Publishers. ISBN 1-60021-358-8.
- N'Guérékata, Gaston Mandata (2005). Topics in Almost Automorphy. Springer. ISBN 0-387-22846-2.
- N'Guérékata, Gaston Mandata (2002). Introductory Algebra. Kendall/Hunt Publishing Company. ISBN 0-7872-9401-2.
- N'Guérékata, Gaston Mandata (2002). PreCalculus. Kendall/Hunt Publishing Company. ISBN 0-7872-9404-7.
- N'Guérékata, Gaston Mandata (2001). Almost automorphic and almost periodic functions in abstract spaces. Springer Science & Business Media. ISBN 978-0-306-46686-1.
