= François Naoueyama =

Central African Republic basketball player

Minister of the Environment and Ecology
- In office 19 January 2009 – 3 February 2013
- President: François Bozizé
- Prime Minister: Faustin-Archange Touadéra
- Preceded by: Yvonne Mboissona (as Water, Forests, Hunting and Fisheries and the Environment)
- Succeeded by: Mohamed Moussa Dahfane (as Water, Forests, Hunting and Fishing, Environment and Ecology)

Personal details
- Born: January 31, 1957 (age 69)
- Party: APRD
- Occupation: Basketball player
- Basketball career

Personal information
- Listed height: 6.6 ft 0 in (2.01 m)
- Listed weight: 187 lb (85 kg)

Career history
- ASOPT
Medals
Event	1st	2nd	3rd
FIBA Africa Championship	1	0	0
Total	1	0	0
Men's basketball
Representing Central African Republic
FIBA Africa Championship
Gold medal – first place	1987 Tunisia	

François Naoueyama (born 31 January 1957) is a Central African basketball player and politician. He competed at the 1988 Summer Olympics with the Central African Republic national basketball team. He scored 47 points in the team's 7 games.

== Career ==
=== Basketball ===
Naoueyama played for ASOPT. He represented the Central African Republic in the FIBA Africa Championship 1987, where his country won the tournament. He also part of CAR squad in the 1988. In his retirement, he was appointed as the treasurer of Central African Basketball Federation on 27 February 2021.

=== Politics ===
Naoueyama joined APRD in an unknown year. In January 2009, he was appointed as Minister of the Environment and Ecology. Touadera then reappointed Naoueyama on his cabinet as Minister of Environment and Ecology on 22 April 2011. Under his tenure, he signed a voluntary partnership agreement with the European Union to conserve the ecosystem on 28 November 2011 and proposed an integrated approach in the national REDD implementation. Furthermore, CAR received Equipment for Identifying Prohibited Substances from France in 2012. Apart from that, he became the speaker at IRENA event in Riocentro in 2012.
