= Bétoko =

Village in Lim-Pendé Prefecture, Central African Republic

- Location in Central African Republic
- Coordinates: 7°35′17″N 16°33′26″E
- Country: Central African Republic
- Prefecture: Lim-Pendé
- Sub-prefecture: Paoua
- Commune: Mia-Péndé

Government
  - Mayor: Nguétére Élisée

Bétoko is a village located in the Lim-Pendé Prefecture of the Central African Republic. Until December 2020, Bétoko was part of the Ouham-Pende.

== History ==
=== Central African Republic Bush War (2004–2007) ===
In late 2005, APRD took control of Bétoko. Responding to the attack on a commercial truck near the Chad-CAR border, Presidential Guard raided Bétoko on 15 March 2006 and killed one person.

ANT raided Bétoko on 10 July 2006. They opened fire indiscriminately toward the civilians. As a result, the residents fled Bétoko. They also looted the villages, raped five women, and captured young people.

=== Central African Civil War (2012-present) ===
In August 2013, FRUD-CA attacked Bétoko. On 26 or 27 December 2017, RJ occupied Bétoko. Consequently, the villagers fled to Paoua and Bedaya. They gradually returned to Bétoko starting on April to June 2018 thanks to the presence of MINUSCA troops.

== Economy ==
Bétoko has one market that attracted not only local merchants but also foreign merchants from Chad, Sudan, Cameroon, and Nigeria. In early 2006, the market was closed.

== Education ==
The village has two schools.

== Healthcare ==
There is one health post in Bétoko.
