= Tissi, Central African Republic =

Tissi Tissi-Fongoro
- Location in Central African Republic
- Coordinates: 10°55′25″N 22°50′36″E
- Country: Central African Republic
- Prefecture: Vakaga
- Sub-prefecture: Birao
- Commune: Ridina
- Time zone: UTC + 1

Tissi, also known as Tissi-Fongoro, is a village situated across the Central African Republic-Chad border in Vakaga Prefecture, Central African Republic. Tissi is the northernmost settlement in the Central African Republic.

== History ==
In 1962, Tissi had a population of 47 people.

FACA soldiers left Tissi in September 2013 due to lack of financial support.

In 2019, a conflict between Gula and Arabs ensued in Tissi due to the killing of an Arab by Gula. The ethnic tension was solved by the Sultan of Birao, in which he asked the perpetrator to pay diya 50 million CFA francs to the family victim. Kara youth militia supported by MLCJ and PRNC seized Tissi from FPRC on 4 October 2019.

A clash between Sudanese Misseriya and Chadian Zaghawa took place in Tissi on 26 May 2020. Sudanese Misseriya militia visited Tissi on 14 November 2021 to get money from the villagers. As of 2023, Tissi is under the CPC rebel control. FACA and Wagner attacked rebels in Tissi on 27 December 2025.

An armed group entered Tissi in May 2026, leading the residents fled the village on 11 May.

== Economy ==
Tissi became the smuggling center of weapons and ammunition from Sudan and Chad destined for Vakaga, Bamingui-Bangoran, and Nana-Grébizi. In 2016, Ex-Séléka and criminal groups went to Tissi to purchase arms and ammunition. FPRC used to have a custom office in Tissi for tax collection.
