= Central African Republic Air Force =

Aerial warfare branch of the Central African Republic Armed Forces

Central African Air Force
- Force Aérienne Centrafricaine
- Central African Republic Air Force Roundel
- Founded: 1961; 65 years ago
- Country: Central African Republic
- Type: Air force
- Role: Aerial warfare
- Part of: Central African Armed Forces
- Equipment: 6 aircraft

Insignia
- Roundel

- Fin flash

Aircraft flown
- Trainer: Aero L-39

The Central African Republic Air Force (French: Force Aérienne Centrafricaine) is the aerial warfare branch of the Central African Republic Armed Forces. As of 2017 it has been a branch of the Ground Force. The CAAF is reported to be almost inactive due to the unserviceability of its aircraft.

Dassault Mirage F1s of the French Air Force regularly patrol troubled regions of the country and also participate in direct confrontations.

== History ==
According to some sources, former President François Bozizé used the money he got from the mining concession in Bakouma to buy two old Mil Mi-8 helicopters from Ukraine and one Lockheed C-130 Hercules, built in the 1950s, from the U.S.

The CAAF received two Mi-24V/Mi-35 helicopters from Ukraine in 2011.

In May 2021, the CAAF received one Mi-8MT and one Mi-24V from Russia.

In early January 2023, it was reported that between 6 and 8 ex-Russian Air Force L-39 trainer jets were donated or delivered. Presumably, they will also be used in an attack role by Wagner forces present.

== Aircraft ==
=== Current inventory ===
Aircraft	Origin	Type	Variant	In service	Notes
Trainer aircraft
Aero L-39	Czech Republic	Primary trainer		6-8	
