= Ngaoundaye =

- sub-prefectures
- Location in Central African Republic
- Country: Central African Republic

Government
  - Sub-Prefect: Saint Sylvestre Blindepo

Ngaoundaye is a sub-prefecture of Lim-Pendé in the Central African Republic.

== Geography ==
Ngaoundaye is located near the borders of Chad and Cameroon : 5 km from Chad, 20 km from Cameroon, 70 km from Bocaranga and 600 km northwest of Bangui .

== History ==
The locality is erected in sub-prefecture of Ouham-Pendé on May 2, 2002 by dismemberment of the sub-prefecture of Bocaranga. In June 2007, following the murder of the sous-préfet, the Central African army burned part of the town. Occupied by the former Seleka in December 2013, the town of Ngaoundaye sees its population flee in waves to neighboring Cameroon and Chad.

== Administration ==
The sub-prefecture of Ngaoundaye is made up of five communes: Dilouki, Kodi, Lim, Yeme and Mbili . The locality of Ngaoundaye is located in the municipality of Lim.

== Population ==
The population of the sub-prefecture reaches 109,000 inhabitants including 30,000 displaced people in 2016, it is mainly composed of ethnic Pana, Gongué and Pondo.
