= Paoua =

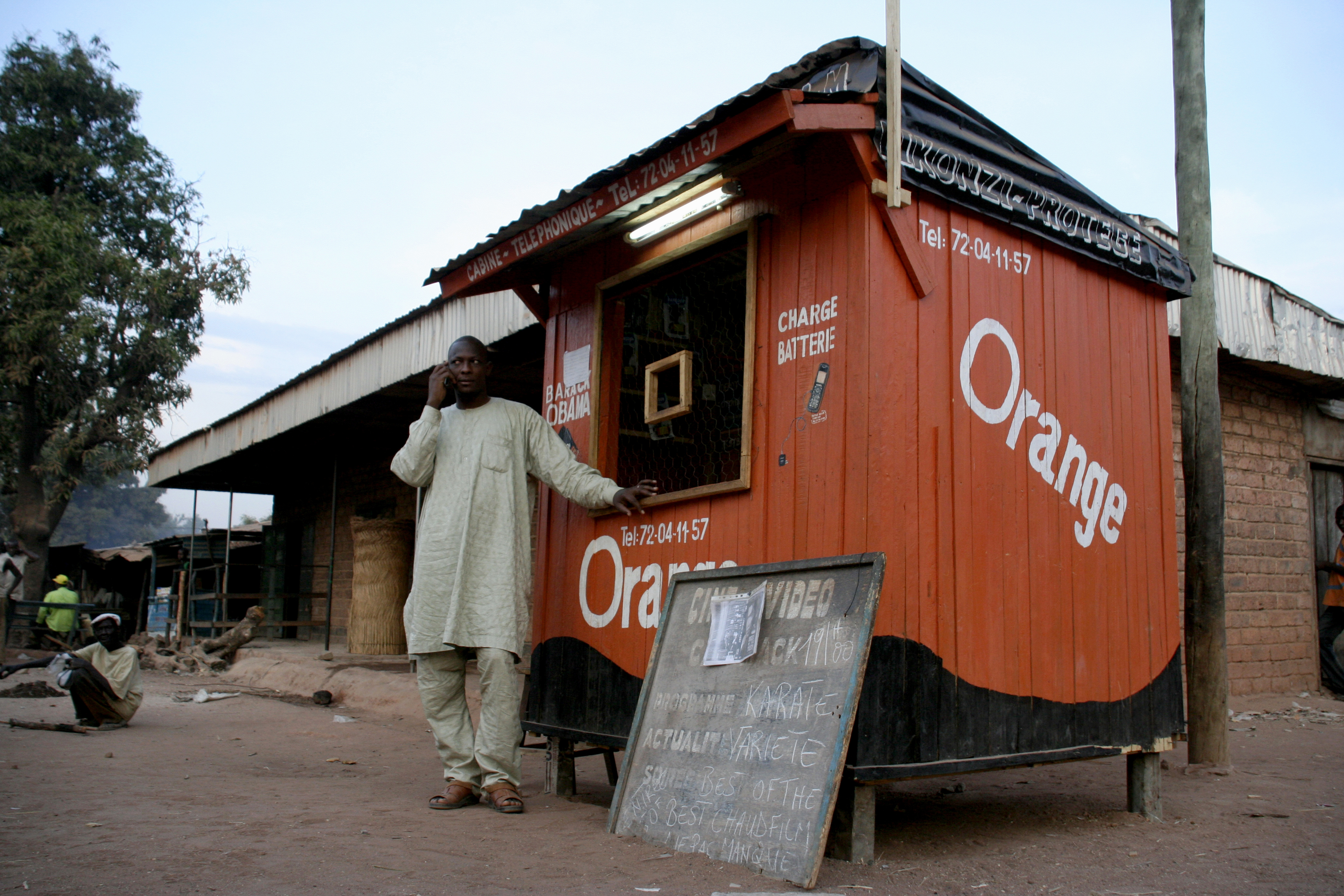

- Location in Central African Republic
- Coordinates: 7°15′N 16°26′E
- Country: Central African Republic
- Prefecture: Lim-Pendé

Government
  - Sub-Prefect: Boniface Désiré Bissadet
  - Mayor: Marc Ouefio

Population (2003)
  - Total: 17,370

Paoua is a town located in the Central African Republic prefecture of Lim-Pendé.The town is the birthplace of the former president of the Central African Republic, Ange-Félix Patassé and mathematician, Gaston Nguérékata.

== History ==
In 1994, electricity was installed in Paoua.

Paoua and its surrounding territories have become something of a ghost town after rebel and government soldier attacks in 2006 and 2007, with much of the population fleeing into the bush or into refugee camps.

On 28 March 2013 Paoua was captured by Séléka rebels. In January 2014 the town was captured by rebels from Revolution and Justice group. On 12 January 2018 MINUSCA launched operation Mbaranga securing Paoua city and forcing armed groups to move 50 km from the city. Central African Armed Forces were redeployed there subsequently on 28 January.

In December 2020, Paoua became the capital of Lim-Pendé Prefecture.
