= Central African Armed Forces =

Forces of the Central African Republic

- Forces armées centrafricaines (FACA)
- Founded: 1960
- Service branches: Ground Forces; Air Force; National Gendarmerie; Republican Guard; National Police
- Headquarters: Camp Le Roux, Bangui

Leadership
- Commander-in-Chief: Faustin-Archange Touadéra
- Minister of Defense: Rameaux-Claude Bireau
- Chief of the Defence Staff: Zéphirin Mamadou

Personnel
- Conscription: Voluntary, after the age of 18 years
- Active personnel: 30,000 (2022)

Expenditure
- Budget: $25 million (2021)
- Percent of GDP: 1.4% (2018)

Industry
- Foreign suppliers: Brazil; Belgium; China; India; Indonesia; Portugal; Russia; Germany; Japan; Singapore; South Africa; Sweden; Switzerland; United States; Vietnam Historical: British Empire; France; Israel; Soviet Union; South Africa; Socialist Republic of Romania; West Germany; Yugoslavia

Related articles
- History: Lord's Resistance Army insurgency Central African Republic Bush War; Central African Republic Civil War
- Ranks: Military ranks of Central African Republic

The Central African Armed Forces (French: Forces armées centrafricaines; FACA) are the armed forces of the Central African Republic and have been barely functional since the overthrow of François Bozizé in 2013. Today they are among the world's weakest armed forces, dependent on international support to provide security in the country. In recent years the government has struggled to form a unified national army. It consists of the Ground Force (which includes the air service), the gendarmerie, and the National Police.

Its disloyalty to the president came to the fore during the mutinies in 1996–1997, and since then has faced internal problems. It has been strongly criticised by human rights organisations due to terrorism, including killings, torture and sexual violence. In 2013 when militants of the Séléka rebel coalition seized power and overthrew President Bozizé they executed many FACA troops.

== History ==
=== Role of military in domestic politics ===
The military has played an important role in the history of Central African Republic. The immediate former president, General François Bozizé was a former army chief-of-staff and his government included several high-level military officers. Among the country's five presidents since independence in 1960, three have been former army chiefs-of-staff, who have taken power through coups d'état. No president with a military background has, however, ever been succeeded by a new military president.

The country's first president, David Dacko was overthrown by his army chief-of-staff, Jean-Bédel Bokassa in 1966. Following the ousting of Bokassa in 1979, David Dacko was restored to power, only to be overthrown once again in 1981 by his new army chief of staff, General André Kolingba.

In 1993, Ange-Félix Patassé became the Central African Republic's first elected president. He soon became unpopular within the army, resulting in violent mutinies in 1996–1997. In May 2001, there was an unsuccessful coup attempt by Kolingba and once again Patassé had to turn to friends abroad for support, this time Libya and DR Congo. Some months later, at the end of October, Patassé sacked his army chief-of-staff, François Bozizé, and attempted to arrest him. Bozizé then fled to Chad and gathered a group of rebels. In 2002, he seized Bangui for a short period, and in March 2003 took power in a coup d'état.

=== Importance of ethnicity ===
When General Kolingba became president in 1981, he implemented an ethnicity-based recruitment policy for the administration. Kolingba was a member of the Yakoma people from the south of the country, which made up approximately 5% of the total population. During his rule, members of Yakoma were granted all key positions in the administration and made up a majority of the military. This later had disastrous consequences when Kolingba was replaced by a member of a northerner tribe, Ange-Félix Patassé.

=== Army mutinies of 1996–1997 ===
Soon after the election in 1993, Patassé became unpopular within the army, not least because of his inability to pay their wages (partly due to economic mismanagement and partly because France suddenly ended its economic support for the soldiers' wages). Another reason for the irritation was that most of FACA consisted of soldiers from Kolingba's ethnic group, the Yakoma. During Patassé's rule they had become increasingly marginalised, while he created militias favouring his own Gbaya tribe, as well as neighbouring Sara and Kaba. This resulted in army mutinies in 1996–1997, where factions of the military clashed with the presidential guard, the Unité de sécurité présidentielle (USP) and militias loyal to Patassé.

- On April 18, 1996, between 200 and 300 soldiers mutinied, claiming that they had not received their wages since 1992–1993. The confrontations between the soldiers and the presidential guard resulted in 9 dead and 40 wounded. French forces provided support (Operation Almandin I) and acted as negotiators. The unrest ended when the soldiers were finally paid their wages by France and the President agreed not to start legal proceedings against them.
- On May 18, 1996, a second mutiny was led by 500 soldiers who refused to be disarmed, denouncing the agreement reached in April. French forces were once again called to Bangui (Operation Almadin II), supported by the militaries of Chad and Gabon. 3,500 foreigners were evacuated during the unrest, which left 43 persons dead and 238 wounded.
- On May 26, a peace agreement was signed between France and the mutineers. The latter were promised amnesty, and were allowed to retain their weapons. Their security was ensured by the French military.
- On November 15, 1996, a third mutiny took place, and 1,500 French soldiers were flown in to ensure the safety of foreigners. The mutineers demanded the discharge of the president.

On 6 December, a negotiation process started, facilitated by Gabon, Burkina-Faso, Chad and Mali. The military — supported by the opposition parties — insisted that Patassé had to resign. In January 1997, however, the Bangui Agreements were signed and the French EFAO troop were replaced by the 1,350 soldiers of the Mission interafricaine de surveillance des Accords de Bangui (MISAB). In March, all mutineers were granted amnesty. The fighting between MISAB and the mutineers continued with a large offensive in June, resulting in up to 200 casualties. After this final clash, the mutineers calmed.

After the mutinies, President Patassé suffered from a typical "dictator's paranoia", resulting in a period of cruel terror executed by the presidential guard and various militias within the FACA loyal to the president, such as the Karako. The violence was directed against the Yakoma tribe, of which it is estimated that 20,000 persons fled during this period. The oppression also targeted other parts of society. The president accused his former ally France of supporting his enemies and sought new international ties. When he strengthened his presidential guard (creating the FORSIDIR, see below), Libya sent him 300 additional soldiers for his own personal safety. When former President Kolingba attempted a coup d'état in 2001 (which was, according to Patassé, supported by France), the Movement for the Liberation of the Congo (MLC) of Jean-Pierre Bemba in DR Congo came to his rescue.

Crimes conducted by Patassé's militias and Congolese soldiers during this period were investigated by the International Criminal Court in 2007, who wrote that "sexual crimes far outnumber alleged killings", having identified hundreds of rape victims.

== Present situation ==
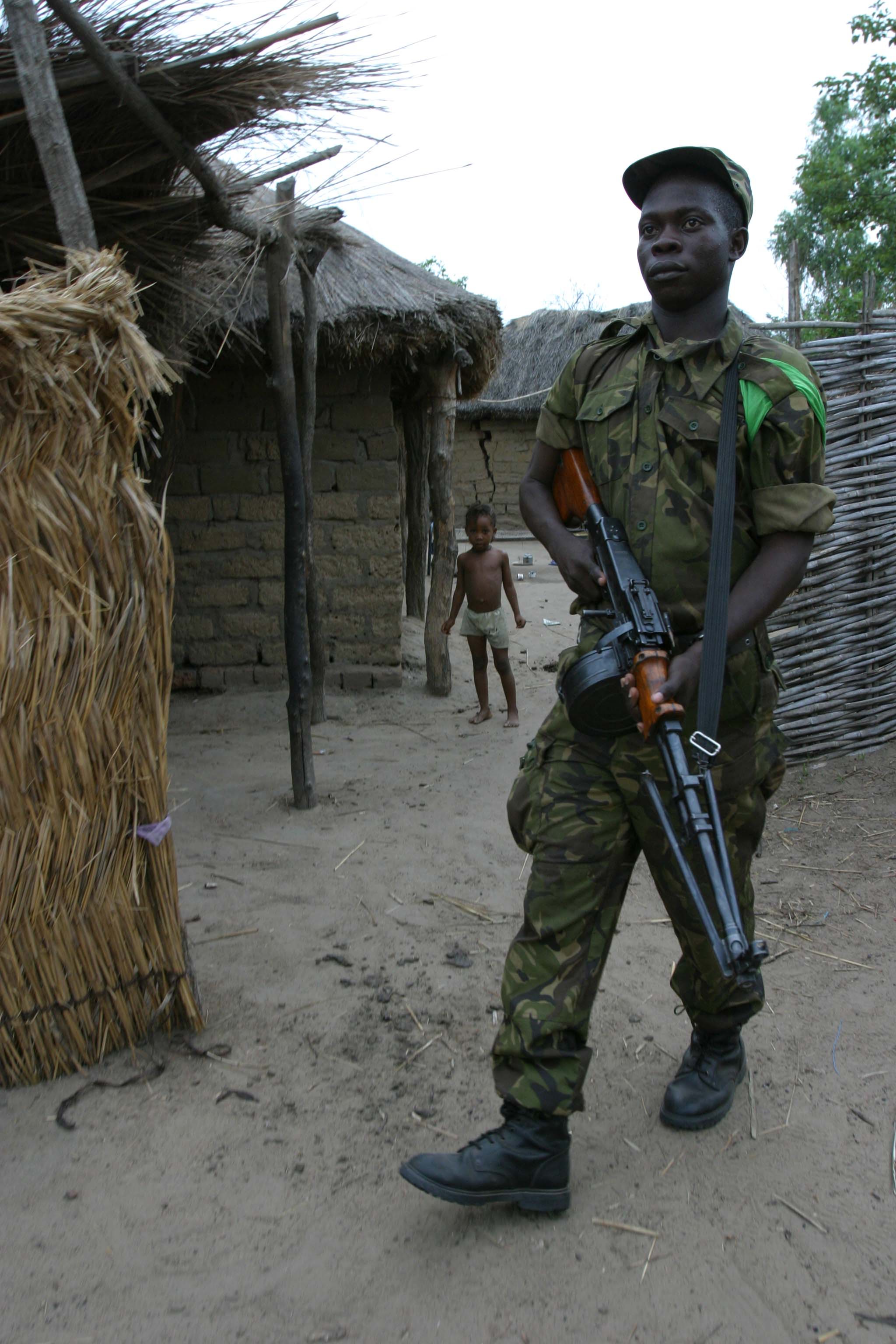
A FACA servicemember armed with a RPD machine gun on patrol during a 2007 joint military operation in Birao

The FACA has been dominated by soldiers from the Yakoma ethnic group since the time of Kolingba. It has hence been considered disloyal by the two northerner presidents Patassé and Bozizé, both of whom have equipped and run their own militias outside FACA. The military also proved its disloyalty during the mutinies in 1996–1997. Although Francois Bozizé had a background in FACA himself (being its chief-of-staff from 1997 to 2001), he was cautious by retaining the defence portfolio, as well as by appointing his son Jean-Francis Bozizé cabinet director in charge of running the Ministry of Defence. He kept his old friend General Antoine Gambi as Chief of Staff. Due to failure to curb deepening unrest in the northern part of the country, Gambi was in July 2006 replaced with Bozizé's old friend from the military academy, Jules Bernard Ouandé.

=== Military's relations with the society ===
The forces assisting Bozizé in seizing the power in 2003 were not paid what they were promised and started looting, terrorising and killing ordinary citizens. Summary executions took place with the implicit approval of the government. The situation has deteriorated since early 2006, and the regular army and the presidential guard regularly execute extortion, torture, killings and other human rights violations. There is no possibility for the national judicial system to investigate these cases. At the end of 2006, there were an estimated 150,000 internally displaced people in CAR. During a UN mission in the northern part of the country in November 2006, the mission had a meeting with a prefect who said that he could not maintain law and order over the military and the presidential guards. The FACA currently conducts summary executions and burns houses. On the route between Kaga-Bandoro and Ouandago some 2,000 houses have been burnt, leaving an estimated 10,000 persons homeless.

=== Reform of the army ===
Both the Multinational Force in the Central African Republic (FOMUC) and France are assisting in the current reform of the army. One of the key priorities of the reform of the military is to make it more ethnically diversified. It also seeks to integrate Bozizé's own rebel group (mainly consisting of members of his own Gbaya tribe). Many of the Yakoma soldiers who left the country after the mutinies in 1996–1997 have returned and should also be reintegrated into the army. At the same time, BONUCA holds seminars in topics such as the relationship between the military and civil parts of society.

=== Russian Involvement ===
Since 2018, Russia has increased involvement in the Central African Reppublic. It has sent both regular servicemen and the Wagner Group as part of training operations, and to fill security vacuums. There have also been instance of human rights violations as a result.

== Army equipment ==
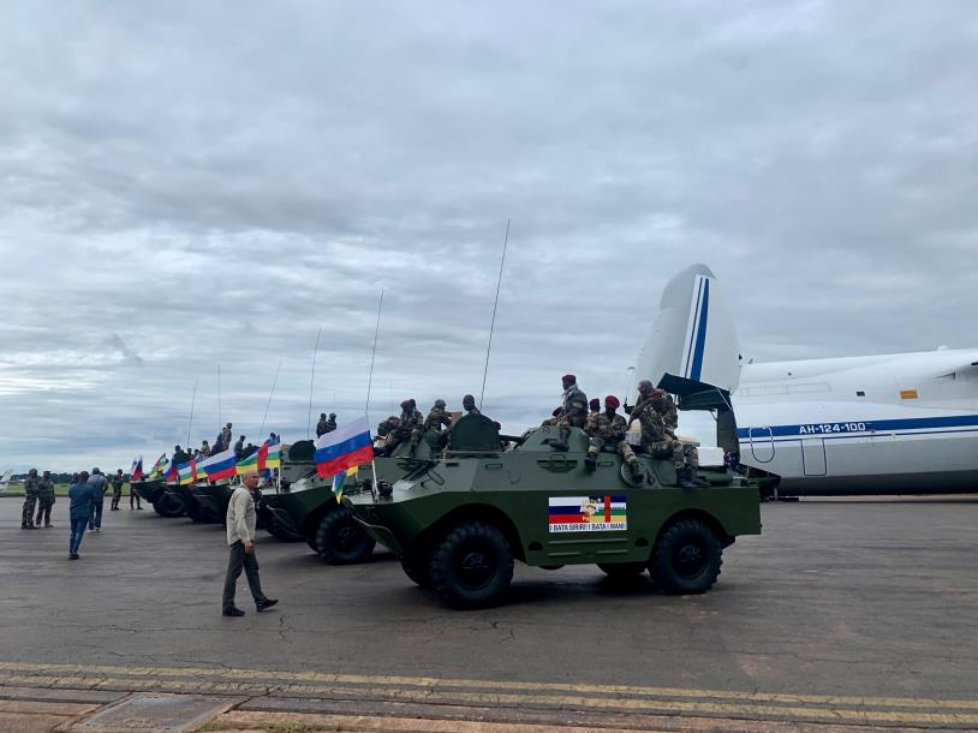
Delivery of Russian BRDM-2 armored vehicles to Central African Republic, October 2020

Most of the army's heavy weapons and equipment were destroyed or captured by Séléka militants during the 2012–2014 civil war. In the immediate aftermath of the war, the army was only in possession of 70 rifles. The majority of its arsenals were plundered during the fighting by the Séléka coalition and other armed groups. Thousands of the army's small arms were also distributed to civilian supporters of former President Bozizé in 2013. Prior to 2014, the army's stocks of arms and ammunition were primarily of French, Soviet, and Chinese origin.

In 2018, the army's equipment stockpiles were partly revitalized by a donation of 900 pistols, 5,200 rifles, and 270 unspecified rocket launchers from Russia.

=== Small arms ===
Name	Image	Caliber	Type	Origin	Notes
Pistols
MAC 50		9×19mm	Semi-automatic pistol	France	
Walther PP		.25 ACP	Semi-automatic pistol	Weimar RepublicNazi GermanyWest Germany/ Germany	
Manurhin MR 73		.357 Magnum	Revolver	France	
Submachine guns
Uzi		9×19mm	Submachine gun	Israel	
Carl Gustaf m/45		9×19mm	Submachine gun	Sweden	
Sten		9×19mm	Submachine gun	United Kingdom	
MAS-38		7.65×20mm	Submachine gun	French Third Republic / Vichy France /Provisional Government of the French Republic / French Fourth Republic	
MAT-49		9×19mm	Submachine gun	France	
Rifles
SKS		7.62×39mm	Semi-automatic rifle	Soviet Union	
AKM		7.62×39mm	Assault rifle	Soviet Union	
Zastava M70		7.62×39mm	Assault rifle	Yugoslavia	
PM md. 63		7.62×39mm	Assault rifle	Socialist Republic of Romania	
Type 56		7.62×39mm	Assault rifle	China	Some captured or inherited from Séléka stockpiles.
IMI Galil		5.56×45mm	Assault rifle	Israel	In service as of 2004; likely acquired from Zaire and Chad.
Vektor R4		5.56×45mm	Assault rifle	South Africa	
M14		7.62×51mm	Battle rifle	United States	
M16		5.56×45mm	Assault rifle	United States	
FAMAS		5.56×45mm	Bullpup Assault rifle	France	
FN FAL		7.62×51mm	Battle rifle	Belgium	
Heckler & Koch G3		7.62×51mm	Battle rifle	West Germany / Germany	
SIG SG 540		7.62×51mm	Battle rifle	Switzerland	
MAS-36		7.5×54mm	Bolt-action rifle	French Third RepublicVichy France /Provisional Government of the French Republic / French Fourth Republic	
Lee Enfield		.303 British	Bolt-action rifle	British Empire	
Sniper rifles
SVD; Type 85		7.62×54mmR	Designated marksman rifle Sniper rifle	Soviet Union; China	
Machine guns
SG-43 Goryunov		7.62×54mmR	Medium machine gun	Soviet Union	
RP-46		7.62×54mmR	Light machine gun	Soviet Union	
RPD		7.62×39mm	Squad automatic weapon	Soviet Union	
RPK		7.62×39mm	Squad automatic weapon	Soviet Union	
PKM		7.62×54mmR	General-purpose machine gun	Soviet Union	
DShK		12.7×108mm	Heavy machine gun	Soviet Union	
Type 67		7.62×54mmR	General-purpose machine gun	China	
FM 24/29		7.5×54mm	Light machine gun	France	
AA-52		7.62×54mmR	General-purpose machine gun	French Fourth Republic / France = (French Fifth Republic)	
FN MAG		7.62×51mm	General-purpose machine gun	Belgium	
Browning M1919		7.62×51mm	Medium machine gun	United States	
Browning M2		.50 BMG	Heavy machine gun	United States	
Rocket propelled grenade launchers
RPG-7		40mm	Rocket-propelled grenade	Soviet Union	

=== Anti-tank weapons ===
Name	Image	Type	Origin	Caliber	Notes
M40A1		Recoilless rifle	United States	106mm	14 in service.

=== Mortars ===
Name	Image	Type	Origin	Quantity	Status	Notes
PM-43		Mortar	Soviet Union	12		In store
Type 67		Mortar	China	Unknown		

=== Vehicles ===
==== Scout cars ====
Name	Image	Type	Origin	Quantity	Status	Notes
BRDM-2		Amphibious armored scout car	Soviet Union	21		
Daimler Ferret		Armored car Scout car	United Kingdom	8		

==== Infantry fighting vehicles ====
Name	Image	Type	Origin	Quantity	Status	Notes
Ratel-90		Infantry fighting vehicle	South Africa	2		Original order for 18 canceled.

==== Armored personnel carriers ====
Name	Image	Type	Origin	Quantity	Status	Notes
ACMAT TPK 420 BL		Armored personnel carrier	France	25		
VAB		Armored personnel carrier	France	10		

==== Utility vehicles ====
Name	Image	Type	Origin	Quantity	Status	Notes
Toyota Hilux		Utility vehicle	Japan	57		
CSK-131		Utility vehicle	China	12		

== Foreign military presence in support of the Government ==
=== Peacekeeping and peace enforcing forces ===
Since the mutinies, a number of peacekeeping and peace enforcing international missions have been present in Central African Republic. There has been discussion of the deployment of a regional United Nations (UN) peacekeeping force in both Chad and Central African Republic, in order to potentially shore up the ineffectual Darfur Peace Agreement. The missions deployed in the country during the last 10 years are the following:

International Peace Supporting Missions in Central African Republic
Mission Name	Organisation	Dates	Greatest Strength	Tasks
Inter-African Mission to Monitor the Implementation of the Bangui Agreements (Mission interafricaine de surveillance des Accords de Bangui, MISAB)	Burkina Faso, Chad, Gabon, Mali, Senegal and Togo	February 1997 to April 1998	820	To monitor the fulfilling of the Bangui Agreements
UN Mission in the Central African Republic (Mission des Nations Unies en République centrafricaine, MINURCA)	UN	April 1998 to February 2000	1,350	Maintain peace and security; supervise disarmament; technical assistance during 1998 elections
United Nations Peace-building Office (Bureau politique d'observation des Nations Unies en Centrafrique, BONUCA)	UN	February 2000 to 1 January 2010	Five military and six civilian police advisers to follow up on security-related reforms and to assist in the implementation of the training programmes for the national police.	Consolidate peace and national reconciliation; strengthen democratic institutions; facilitate international mobilization for national reconstruction and economic recovery. Succeeded by UN Integrated Peace-building Office (BINUCA).
Community of Sahel-Saharan States (CEN-SAD)	CEN-SAD	December 2001 to January 2003	300	Enforce and restore peace
Multinational Force in the Central African Republic (Force multinationale en Centrafrique, FOMUC)	Economic and Monetary Community of Central Africa (CEMAC)	January 2003 to July 2008	380	Ensure security; restructure FACA; and fight rebels in north-east. Replaced by MICOPAX.

=== Chad ===
In addition to the multilateral forces, CAR has received bilateral support from other African countries, such as the Libyan and Congolese assistance to Patassé mentioned above. Bozizé is in many ways dependent on Chad's support. Chad has an interest in CAR, since it needs to ensure calmness close to its oil fields and the pipeline leading to the Cameroonian coast, close to CAR's troubled northwest. Before seizing power, Bozizé built up his rebel force in Chad, trained and augmented by the Chadian military. Chadian President Déby assisted him actively in taking the power in March 2003 (his rebel forces included 100 Chadian soldiers). After the coup, Chad provided another 400 soldiers. Current direct support includes 150 non-FOMUC Chadian troops that patrol the border area near Goré, a contingent of soldiers in Bangui, and troops within the presidential lifeguard. The CEMAC Force includes 121 Chadian soldiers.

=== France ===
There has been an almost uninterrupted French military presence in Central African Republic since independence, regulated through agreements between the two Governments. French troops were allowed to be based in the country and to intervene in cases of destabilisation. This was particularly important during the cold war era, when Francophone Africa was regarded as a natural French sphere of influence.

Additionally, the strategic location of the country made it a more interesting location for military bases than its neighbours, and Bouar and Bangui were hence two of the most important French bases abroad.

However, in 1997, following Lionel Jospin's expression "Neither interference nor indifference", France came to adopt new strategic principles for its presence in Africa. This included a reduced permanent presence on the continent and increased support for multilateral interventions. In Central African Republic, the Bouar base and the Béal Camp (at that time home to 1,400 French soldiers) in Bangui were shut down, as the French concentrated its African presence to Abidjan, Dakar, Djibouti, Libreville and N'Djamena and the deployment of a Force d'action rapide, based in France.

However, due to the situation in the country, France has retained a military presence. During the mutinies, 2,400 French soldiers patrolled the streets of Bangui. Their official task was to evacuate foreign citizens, but this did not prevent direct confrontations with the mutineers (resulting in French and mutineer casualties). The level of French involvement resulted in protests among the Central African population, since many sided with the mutineers and accused France of defending a dictator against the people's will. Criticism was also heard in France, where some blamed their country for its protection of a discredited ruler, totally incapable of exerting power and managing the country. After the mutinies in 1997, the MISAB became a multilateral force, but it was armed, equipped, trained and managed by France. The Chadian, Gabonese and Congolese troops of the current Force multinationale en Centrafrique (FOMUC) mission in the country also enjoy logistical support from French soldiers.

A study carried out by the US Congressional Research Service revealed that France has again increased its arms sales to Africa, and that during the 1998–2005 period it was the leading supplier of arms to the continent.

== Components and units ==
=== Army ===
Central African republic Army unit

- 14 territorial infantry battalions
- 3 rapid intervention battalions
- 3 special forces battalions
- FACA support unit (artillery)

Air Force

The Air Force is almost inoperable. Lack of funding has almost grounded the air force apart from an AS 350 Ecureuil delivered in 1987. Mirage F1 planes from the French Air Force regularly patrolled troubled regions of the country and also participated in direct confrontations until they were withdrawn and retired in 2014. According to some sources, Bozizé used the money he got from the mining concession in Bakouma to buy two old Mi-8 helicopters from Ukraine and one Lockheed C-130 Hercules, built in the 1950s, from the US. In late 2019 Serbia offered two new Soko J-22 Orao attack aircraft to the CAR Air Force but it is unknown whether the orders were approved by the Air Force. The air force otherwise operates 7 light aircraft, including a single helicopter:

Aircraft	Type	Versions	In service	Notes
Aermacchi AL-60	Utility	AL-60C-5 Conestoga	6–10	
Eurocopter AS 350 Ecureuil	Utility helicopter	AS 350B	1	
Mil Mi-8 Hip	Transport helicopter	Mi-8	2	Unconfirmed
Lockheed C-130 Hercules	Transport	C-130	1	Unconfirmed
L-39 Albatros	Trainer		10	
Sukhoi Su-25	Fighter		8	

=== Garde républicaine (GR) ===
The Presidential Guard (garde présidentielle) or Republican Guard is officially part of FACA but it is often regarded as a separate entity under the direct command of the President. Since 2010 the Guard has received training from South Africa and Sudan, with Belgium and Germany providing support. GR consists of so-called patriots that fought for Bozizé when he seized power in 2003 (mainly from the Gbaya tribe), together with soldiers from Chad. They are guilty of numerous assaults on the civil population, such as terror, aggression, and sexual violence. Only a couple of months after Bozizé's seizure of power, in May 2003, taxi and truck drivers conducted a strike against these offenses. However, post-civil leaders have been cautious in attempting to significantly reform the Republican Guard.

=== New amphibious force ===
Bozizé has created an amphibious force. It is called the Second Battalion of the Ground Forces and it patrols the Ubangi river. The staff of the sixth region in Bouali (mainly made up of members of the former president's lifeguard) was transferred to the city of Mongoumba, located on the river. This city had previously been plundered by forces from the MLC, that had crossed the CAR/Congo border. The riverine patrol force has approximately one hundred personnel and operates seven patrol boats.

=== Veteran soldiers ===
A program for disarmament and reintegration of veteran soldiers is currently taking place. A national commission for the disarmament, demobilisation and reintegration was put in place in September 2004. The commission is in charge of implementing a program wherein approximately 7,500 veteran soldiers will be reintegrated in civil life and obtain education.

=== Discontinued groups and units that are no longer part of FACA ===
- Séléka rebels: the French document Spécial investigation: Centrafrique, au cœur du chaos envisions Séléka rebels as mercenaries under the command of the president. In the documentary the Séléka fighters seem to use a large number of M16 rifles in their fight against the Anti-balaka forces.
- FORSIDIR: The presidential lifeguard, Unité de sécurité présidentielle (USP), was in March 1998 transformed into the Force spéciale de défense des institutions républicaines (FORSDIR). In contrary to the army – which consisted mainly of southerner Yakoma members and which thereby was unreliable for the northerner president – this unit consisted of northerners loyal to the president. Before eventually being dissolved in January 2000, this highly controversial group became feared for their terror and troubled Patassé's relations with important international partners, such as France. Of its 1,400 staff, 800 were subsequently reintegrated into FACA, under the command of the chief-of-staff. The remaining 400 recreated the USP (once again under the command of the chief-of-staff).
- Unité de sécurité présidentielle (USP): USP was Patassé's presidential guard before and after FORSIDIR. When he was overthrown by Bozizé in 2003, the USP was dissolved and while some of the soldiers have been absorbed by FACA, others are believed to have joined the pro-Patassé Democratic Front of the Central African People rebel group that is fighting FACA in the north of the country.
- The Patriots or Liberators: Accompanied Bozizé when he seized power in March 2003. They are now a part of Bozizé's lifeguard, the Garde républicaine, together with soldiers from Chad.
- Office central de répression du banditisme (OCRB): OCRB was a special unit within the police created to fight the looting after the army mutinies in 1996 and 1997. OCRB has committed numerous summary executions and arbitrary detentions, for which it has never been put on trial.
- MLPC Militia: Le Mouvement de libération du peuple centrafricain (MLPC) was the armed component of former president Patassé's political party. The MPLC's militia was already active during the 1993 election, but was strengthened during the mutinies 1996 and 1997, particularly through its Karako contingent. Its core consisted of Sara people from Chad and Central African Republic, but during the mutinies it recruited many young people in Bangui.
- DRC Militia: Rassemblement démocratique centrafricain (RDC) is the militia of the party of General Kolingba, who led the country during the 1980s. The RDC's militia is said to have camps in Mobaye and to have bonds with former officials of Kolingba's "cousin" Mobutu Sese Seko in DR Congo.
