= Lim-Pendé =

Prefecture of the Central African Republic

- Prefecture
- Lim-Pendé in the Central African Republic
- Country: Central African Republic
- Capital: Paoua

Government
  - Prefect: Pierrette Benguere

Area
  - Total: 13,210 km^{2} (5,100 sq mi)

Population (2024 estimation)
  - Total: 469,545
  - Density: 35.54/km^{2} (92.06/sq mi)

Lim-Pendé is a prefecture in Central African Republic. In 2024, the prefecture had a population of around 469,545 inhabitants. The size of Lim-Pendé is 13,210 km^{2}. Paoua is the capital of the prefecture.

== History ==
Previously all of its territories were part of Ouham-Pende, Lim-Pendé was created on 10 December 2020.

== Administration ==
Lim-Pendé is divided into five sub-prefectures and 14 communes:

Sub Prefecture	Commune	Population (2022 estimation)
Paoua	Paoua	73 679
Paoua	Mom	25 046
Paoua	Bah-Bessar	42 629
Paoua	Mia-Péndé	44 817
Paoua	Nana-Barya	36 084
Paoua	Malé	12 470
Paoua	Bimbi	28 965
Paoua	Banh	43 482
Ngaoundaye	Dilouki	31 505
Ngaoundaye	Lim	40 428
Ngaoundaye	Yémé	19 061
Ndim	Ndim	10 049
Kodi	Kodi	43 985
Taley	Taley	6862
