= Isabelle Gaudeuille =

Central African politician and lawyer (born 1954)

Minister of Water and Forests of the Central African Republic (CAR)
- President: Alexandre-Ferdinand Nguendet
- Prime Minister: Mahamat Kamoun

Minister of Justice, Keeper of the Seals and Head of the Judicial Reform and Human Rights of the Central African Republic (CAR)
- In office January 2014 – August 2014
- President: Catherine Samba-Panza
- Prime Minister: André Nzapayeké
- Preceded by: Jacques Mbosso
- Succeeded by: Aristide Sokambi

Personal details
- Born: 1954 (age 71–72)
- Education: University of Paris Faculty of Law
- Occupation: Politician and lawyer

Charlotte Isabelle Gaudeuille (born 1954) is a Central African politician and lawyer. She served as Minister of Justice and Minister of Water and Forests.

== Career ==
Gaudeuille was born in 1954. She trained as a lawyer, achieving a doctorate from the University of Paris Faculty of Law.

In January 2014, Gaudeuille was appointed as Minister of Justice, Keeper of the Seals and Head of the Judicial Reform and Human Rights of the Central African Republic (CAR), serving in the government of André Nzapayeké. She was involved in the restoration of Ngaragba Central Prison in Bangui, which was partially destroyed and looted in December 2013.

In March 2014, Gaudeuille was questioned about the lack of arrest warrants issued on the culprits of embezzlement of public funds. Also in March 2014, Gaudeuille addressed the United Nations (UN) Human Rights Council, calling for a "Marshall Plan" to "save the country torn apart by interfaith violence." In June 2014, she formally requested that the International Criminal Court (ICC) investigate possible crimes against humanity in the CAR since August 2012.

Following an escalation of the conflict in the Central African Republic Civil War, in August 2014 Gaudeuille was appointed Minister of Water and Forests of the CAR, called to the position by interim president of the National Transitional Council (NTC), Catherine Samba-Panza, and serving in the government of Mahamat Kamoun. In this role, she awarded the French logging company Rougier a key contract in the CAR and visited Brussels, Belgium, in September 2015, to announce plans to audit the forest sector. She remained in post when the government was reshuffled in October 2015.
