= Marie-Noëlle Koyara =

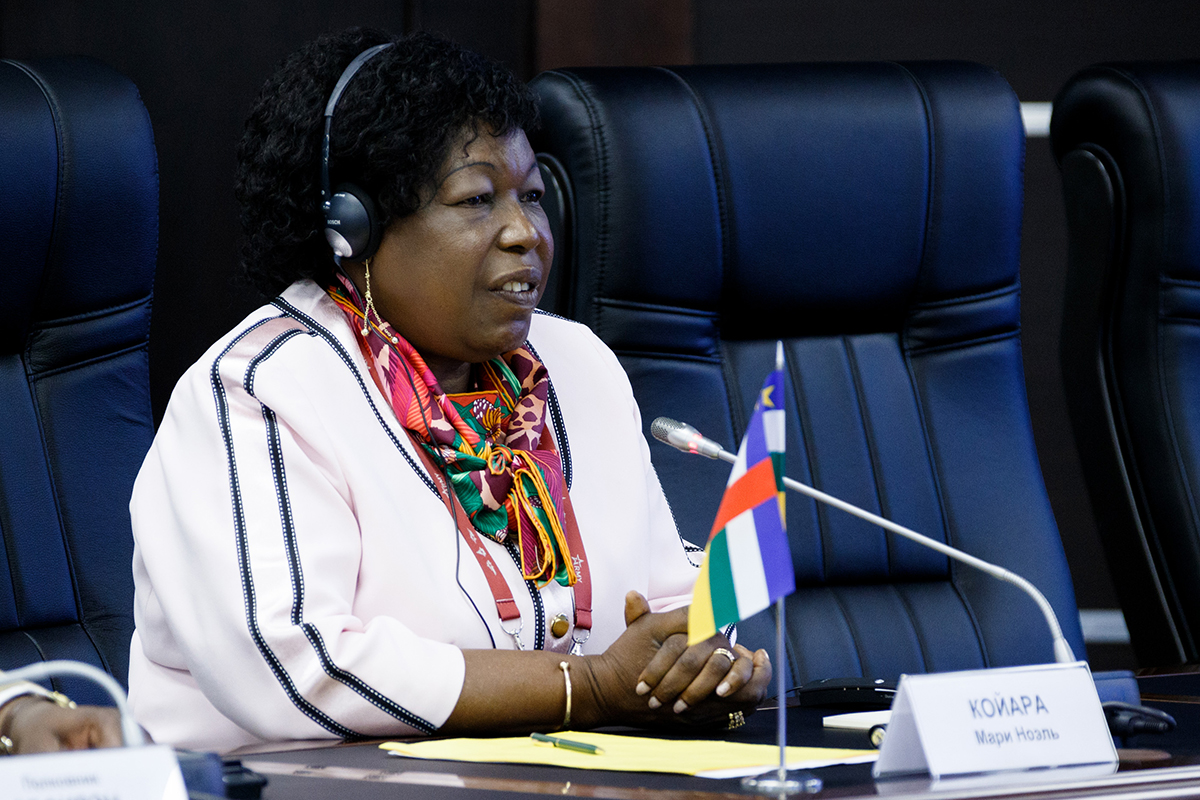

Minister of National Defense
- In office 17 January 2015 – 10 June 2021
- President: Catherine Samba-Panza; Faustin-Archange Touadéra
- Prime Minister: André Nzapayeké; Mahamat Kamoun; Simplice Sarandji
- Preceded by: Joseph Yakété
- Succeeded by: Rameaux-Claude Bireau

Personal details
- Born: December 14, 1955 (age 70) Bouar, Central African Republic
- Party: Independent
- Education: Technological University of Mbaïki
- Occupation: Agronomist

Marie-Noëlle Koyara (born 1955) is a former government minister of the Central African Republic. She served as Minister of National Defense in 2015 and again from 2017 to 2021. She was also the first female defense minister in the country since it declared its independence in 1960. She previously held a number of ministerial posts and served as the representative of the Central African Republic in the Food and Agriculture Organization.

Koyara studied at school at Bouar and Bangui. She dropped out of high school to be accepted to the National Police, where she became one of the first women even accepted. However, in the same year her mother died, and Koyara returned to high school, and eventually pursued university studies, graduating as an agriculture engineer. She held number of positions in the agricultural development projects, as well as worked with the African Development Foundation, before being appointed minister of rural promotion and later minister of women promotion and social affairs. She held these ministerial posts between 1993 and 1996.

Subsequently, Koyara became the Central African representative of the Food and Agriculture Organization. She lived in Cape Verde, then seven years in Burkina Faso, and then seven and half more years in Ivory Coast. In the second cabinet of Nicolas Tiangaye, in June 2013, she was appointed the Minister of Agriculture and Rural Development, then held the post of Minister of State of Labor and Public Affaires, becoming the first ever female Minister of State in the country, then Minister of State of Rural Development, and in January 2015 she was appointed the first State Minister of National Defense.
