= Arnaud Djoubaye Abazène =

Central African politician

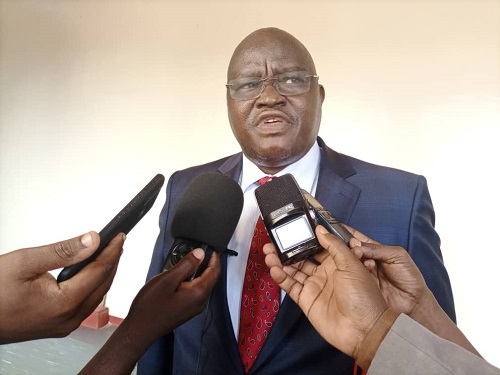

Minister of State for Justice, Promotion of Human Rights and Good Governance, Keeper of the Seals
- Incumbent
- Assumed office 8 April 2021
- President: Faustin-Archange Touadéra
- Prime Minister: Henri-Marie Dondra; Félix Moloua
- Preceded by: Flavien Mbata

Minister of Transport and Civil Aviation
- In office 22 March 2019 – 10 June 2021
- President: Faustin-Archange Touadéra
- Prime Minister: Firmin Ngrébada
- Preceded by: Théodore Jousso
- Succeeded by: Herbert Gontran Djono Ahaba
- In office 31 March 2013 – 11 April 2016
- President: Michel Djotodia; Catherine Samba-Panza
- Prime Minister: Nicolas Tiangaye; André Nzapayeké; Mahamat Kamoun
- Preceded by: Théodore Jousso
- Succeeded by: Théodore Jousso

Personal details
- Born: 20 October 1968 (age 57) Birao, Central African Republic
- Party: RPRC
- Education: University of Bangui; University of Yaoundé II
- Occupation: Politician; Judge

Arnaud Djoubaye Abazène (born 20 October 1968) is a Central African politician from Vakaga who is currently serving as the minister of justice and the founder of RPRC.

== Early life and education ==
Abazène was born in Birao on 20 October 1968. He completed his primary in Birao and secondary education at Lycèe d'Etat des Rapides and Lycèe des Martyrs. Afterward, he enrolled in bachelor's and master's degrees at the University of Bangui, majoring in public law, and then studied at École nationale d'administration et de magistrature in the judicial section. He continued his higher education at the University of Yaoundé II and finished it with a Diploma of Advanced Studies in Fundamental Public Law. Later, he pursued a doctoral degree at the University of Yaoundé II in Fundamental Public Law and successfully finished it in 2020.

== Career ==
=== Judicial ===
Abazène has served in several judicial positions, such as First Vice President of the High Court of Bangui, Chief Prosecutor of the Republic at the High Court of Bouar, Counsel at the Civil, Commercial, and Accusation Chamber of the Court of Appeal in Bangui, and President of the High Court of Batangafo. Moreover, he also took part in drafting the Constitution of 2016.

=== Minister ===
Tiangaye appointed Abazène as Minister of Transport and Civil Aviation on 31 March 2013 and held this position until April 2016. During this term, he signed two agreements with France on Bangui M'Poko International Airport expansion. Abazène served as a transport minister again from 2019 to 2021, and he launched the project of Bangui-Mpoko airport modernization phase 1. In April 2021, he became the interim Minister of Justice. As a minister of justice, he ordered the arrest of Abdoulaye Hissène on early September 2023, sued The Sentry for defamation, and blocked the evacuation of Juan Rémy Quignolot. On 15 September 2022, Touadera appointed Abazène as the vice president of the Central African Republic new constitution drafting committee.

As a minister, Abazène also carries several responsibilities beyond his ministerial tasks. He led an armed group consisting of youth in Vakaga to block armed supplies for CPC and protect the communities from the Misseriya militia attack. Furthermore, he became the head of the government delegation to conduct talks with Sidiki Abass and the government negotiator for the release of three kidnapped UNOPS workers.

== Personal life ==
Abazène has married thrice and belongs to Goula. He is the cousin of Michel Djotodia.
