= Ouandja =

- Location in Central African Republic
- Coordinates: 9°16′4″N 22°42′9″E
- Country: Central African Republic
- Prefecture: Vakaga
- Sub-prefecture: Ouandja
- Commune: Ouandja

Government
  - Sub-prefect: Bonanne Nahordji Ongnegawa
  - Mayor: Abdala Mahamat

Ouandja, also written as Ouandjia, is a town situated in Vakaga Prefecture, Central African Republic.

== History ==
Ouandja had a population of 383 people in 1962.

During the Central African Bush War, rebels occupied the town, which was then recaptured by FACA and Presidential Guard forces on 11 December 2006. After capturing the town, they burned 57 homes, the clinic, the school, the mayor's office, and the gendarmerie building and killed seven people, including a former MP member, Zacharia Rizégala. In late 2007, UFDR reportedly controlled the town and erected barriers.

In the early August 2009, UFDR rebels attacked Kara residents in Ouandja to avenge the Kara militias' raid in Délembé, Sergobo, and Tala. The UN reported that Ouandja served as main checkpoint for Sudanese trucks to travel to Bria and other places in 2015. In January 2023, the government controlled the town and deployed placed 26 FACA soldiers there.

== Demographics ==
Gula make up the majority of the Ouandja population. Gula sub-group that inhabits this town is Mere.

== Education ==
There is a school in the town.

== Healthcare ==
Ouandja has one health post.

== Bibliography ==
- HRW, HRW (18 April 2008). State of Anarchy: Rebellion and Abuses against Civilians (PDF) (Report). Human Rights Watch.
