= Central African Republic conflict (2013–2014) =

Civil war

Central African Republic conflict under the Djotodia administration
- Part of the Central African Republic Civil War
Date	13 April 2013 – 10 January 2014 (8 months and 28 days)
Location	Central African Republic
Result	Resignation of President Michel Djotodia and replacement by caretaker Alexandre-Ferdinand Nguendet; Resignation of Prime Minister Nicolas Tiangaye; Catherine Samba-Panza appointed interim president by the CNT, leadership accepted by both sides André Nzapayeké appointed as prime minister Continued sectarian conflict

Belligerents
Central African Republic: Séléka (Muslim militia): CPJP; CPSK; FDPC; FPR; UFDR	Anti-balaka militia: MRPRC; Pro-Bozizé militias Other Christian militias	(United Nations) MISCA: Chad; Republic of Congo; Democratic Republic of Congo; Burundi; Gabon; France; United Kingdom (support) (United States) Africom (logistics)

Commanders and leaders
(Central African Republic) Michel Djotodia (Central African Republic) Nicolas Tiangaye	(Central African Republic) Levy Yakete (Central African Republic) François Bozizé (Central African Republic) Alexandre-Ferdinand Nguendet	(France) François Hollande (France) Jean-Yves Le Drian

Casualties and losses
8 killed	Unknown	(France); 2 soldiers killed (Chad); 6 peacekeepers, 5 soldiers killed, 4 troops injured (Republic of the Congo); 2 peacekeepers, 1 soldier killed
- Total: At least 500 civilians killed (7–8 December and following week) (ICRC); Thousands killed(Alleged by human rights organisations)

An internal conflict in the Central African Republic (CAR) started essentially on 13 April 2013, when the government of President Michel Djotodia officially took over. The fighting was between the government of the Central African Republic's former Séléka coalition of rebel groups, who are mainly from the Muslim minority, and the mainly Christian anti-balaka coalition. The conflict was part of the ongoing Central African Republic Civil War (2012–present). International organisations, such as the United Nations, had warned of a possible genocide. UNSC resolution 2122 authorised the African-led International Support Mission to the Central African Republic (MISCA) to be deployed to the country, and France to lead operations with additional troops sent to bolster its force in the country. Following a summit of Economic Community of Central African States (CEEAC), including the attendance of all the country's MPs, Djotodia resigned from the presidency on 10 January 2014. The National Transitional Council chose Bangui mayor Catherine Samba-Panza as interim president on 20 January 2014. A period of lawlessness prevailed during the early days of her presidency with people moving into religiously cleansed neighbourhoods as the UN warned of a genocide. Anti-Balaka attacks continued against Muslim civilians.

== Background ==
The Central African Republic Bush War (2004–2007) began with the rebellion by the Union of Democratic Forces for Unity (UFDR) in North-Eastern CAR, led by Michel Djotodia, after François Bozizé seized power in 2003. This quickly escalated into major fighting during 2004. During this conflict, the UFDR rebel forces fought the CAR government concurrently with several other rebel groups that were located in other parts of the country, including the Groupe d'action patriotique pour la libération de Centrafrique (GAPLC), the Convention of Patriots for Justice and Peace (CPJP), the People's Army for the Restoration of Democracy (APRD), the Movement of Central African Liberators for Justice (MLCJ), and the Front démocratique Centrafricain (FDC). On 13 April 2007, a peace agreement between the government and the UFDR was signed in Birao. Further negotiations resulted in an agreement in 2008 for reconciliation, a unity government, and local elections in 2009 and parliamentary and presidential elections in 2010. The new unity government that resulted was formed in January 2009.

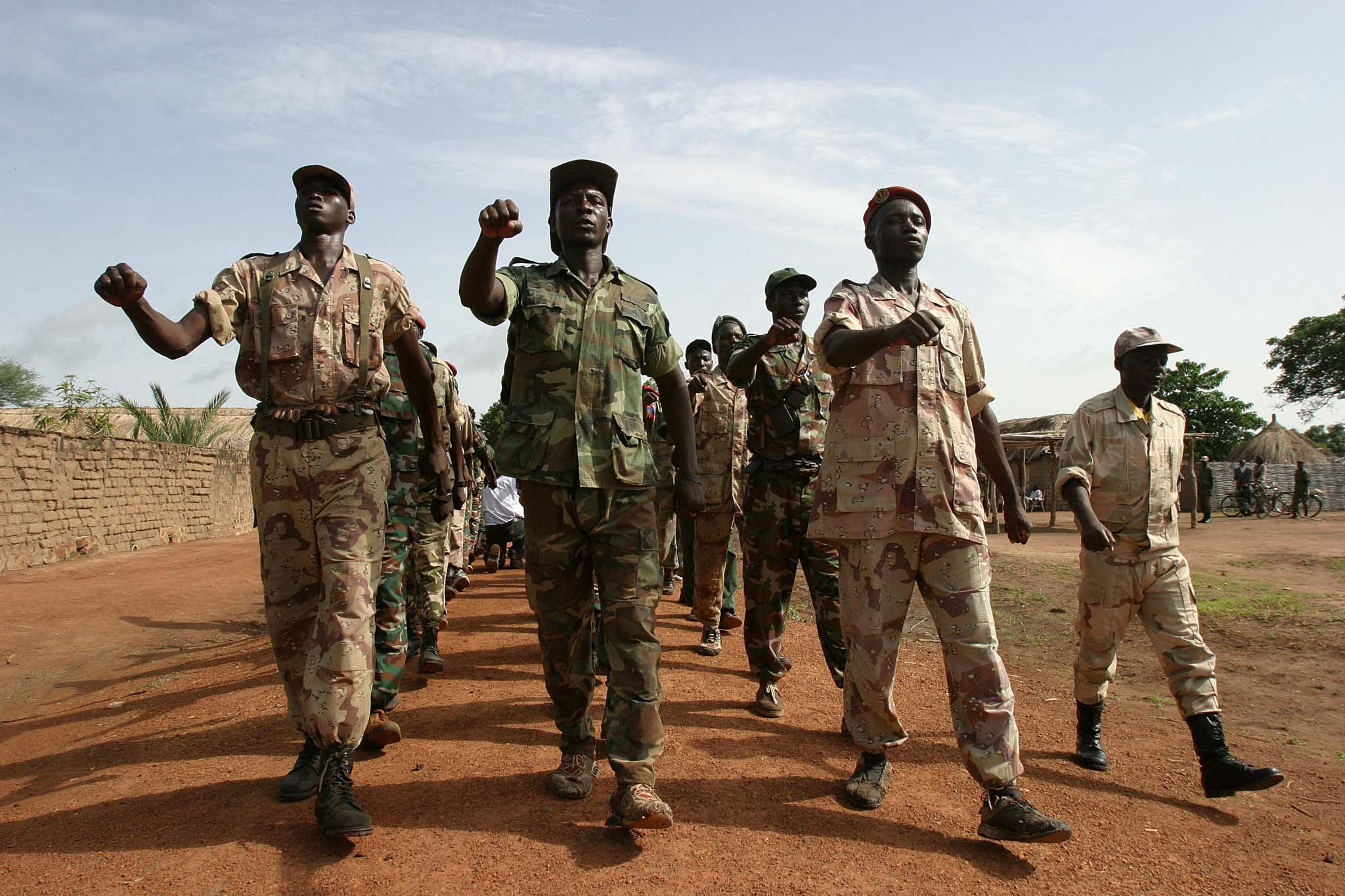
Rebels in northern Central African Republic in June 2007.

In 2012, the Séléka alliance conflict began against the government of François Bozizé. Though there were intermittent halts in the fighting, the group eventually took over the capital, Bangui and Bozizé fled the country. CEEAC brokered an agreement forming a transitional assembly, the National Transitional Council (CNT); the body then chose Michel Djotodia to lead the country to an election.

=== Militarisation ===
Since the Bozizé government was ousted, the writ of the state has apparently been effected with a prevalence of "insecurity" as a result of the proliferation of armed groups. Though state institutions were already considered weak by Western norms, they disintegrated following looting and the destruction of most of the country's administrative, police and judicial infrastructure. Séléka's leadership failed to have effective control over the various armed forces within its coalition, thus, despite being officially dissolved on 13 September, its former constituents are still able to carry on. Furthermore, fighting between various armed forces has affected many parts of the country. Militarisation has been at further risk over the emergence of militias opposed to Séléka; on the Séléka side, the participation of significant numbers of fighters from Chad and Darfur, Sudan has heightened the risk of cross-border movement of armed groups, as well as small arms.

== Fighting ==
Since the new government came to power fighting has continued throughout the country with a law and order problem and other instances of violence such as sexual violence. There has also been ethno-religious fighting between the Muslim and Christian communities. Furthermore, there have been concerns of Islamists setting up a base in the country, including Boko Haram who are already present in neighbouring Cameroon.

The increasing violence was largely from reprisal attacks on civilians from Séléka's mainly Muslim fighters and Christian militias called "anti-balaka", meaning 'anti-machete' or 'anti-sword'. As many Christians had sedentary lifestyles and many Muslims were nomadic, claims to the land were yet another dimension of the tensions.

According to Human Rights Watch, Séléka gunmen killed at least 40 civilians, and intentionally destroyed 34 villages or towns from 11 February to 2 June 2013. Witnesses said the attackers were Séléka fighters in uniform, sometimes in cooperation with armed Mbarara – nomadic pastoralists who move their cattle between Chad and the Central African Republic – who traveled on horseback or motorcycle. The Séléka fired on civilians, often while they were fleeing.

In August 2013, the UN Security Council warned that the Central African Republic poses a "serious threat" to regional stability following the rebel takeover in March and there had been "a total breakdown in law and order". More than 200,000 people fled their homes and many are living rough in the bush, said UN humanitarian chief Valerie Amos, who had visited the country. Save the Children spokesman Mark Kaye reported that the country's healthcare system was in ruins after being looted: "All the pharmacies have been hit. There are no medications, no drugs, equipment has been stolen. I've been to hospitals where even the mattresses have been stolen."

In August 2013, the deposed President Francois Bozize told French media he intended to return to power and see the rebels ousted, and had formed the Front for the Return of Constitutional Order in the CAR (French: Front pour le retour de l'ordre constitutionnel en Centrafrique or FROCCA), a group aiming to bring the world's attention to actions of Séléka and their reported crimes.

=== Disbandment of Séléka and start of hostilities ===
In September 2013, Michel Djotodia announced that Séléka had been dissolved but most of the militias refused to disband. There were reports of widespread rape, killing, looting and destruction of villages and administrative systems by these militias. "Heavy fighting" between unidentified armed groups in and around the towns of Bossembele and Bossangoa was reported in mid-September 2013. Nearly 400,000 people were displaced, mostly to the bush, and 68,000 had fled to neighboring counties. Torture, killings and looting were suggested to have become widespread as chaos spread.

=== Sectarian conflict ===
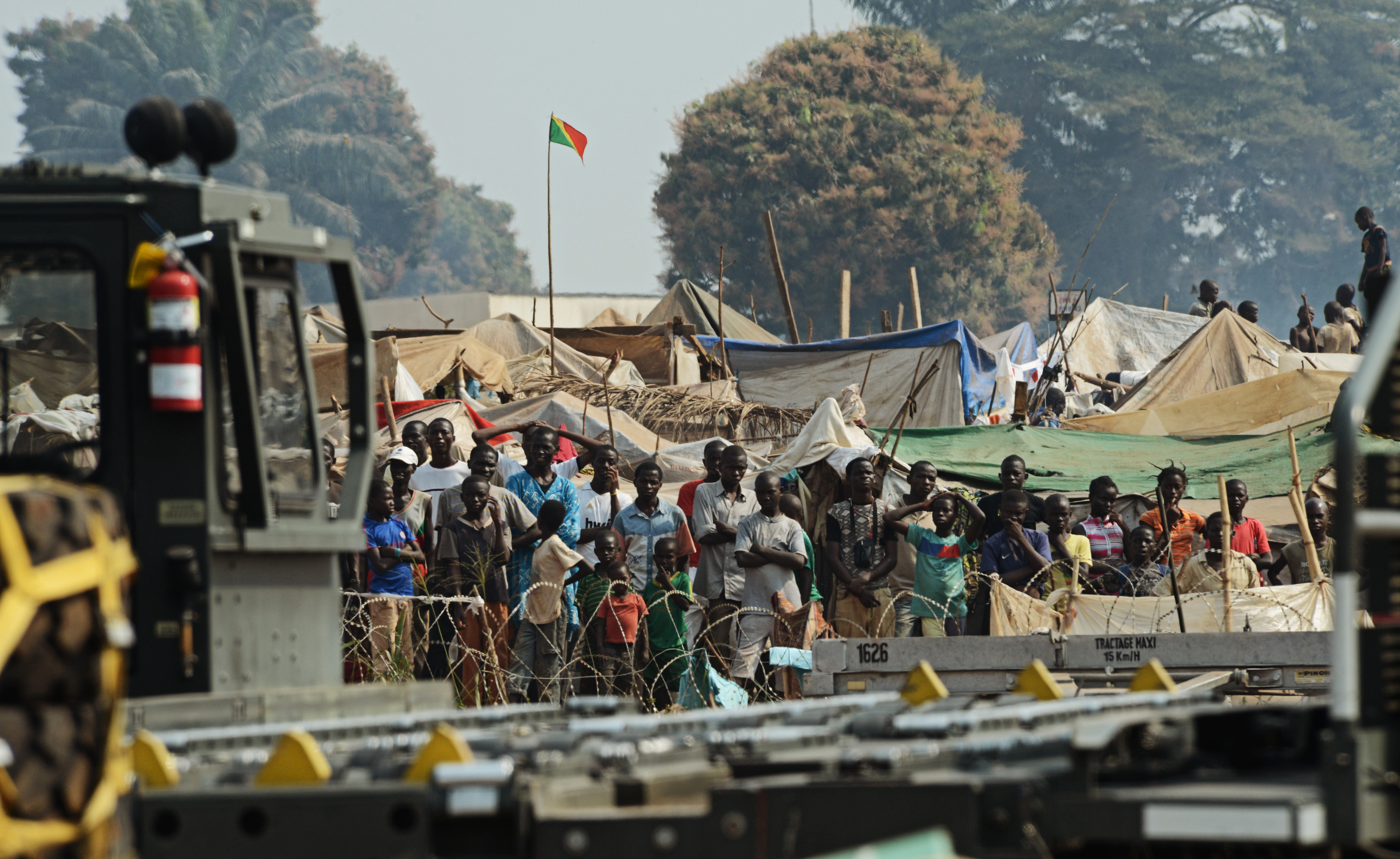
Refugees of the fighting in the Central African Republic, 19 January 2014

In November 2013, the UN warned the country was at risk of spiralling into genocide and said it was "descending into complete chaos", while France described the country as "...on the verge of genocide." The increasing violence was largely from reprisal attacks on civilians from Séléka's mainly Muslim fighters and Christian militias called "anti-balaka", meaning 'anti-machete' or 'anti-sword'. As many Christians had sedentary lifestyles and many Muslims were nomadic, claims to the land were yet another dimension of the tensions.

On 4 December 2013, the UN Security Council urgently voted in favor of the resolution that UN MISCA peacekeepers can use all force necessary to protect the lives of civilians, after reports began emerging from the capital Bangui of widespread violence taking place. Hours after the vote, French President François Hollande announced his country is committed to immediate action in order to stop the wave of killings, saying he has "decided to act immediately, in other words, this evening. Local witnesses and aid workers on the ground in the capital reported at least 105 bodies had been collected after heavy clashes broke out between the mainly Muslim former rebels currently in charge of the country and a mix of local Christian militia and fighters loyal to ousted president Francois Bozize. In addition to the authorization of force, the Security Council resolution imposed an arms embargo on the country and asked the UN to prepare for a possible peacekeeping mission.

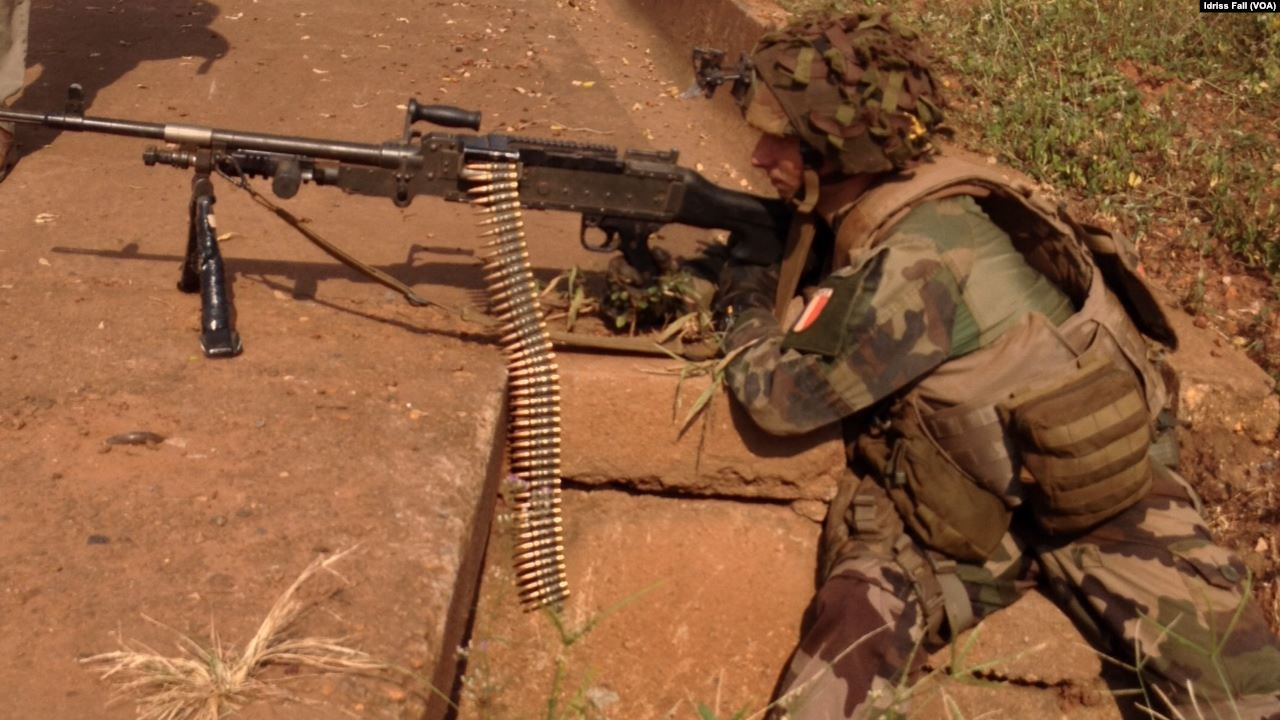
French soldier in position in Bangui.

On 6 December 2013, the local branch of the Red Cross announced that a total of 281 bodies had been collected after two days of violence in and around the capital Bangui. An official confirmed that the toll was expected to rise significantly, as workers had to stop as night fell. During these clashes, 10 armed attackers of unknown affinity in a pickup truck attacked a French army patrol near Bangui airport. The French troops however overpowered the gunmen, killing four of them, injuring six and destroying their truck. This was the first military engagement in France's intervention in CAR. Thousands of Christian civilians sought refuge at the French-held airport from the mostly Muslim ex-rebels. By 8 December, the death toll had reached 394 and by 9 December 465 people had been killed in total. Amnesty International supported the number of around 400 dead as the official count, but estimated that as many as 1,000 people may have been killed, with many hastily buried before they could be accounted for.

The ICRC claimed that at least 500 people had died during the 7–8 December weekend and the following week. However, the number does not include Muslim casualties who were taken instead to mosques for burial. Another 160 people were killed in the rest of the country, according to the UNHCR, who also gave figures of 450 dead in Bangui. Its spokesman, Afrian Edwards, said: "We are seeing a further deterioration in the situation in Central African Republic." The UNHCR's Maurice Azonnankpo said: "We have noticed several cases of traumatized people, a few cases of survivors of gender-based violence, and also a few cases of separated children [from] their families. We have our teams at all the [internally displaced persons] sites where they are conducting distribution of non-food items... to respond to the needs of these IDPs in Bangui." In Bohang village, the anti-Balaka targeted and killed 27 Muslims. On 8 December, a hospital was also attacked after ex-Séléka rebels attacked the Amitie hospital at night pulling out those injured in the hospital and shooting them resulting in at least 10 deaths before the hospital was abandoned. The next day, the government had ordered all but the foreign peacekeepers and presidential guard off the streets.

On 13 December, African peacekeepers fired warning shots into a mob targeting Muslims who had taken refuge in a church compound. The next day, sectarian fighting continued in the capital between gangs of Christian and Muslim youths following a night in which a Christian taxi driver was killed by the former Séléka fighters. Civilians were said to be concerned about a cycle of retaliatory violence. On the same day, French forces backed by air power fought against the rebels; French Defence Minister Jean-Yves Le Drian also arrived in the country to meet troops and commanders. On 15 December, Djotodia talked with both militias and considered a possible amnesty for both sides.

An Al Jazeera crew in the country reported seeing burnt Muslim houses standing empty with the former residents having left. In addition to homes having been torched, there were also child soldiers on the streets as at least some were said to have been willing to fight. The violence has spread outside Bangui. An UNHCR spokesman said on 18 December that "in Bangui, our staff are reporting continued shooting and a mood of widespread fear. We continue to hear of attacks against Christians by former Séléka [mostly Muslim disbanded militias] with looting, killing and houses being set on fire."

On 19 December, a Chadian soldier was injured in an attack while on patrol. Residents in the Gobango neighbourhood reported clashes between rival Muslim and Christian militias, after Chadian soldiers began shooting at civilians. The next day, more fighting occurred leading to at least 37 deaths over 24 hours. One of the incidents included peacekeepers trying to disarm a group of former Séléka rebels that led to the deaths of three rebels and at least one soldier. A mob of young men wearing crucifixes also attacked a mosque and stripped apart the iron roof with one attacker saying "we don't want mosques in our country." The government issued a statement that day that read Chadian soldiers had responded to an attack on them by Christian militias who accused them of kidnapping and terrorizing. Late on 22 December, a MISCA Congolese soldier stationed in Bossangoa was killed by hacking by the anti-Balaka fighters. In contrast to the earlier welcome of French soldiers, dozens of Muslims marched in Bangui on 25 December demanding the departure of the French troops. Turning point was suggested to be Hollande's calling for Djotodia to leave, the country's first Muslim president. The day before, the Chadian and Burundian peacekeepers, as a part of MISCA, exchanged fire in Bangui. The Chadians are perceived by the Christian majority of the country during Christmas as being pro-Séléka due to their religion. The head of the Burundian contingent, Lieutenant-Colonel Pontien Hakizimana, said from Bujumbura that his soldiers intercepted and were disarming six former rebels when Chadian troops on a passing truck threw a grenade and opened fire on them, then prompting some Burundian forces to return fire and the Séléka rebels then firing indiscriminately; in the ensuing firefight three Chadians soldiers were wounded. Hakizimana then added that "the Chadians soldiers came back in greater numbers in the afternoon and attacked our positions."

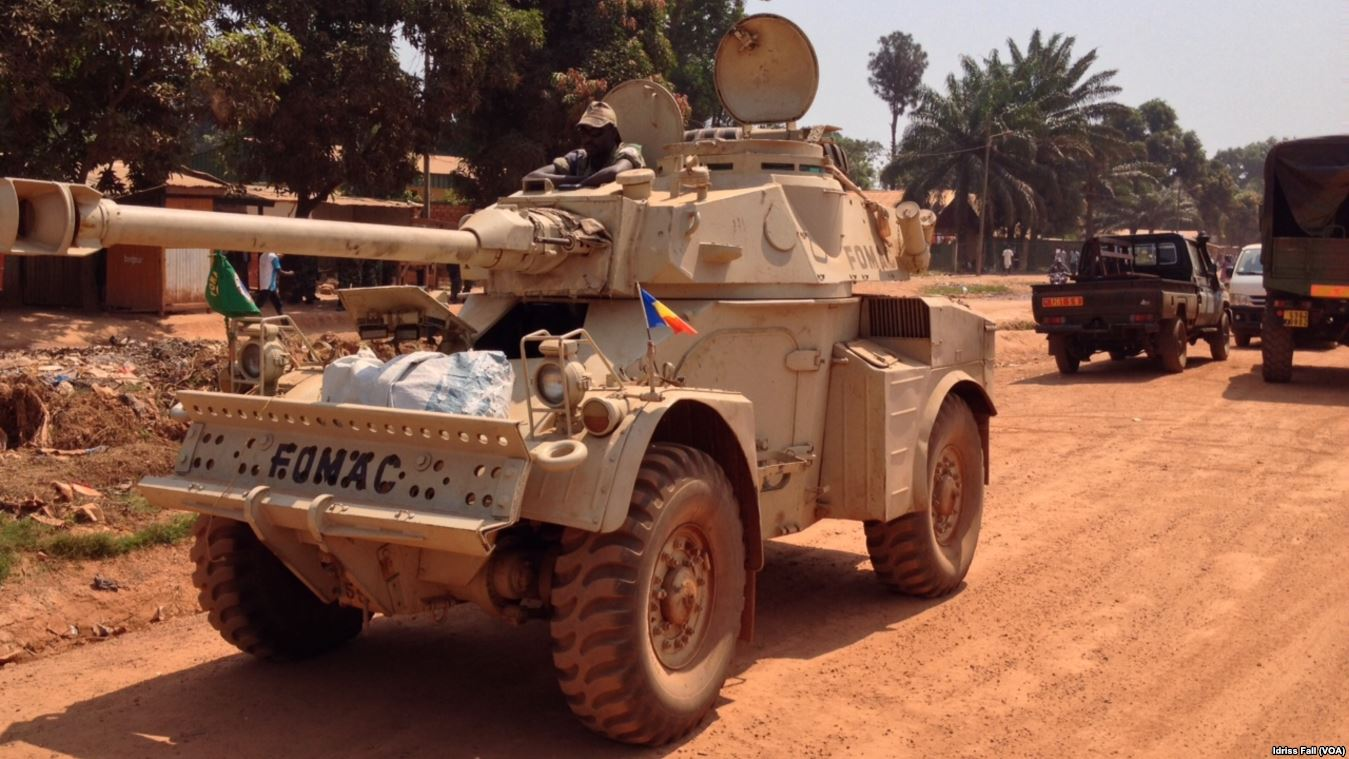
Eland armoured car of the Chadian Army in Bangui, December 2013.

On 20 December, Estonia announced it was considering sending troops to the Central African Republic.

On 27 December, two Congolese police officers were killed after unidentified gunmen ambushed them in Bangui.

On 29 December, peacekeepers from Rwanda were promised to be sent to the Central African Republic.

Sectarian violence continue to escalate, and Djotodia faced pressure from regional leaders due to his apparent inability to control the situation. Djotodia and Tiangaye both resigned at a summit held in N'Djamena on 10 January 2014. Among the chaos in Bangui surfaced accounts of lynching and cannibalism in international media. Foreigners in Central African Republic, especially those from Chad and West Africa, left the country en masse. According to International Organization for Migration, about 60,000 African immigrants asked their embassies for aid. After the resignations of Djotodia and Tiangaye, Alexandre-Ferdinand Nguendet took over as interim leader and speaker of the provisional parliament. On 10 April 2014 the UN Security Council approved a resolution sponsored by the Central African Republic's former colonial power, France, to create a peacekeeping force of over 11,800 soldiers to prevent further sectarian violence.

=== Djotodia resignation ===
On 9 January 2014, Djotodia left for Chad to attend a CEEAC summit amid media speculation he was going to resign, though government officials denied this. The entire 135-member parliament was summoned to the summit in N'Djamena to discuss peace talks, which were suspended on 9 January while awaiting their arrival. CEEAC Secretary-General Ahmat Allami said: "If you are incapable, if you are powerless in the face of the situation, make way for others who can do a better job." Likewise, in opening the meeting, host president, Idriss Deby, called for "concrete and decisive action" to stop the violence.

Due to the continued sectarian violence, Djotodia faced pressure from the group's leaders to resign. As a result, after the two-day summit, Djotodia resigned from the presidency on 10 January 2014. A statement by Allami announced the resignation and added that a new leader would be chosen after talks in Bangui. Speaker of parliament, Alexandre-Ferdinand Nguendet, became acting president. Prime Minister Nicolas Tiangaye also resigned. Following the announcement gunfire and celebration occurred in Bangui, including dancing, singing and honking horns in celebration. There were also cheers at a camp for 100,000 displaced Christian civilians at the airport. However, celebrations were marred by rampaging Christian militias, who destroyed mosques, attacked Muslim neighbourhoods and businesses; amid reports some of them engaged in the cannibalisation of a Muslim body in Bangui. Djotodia then left for Benin the next day where he was welcomed at Cadjehoun Airport by Benin's Foreign Minister Nassirou Bako Arifari: "Benin accepts to welcome him at the request of member states of the Economic Community of Central African States and it is our contribution to the search for peace in central Africa."

Nguendet pledged that the "anarchy" in the country would swiftly end and warned the warring factions from Séléka and the anti-balaka Christian fighters: "To the ex-Séléka, to the anti-balaka and the lovers of looting, I'm giving you a severe warning: The party is over. The chaos is over, the pillaging is over, the revenge attacks are over." Similarly, soldiers and police who had deserted amidst fears of being targeted returned to duty as 12 January was reported as "calm." Chief of Staff General Ferdinand Bomboyeke called on the troops to return to their barracks the next day. Colonel Desire Bakossa, who supervised the registration, said that the returnees "came in very large numbers and they're still coming. They answered the general's call. It's a relief. It's a very good sign." The same process was also initiated for returning police as Nguendet said that the police, who were absent from the streets of Bangui amidst the latest fighting, would be "redeployed within 72 hours and would take part in the disarmament process. On 12 January, reconciliation was reported in the southern Bangui neighbourhood of Bimbo with rival fighters striking a truce and embracing each other. Nguendet also went to the airport, where about 100,000 people were sheltering, to urge them to return home. UN Special Representative Babacar Gaye said that Nguendet's profile could "help restore hope" and that the international community would have to help on the road "to free, credible and democratic elections." Yet the United Nations Office for the Coordination of Humanitarian Affairs' John Ging said the country was in a "mega-crisis" and warned about the "wanton destruction" as posing a disaster warning. Foreigners continued to be repatriated by mid-month with 300 Malians returning on 9 January and over 1,000 people expected to return. He said that a large international effort was needed to restore stability. French Defence Minister Jean-Yves Le Drian said a new leadership should be announced "as soon as possible" as "the aim is to move forward with elections before the end of the year. We need the National Transitional Council to find a provisional alternative." Foreign Ministry Spokesman Romain Nadal added: "We take note of the resignation. It is up to the CNT to decide what happens now. France does not interfere in any case with this process."

== Humanitarian consequences ==
By the middle of December, 159,000 people were internally displaced persons seeking refuge from the sectarian nature of the conflict in Bangui. Only a few of the 800,000 city's residents were still present while others had sought protection near a French military base and other areas. The airport vicinity housed about 40,000 people. Other aid workers also cited a looming humanitarian crisis with over 500,000 people displaced across the country since the fighting began. Many people are staying by the Bangui M'Poko International Airport. Aid agencies reported being under-equipped to deal with the humanitarian consequences, while the instability was worsening the situation. Up to 100,000 people were living in camps in the country.

The International Organization for Migration (IOM) had started to airlift foreigners on 11 January 2014. On one of three charter flights over the weekend, 800 Chadians from a refugee camp near Bangui were repatriated. IOM Director Carmela Godeau issued a statement that read: "Several concerned governments including Mali, Senegal, Niger and Chad have already organised evacuation flights, but need additional resources to cope with all the migrants wanting to leave the CAR and those arriving home, who are often destitute. The evacuation of these migrants must be done quickly and in an orderly manner to avoid people trying to leave on their own overland and taking terrible risks, in desperation."

== Potential repercussions ==
The Lord's Resistance Army, which is facing declining numbers and deaths of leaders in its home base of Uganda, has been attempting to cross into the country. The instability and lawlessness in CAR may provide the LRA an opportunity to re-group and re-organise.

== Reactions ==
Domestic

In the second weekend of December, following the death of 400 people in the country, President Michel Djotodia said: "It is too much to say I have no control. I control my men. The men I can't control are not my men." On 25 December, Djotodia called for an end to the "massacres" and said: "Love one another! We find that in the Bible and the Koran", as he was surrounded by local Christian and Muslim religious leaders. He also announced a ban on all illegal demonstrations in Bangui and accused Bozizé and his supporters of being behind the violence which "massacres innocent Central Africans." He had earlier stated that even though he was a Muslim, he accepted that the CAR was a secular state and warned that ill-intentioned people wanted to start inter-religious conflict.

International

In November 2013, the UN warned the country was at risk of spiralling into genocide, was "descending into complete chaos" and France described the country as "...on the verge of genocide." The UNSC passed resolution 2122 ordering the deployment of MISCA for peacekeeping operations. France then sent additional troops to the few hundred already stationed there, bringing their total number of troops in the country to over 1,000. The UK also had support operations. Similarly, the U.S. Defence Secretary Chuck Hagel ordered Africom to coordinate with France in sending its military aircraft to airlift Burundian troops to the country upon the former's urging for support. Following violence in the second weekend of December that killed over 400 people, U.S. President Barack Obama spoke to the "proud citizens of the Central African Republic" and said they have the power "to choose a different path" than the violence that took place. On a trip to Africa for the death and state funeral of Nelson Mandela, French President Francois Hollande then arrived in the country on 10 December, the day after the death of two French soldiers from the 8th Marine Infantry Parachute Regiment. Accompanied by Foreign Minister Laurent Fabius, he claimed that the intervention was "necessary if one wants to avoid carnage here" and that instead it "was time to act. It was soon going to be too late. [The clashes were] taking on a religious dimension with the risk of leading to a civil war. For weeks, massacres were conducted and horrendous violence was done to women and children. France is not here in the CAR out of any self-interest. France has come to defend human dignity." Upon arriving in the country, their Defense Minister Jean-Yves Le Drian said there was a need to end the "spiral of atrocities and sectarian violence that is under way. One of your first tasks is to disarm the militias, while ensuring that civilian populations, Muslims as well as Christians, do not become targets of blind reprisals." Fabius said on 15 December, about the possibility of renewed violence after a lull following the UNSC resolution mandating an intervention body, that this "is a real, big problem. Tomorrow, I'll go to the Council of Foreign Ministers and I will ask [our European partners] for stepped-up, more robust aid, including on the ground." Various forms of support had already come from Poland, the United Kingdom, Germany, Spain and Belgium; however domestic French support for the mission fell after the death of two French soldiers despite continued advocacy by Hollande. Fabius later said that "we will soon have troops on the ground from our European colleagues." Unnamed diplomats were reported to have suggested Belgium and Poland could send forces who would then be used to relieve the French forces securing the airport.

In accordance with the UNSC resolution, the European Union imposed a ban on arms sales to the country in late December 2013. In early 2014, the EU's state leaders asked Catherine Ashton for options in deploying forces to the country. She suggested a rapid deployment of troops to protect the population and humanitarian facilities. With discussion on the proposal occurring on 10 January, an approval could see 700–1,000 troops sent to the country.

The commander of the Burundian battalion arriving in the country, Lieutenant-Colonel Potien Hakizimana, said that his 850 soldiers arrived in the country in mid-December aboard two U.S. military aircraft. The AU announced an increase of its 2,500 troops in the country to 6,000 on 13 December. Rwandan Foreign Minister Louise Mushikiwabo wrote on Twitter that "Rwanda was asked by the AU to contribute troops to the CAR and deploy urgently, and yes, right now the RDF is preparing to go," however she did not give a number as to how many soldiers would be sent, instead she said that they will leave "very soon" as of 20 December.

On 14 December, UN Secretary-General Ban Ki-moon warned: "Too many people are scared and the country is on the brink of ruin ... I appeal to everyone to follow the path of peace. The bloodshed must stop. I have a clear message to all who would commit atrocities and crimes against humanity. The world is watching. You will be held to account." The day before, UNICEF added that it had flown in tons of supplies, including blankets, jerry cans and medicine. UNHCR's Maurice Azonnankpo said: "We have noticed several cases of traumatised people, a few cases of survivors of gender-based violence, and also a few cases of separated children [from] their families. We have our teams at all the [internally displaced persons] sites where they are conducting distribution of non-food items... to respond to the needs of these IDPs in Bangui." Meanwhile, the director of the AU's Peace and Security department, El Ghassim Wane, said: "The decision by the Peace and Security Council (PSC) is to authorise us to increase the force. We can go up to 6,000, depending on the needs." Moon later claimed that "the entire population of 4.6 million people is affected. And half of them are children." He added that 2013 was the year CAR descended into chaos and that a commission of inquiry was needed to look into reports of atrocities. An UNHCR spokesman said that 210,000 people were displaced.

By the first week of 2014, the UN political affairs chief Jeffrey Feltman told the UNSC that about 2.2 million people throughout the CAR need assistance. Further, about 513,000 people, or half the population, of Bangui had left their homes and about 100,000 people sought shelter at a camp at the airport. The EU was reportedly considering sending 1,000 troops to support the French forces in the country.

Media

Deutsche Welle drew parallels to other Central African conflicts, in particular that of the Democratic Republic of Congo whose border could be used for further destabilization in the CAR. It also raised the issue of how the conflict in South Sudan has the potential of further destabilizing the region, and stated that the peacekeepers were poorly equipped to deal with these conflicts. Yet it added that MISCA and MONUSCO are important in stopping a "conflagration in Central Africa and in guaranteeing lasting peace."

== Aftermath and continued violence ==
Despite the resignation of Djotodia, conflict still continued.

== See also ==
- Operation Serval (2012–present), as part of Northern Mali conflict
