= Herbert Gontran Djono Ahaba =

Central African politician (born 1974)

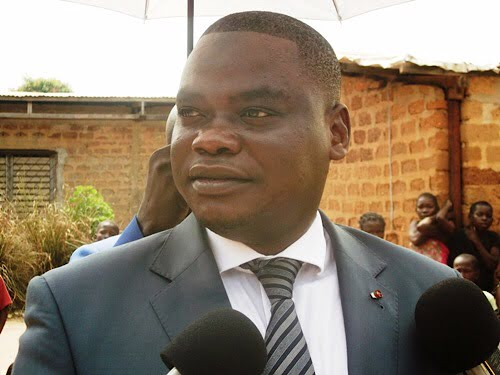
- Ahaba in 2023

Minister of Transport and Civil Aviation
- Incumbent
- Assumed office 24 June 2021
- President: Faustin-Archange Touadéra
- Prime Minister: Henri-Marie Dondra; Félix Moloua
- Preceded by: Arnaud Djoubaye Abazène

Minister of Energy Development and Hydraulic Resources
- In office 12 September 2017 – 10 June 2021
- President: Faustin-Archange Touadéra
- Prime Minister: Simplice Sarandji; Firmin Ngrébada
- Preceded by: Léopold Mboli Fatrane
- Succeeded by: Arthur Bertrand Piri

Minister of State in charge of Public Works, Town Planning, Housing and Public Buildings
- In office 27 January 2014 – 22 August 2014
- President: Catherine Samba-Panza
- Prime Minister: André Nzapayeké
- Preceded by: Jérémie Tchimanguere (housing); Rizigala Ramadane (town planning); Crépin Mboli-Goumba (public works)
- Succeeded by: Gilbert Kongrengbo (housing); Jacques Ndémanga (town planning and public buildings); Marie-Noëlle Koyara (public works)

Minister of State for Mines, Petroleum, Energy and Hydraulics
- In office 31 March 2013 – 27 January 2014
- President: Michel Djotodia
- Prime Minister: Nicolas Tiangaye
- Preceded by: Himself (Geology, Mining Research and Hydraulics)
- Succeeded by: Olivier Malibangar

Minister of Geology, Mining Research and Hydraulics
- In office 13 February 2013 – 31 March 2013
- President: François Bozizé; Michel Djotodia
- Prime Minister: Nicolas Tiangaye
- Preceded by: Léopold Mboli Fatran (Energy and Hydraulics); Obed Namsio (Mines)
- Succeeded by: Himself (Mines, Petroleum, Energy and Hydraulics)

Minister of Housing and Accommodation
- In office 22 April 2011 – 23 May 2011
- President: François Bozizé
- Prime Minister: Faustin-Archange Touadéra
- Preceded by: Djollo-Djidou
- Succeeded by: Joseph Kalite

Personal details
- Born: 7 February 1974 Birao, Central African Republic
- Party: RPRC
- Education: University of Bangui
- Occupation: Politician

Herbert Gontran Djono Ahaba (born 7 February 1974) is a Central African politician from Vakaga Prefecture who is currently serving as a minister of transport and civil aviation.

== Early life and education ==
Djono was born on 7 February 1974 in Birao. His father, Djouma Abdassid, was a Water and Forestry Service officer. He finished his elementary education in 1983 and continued his studies at Collège d’Enseignement Général in Birao, graduating in 1990. One year later, he enrolled at Lycée de Gobongo and graduated in 1996. Afterward, he continued his higher education at the University of Bangui and finished in 2000. He then took Financial Management Administration postgraduate education at Ecole Nationale d’Administration et Magistrature in Yaounde from 2000 to 2003.

== Career ==
Djono began his career in civil service as a tax inspector in 2004. Later, he served in various positions in the Ministry of Finance and Budget. He was elected as a member of National Assembly representing Birao 2 District in 2011. In the same year, Touadera appointed Abaha as minister of housing and accommodation from April to May 2011. On 6 January 2012, he was arrested together with Jean-Jacques Demafouth, Mahamat Abrass, and Abdel Kader Kalil with the accusation of conspiring against national security and Djono later was released on 11 April.

Tiangaye appointed Djono as minister of Geology, Mining Research, and Hydraulics in February 2013. Then, he was appointed minister of state for mines, petroleum, energy, and hydraulics on 31 March 2013. He held this position until January 2014. During his tenure as minister of mines, he attempted to lift the CAR's suspension from the Kimberley Process and signed decrees of gold & diamond mining concessions unbeknownst to the prime minister and directors of the mining administration. The latter was done to avoid scrutiny.

Under the Nzapayeké cabinet, he became the minister of State in charge of public works, town planning, housing, and public buildings until August 2014. Afterward, he moved to France. In September 2017, Sarandji placed Djono as minister of energy development and hydraulic resources until June 2021. When he served in this ministerial position, he rehabilitated 15 pumps in Bangui to solve the water crisis issue, in which the government was responsible for two pump rehabilitations whereas World Bank rehabilitated the rest under the Passel Project. Meanwhile, he also got involved in DDR operation. From June 2021 to the present, he is the minister of Transport and Civil Aviation. As a minister of transport and civil aviation, he created the administration for the transitional management for Société Centrafricaine des Transports Fluviaux (SOCATRAF) to assess the company's current condition and evaluate the SOCATRAF asset.

In 2023, Djono Ahaba was awarded as the best Central African minister by a Cameroon organization. However, the award received criticism and laughing stock due to his lack of achievement as a transport minister.

=== RPRC ===
Djono also became the founder of RPRC in November 2014 and served as the political leader. As a leader of RPRC, he signed the DDRR Agreement at the Bangui Forum on 10 May 2015, played a vital role in demanding the resignation of Firmin Ngrébada, and represented the party in the Khartoum Talks. Nevertheless, he was later reappointed as Minister of Energy Development and Hydraulic Resources on 22 March 2019.

== Personal life ==
A Muslim, Djono is a nephew of Michel Djotodia and belongs to Gula. He is married and has six children.

== Bibliography ==
- Weyns, Yannick; Hoex, Lotte; Hilgert, Filip; Spittaels, Steven (November 2014). Mapping Conflict Motives: The Central African Republic (PDF) (Report).
