= Gisèle Bedan =

Central African politician

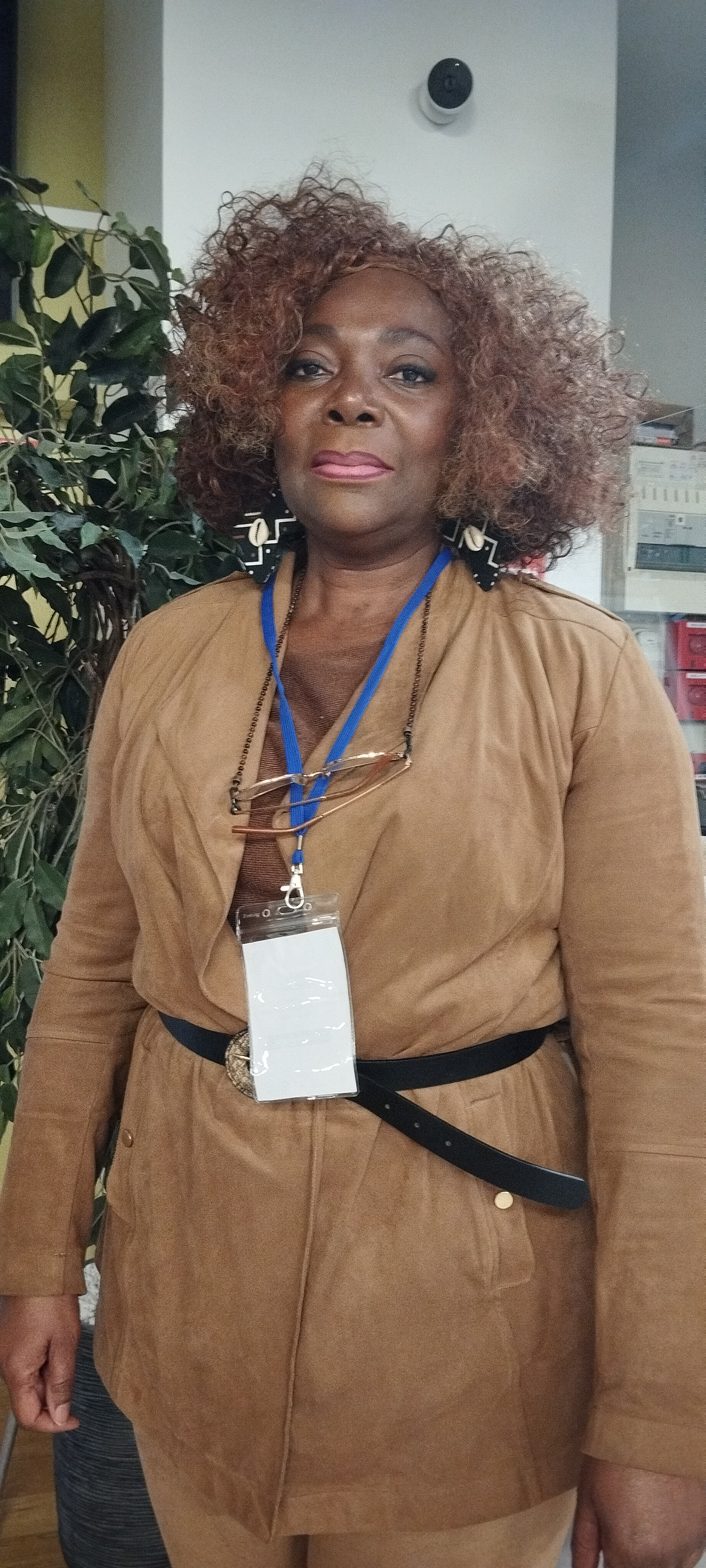
- Gisèle Bedan

Minister of National Education, Higher Education and Scientific Research
- In office 27 January 2014 – 16 January 2015
- President: Catherine Samba-Panza
- Prime Minister: André Nzapayeké; Mahamat Kamoun
- Preceded by: Rainaldy Sioke
- Succeeded by: Éloi Anguimaté

Personal details
- Born: 1966 (age 59–60) Bangui, Central African Republic
- Profession: Educationalist

Gisèle Bedan (born Bangui, 1966) is a politician from the Central African Republic. She was Minister of National Education, Higher Education and Scientific Research from 2014 to 2015, serving in two governments.

== Biography ==
Bedan was born in 1966 in Bangui. Her father worked as a diplomat and her mother was a teacher.

In 1996, Bedan founded a 'low cost' school for young people in Bangui, which she managed until 2012. She worked in education in France in 2013 at the Rostand High School, Paris. She is founding member of the League for Education, Science and Culture in Africa (LESCA).

== Political career ==
Bedan was appointed to the post of Minister for Education on 27 January 2014, to serve in government under Prime Minister Andre Nzapayeké. She was appointed by the President Catherine Samba-Panza. During her tenure she worked with UNESCO to build a new cultural centre for young people in the 4th District of Bangui, laying the foundation stone with Director-General Irina Bokova. She applied for $15.5million of funding to support education in the Central African Republic. In 2014 she attended the Global Summit for Women. She was also part of the governmental team who secured 5 million Euros for vocational training. She has spoken out about the necessity of education, particularly in unstable countries.

Bedan was also involved in diplomatic activity as a minister, including leading discussions about discrimination against peace-keeping soldiers from Chad. This is involved tackling violence against foreign NGOs.

Bedan's role as Minister was initially renewed by Mahamat Kamoun, but on 16 January 2015, when Kamoun formed his second government it was reneged. Bedan claims she was forced to resign due to death threats. The Ministry of Education is claimed to be 'unmanageable' due to corruption.
