= Touadéra (surname) =

Touadéra is a surname. Notable people with the surname include:

- Brigitte Touadéra, Central African auditor, consultant, and one of the two wives of President
- Faustin-Archange Touadéra (born 1957), Central African politician and mathematician who has been President of the Central African Republic
- Tina Touadéra, Central African public figure and one of the two wives of President
