= Central African Republic Council of Ministers =

The Central African Republic Council of Ministers consists of 31 members appointed by the president.

The Council of Ministers is chaired by the president and is tasked with managing government operations and initiating laws.

The information below reflects the composition of the Council as of 11 February 2022.

== Members of the Council of Ministers ==
Office	Name	Term
President	Faustin-Archange Touadéra	2016–incumbent
Prime Minister	Félix Moloua	2022–incumbent
Ministers of State
Minister of State of Economy, Planning, and International Cooperation	Richard Filakota	2019–
Minister of Justice, Legal Reforms, Human Rights, and Keeper of the Seals	Arnaud Djoubane-Abazène	2022–
Minister of State in charge of Disarmament, Demobilization, Reintegration, Repatriation and Monitoring of the Political Agreement for Peace and Reconciliation	Jean Willybiro-Sako	2022–
Ministers
Minister of National Defense, Veterans, War Victims, and Restructuring of the Army	Claude Rameaux Bireau	2022–
Minister of State of Mines & Geology	Rufin Benam-Beltoungou	2022–
Minister in charge of Transport & Civil Aviation	Gontran Ndjono-Ahaba	2022–
Minister of Civil Service and Administrative Reform	Marcel Djimassé	2022–
Minister of Communication & Media, Government Spokesperson	Serge Ghislain Djorie	2022–
Minister in charge of Higher Education, Scientific Research and Technological Innovation	Jean Laurent Magalé	2022–
Minister of Humanitarian Action and National Solidarity	Josiane Lima Bemaka-Souï	2024–
Minister in charge of Gender Promotion, Protection of Women, Family and Children	Marthe Kirimat	2024–
Minister of Finance and Budget	Hervé Ndoba	2022–
Minister of Foreign Affairs, Regional Integration, and Francophone Affairs	Sylvie Baïpo-Temon	2018–
Minister in charge of the General Secretariat of the Government and Relations with Parliament	Maxime Balalou	2022–
Minister in charge of Equipment and Public Works	Guismala-Amza	2022–
Minister of the Interior and Public Security	Michel Nicaise Nassin	2022–
Minister of Posts and Telecommunications in charge of New Technologies	Justin Gourna-Zacko	2022–
Minister of Public Health and Population	Pierre Somsé	2022–
Minister of Arts, Culture & Tourism	Françoise Martha Ngola Ramadan	2024–
Minister of Trade & Industry	Patrick Thierry Akoloza	2022–
Minister of Livestock & Animal Health	Hassan Bouba	2020–
Minister in charge of Territorial Administration, Decentralization and Local Development	Bruno Yapandé	2022–
Minister of Youth, Sports and Civic Education	Héritier Doneng	2024–
Minister in charge of Agriculture & Rural Development	Eric Rekosse-Kamot	2022–
Minister in charge of Sustainable Energy Development and Hydraulic Resources	Arthur Bertrand Piri	2022–
Minister in charge of Small and Medium Enterprises and Promotion of the Private Sector	Hyppolite Ngatte	2022–
Minister in charge of Town Planning, Land Reform, Cities and Housing	Nicele Nkoué	2022–
Minister in charge of Labour, Employment, Social Protection and Vocational Training	Michelle Mwanga	2022–
Minister in charge of the Environment and Sustainable Development	Thierry Kamach	2022–
Minister in charge of Water, Forests, Hunting and Fishing	Gervais Mbata	2024–
Minister in charge of National Education	Simplice Aurélien Zingas	2024–
Minister in charge of Development and Strategic Investment	Pascal Bida Koyagbele	2019–
Ministers-Delegate
Minister Delegate to the Minister of State in charge of Disarmament, Demobilization, Reintegration, Repatriation, in charge of Monitoring the Political Agreement for Peace and National Reconciliation	Gilbert Tomou Deya	2019–
