= Education in the Central African Republic =

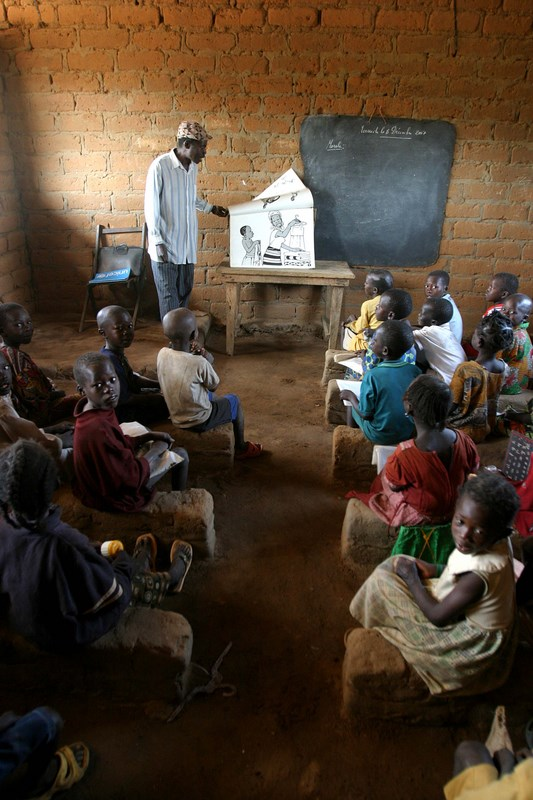
Classroom in Sam Ouandja, Central African Republic

Public education in the Central African Republic is free, and education is compulsory from ages 6 to 14. AIDS-related deaths have taken a heavy toll on teachers, contributing to the closure of more than 100 primary schools between 1996 and 1998.

In 1991, the gross primary enrollment rate was 56.9 percent. In 2000, the net primary enrollment rate for children between the ages of 6 and 11 was 43 percent. Primary school attendance rates were unavailable for the Central African Republic as of 2001. While enrollment rates indicate a level of commitment to education, they do not always reflect children’s participation in school.

There is not equal access to primary school for girls. For the first year of school, 65% of girls are enrolled in primary school. This dropped to 23% of girls after six years of primary school in 2007. Many girls drop out of school in their early teens due to societal pressures to marry and have children.

The educational system’s meager budget and salary arrears have resulted in a shortage of teachers and an increase in the number of street children. The percentage of the national budget allocated to education, which traditionally stood at less than 12 percent, increased to 18 percent in the late 1990s. According to the government, it will further increase to 25 percent by 2010.

There were 800,000 students that were affected by the violence that broke out in December 2012 due to the Séléka rebels. Many teachers who sought refuge in others areas had yet to return to the country.

Corruption is an issue in the government of many countries, including the Central African Republic: former Minister for Education Gisèle Bedan claimed that it was an impossible department to run.

As of 2018, the literacy rate for men between the ages of 15-24 is 72.3 percent and 59.1 percent for women of the same age group.

The Human Rights Measurement Initiative (HRMI) finds that the Central African Republic is fulfilling only 59.6% of what it should be fulfilling for the right to education based on the country's level of income. HRMI breaks down the right to education by looking at the rights to both primary education and secondary education. While taking into consideration the Central African Republic's income level, the nation is achieving 70.8% of what should be possible based on its resources (income) for primary education but only 48.3% for secondary education.

== Institutions ==
Universities

- University of Bangui

Primary and secondary schools

- Lycée Français Charles de Gaulle
