= Ambroisine Kpongo =

Central African Republic diplomat

Permanent Representative of the Central African Republic to the United Nations
- In office September 2014 – 28 June 2024
- Succeeded by: Marius Aristide Hoja Nzessioué

Personal details
- Born: 11 November 1951 (age 74) Central African Republic
- Education: Free University of Brussels
- Occupation: Diplomat
- Profession: Political scientist

Ambroisine Kpongo (born 11 November 1951) is a Central African Republic diplomat who served as the country's Permanent Representative to the United Nations from 2014 until 2024.

== Early life and education ==
Kpongo was born on 11 November 1951. She has a diploma in political science and international relations from the Free University of Brussels in Belgium.

== Career ==
Kpongo was Director of International Organizations at the Ministry of Foreign Affairs from 1991 until 1996, before becoming First Counsellor to the Permanent Mission of the Central African Republic to the UN in New York City in 1996.

Kpongo was appointed General Director for Political Affairs by General François Bozizé in 2003, and was Delegate Minister of Foreign Affairs from January 2009 until April 2011.

Kpongo was appointed Central African Republic's Permanent Representative to the UN by President Catherine Samba-Panza in September 2014. She was succeeded by Marius Aristide Hoja Nzessioué on 28 June 2024.
