= Joseph Kalite =

Central African politician and doctor

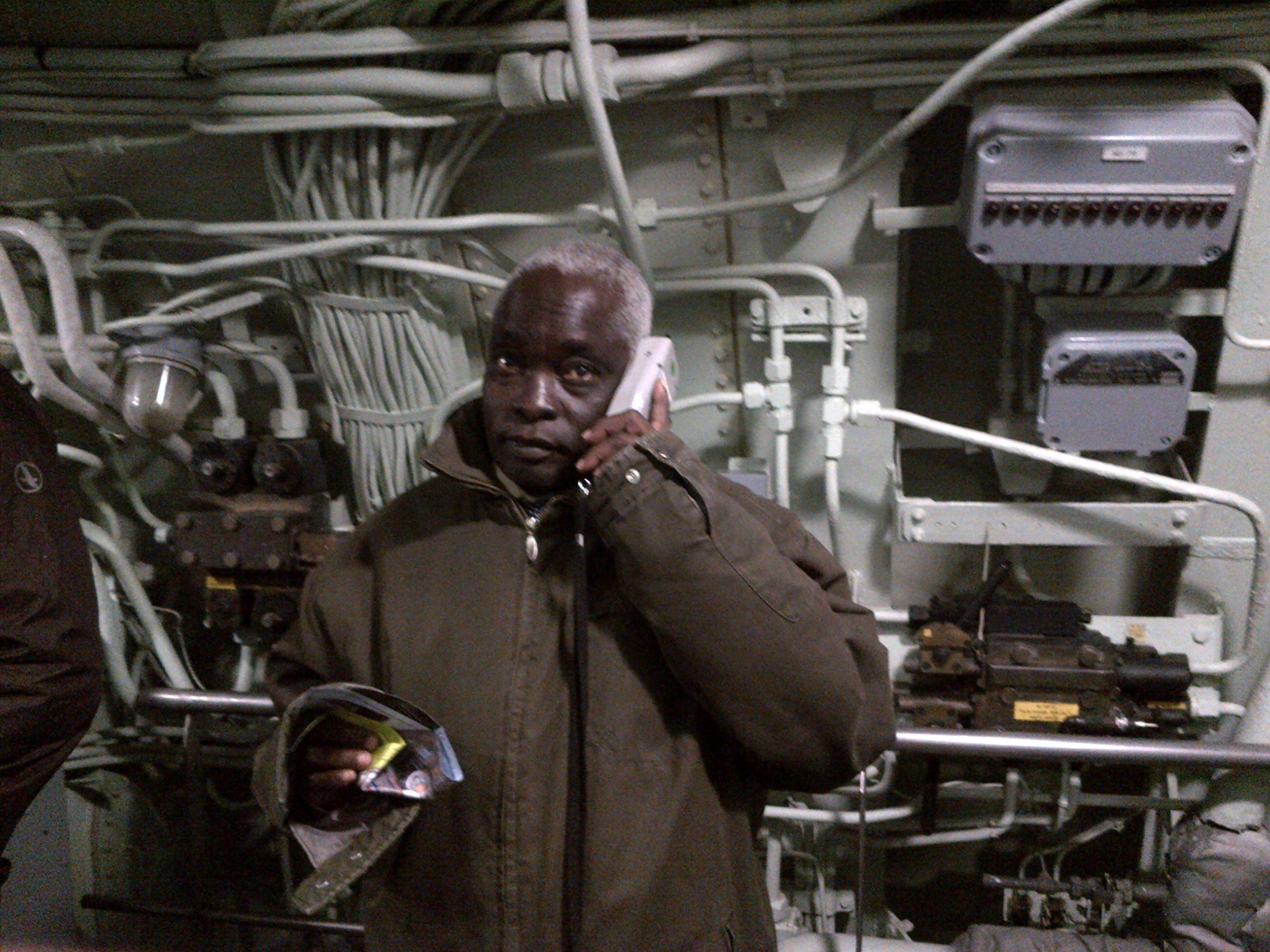

Minister of Housing and Accommodation
- In office 2011–2012
- President: François Bozizé
- Prime Minister: Faustin-Archange Touadéra
- Preceded by: Herbert Gontran Djono Ahaba

Minister of Public Health and Population
- In office 5 April 2001 – 31 March 2003
- President: Ange-Félix Patassé
- Prime Minister: Martin Ziguélé
- Preceded by: Richard Lakoue
- Succeeded by: Nestor Mamadou Nali

Minister of Agriculture and Livestock
- In office 1999–2001
- President: Ange-Félix Patassé
- Preceded by: Charles Massi

Personal details
- Died: 24 January 2014 Bangui, Central African Republic
- Party: Kwa Na Kwa
- Occupation: Doctor

Joseph Kalite (died 24 January 2014) was a Central African politician and doctor. As a government minister he either held the housing or health portfolio. Kalite, a Muslim, was reported to be killed by anti-balaka outside the Central Mosque in the capital Bangui during the Central African Republic conflict. He was killed with machetes on the day in Bangui after interim president Catherine Samba-Panza took power. At the time of the attack Kalite held no government position, nor did he under the Séléka rule. He was reported to have supported the rule of Séléka leader Michel Djotodia.

== Life ==
Kalite is from Birao.

== Career ==
=== Angel-Félix Patassé Presidency ===
In 1999, Patassé appointed Kalite as a minister of Agriculture and Livestock. He held this ministerial position until 2001. Subsequently, Patassé designated Kalite as a minister of Health Public Health and Population from 2001-2003.

During his two-year tenure as a public health minister, UN began a triple HIV/AIDS therapy program on 4 September 2002 and he laid the construction HIV/AIDS treatment and research center in Bangui in 2003. Moreover, Japan gave aid of US $4,163,079 to Central Africa Republic for the health sector.

=== François Bozizé Presidency ===
During the early year of the Bozize government, he was placed under house arrest on 26 July 2004. However, Bozize released him and appointed Kalite as his economic advisor on 7 July 2005. Later on, Kalite joined Kwa Na Kwa. In 2011, he was elected as a member of Assemblée nationale, representing Birao's second district.

Bozize appointed Kalite as minister of housing and accommodation in 2011, replacing Herbert Gotran Djono Ahaba. As a housing minister, he initiated the creation of the Central African Housing Bank agency to improve housing in the Central African Republic. On 28 December 2012, he was arrested on the accusation of aiding Seleka rebel groups.

== Death ==
On 24 January 2014, the suspected Anti-Balaka militia asked Kalite to get out of the taxi. They attacked Kalite with machetes and sticks and he succumbed to death. Nevertheless, Anti-Balaka denied the involvement in Kalite's assassination.

== Personal life ==
He belongs to the Goula tribe and is a Muslim.
