= Manou =

Manou may refer to:

- Manu (Hinduism), the Hindu progenitor of humanity
- Manou, Central African Republic, a village in Vakaga Prefecture in Central African Republic
- Manou, Eure-et-Loir, a commune in the Eure-et-Loir department in France
- Graham Manou, Australian cricketer
- Manou, a member of the German pop group beFour
