= Cyriaque Samba-Panza =

Central African politician, public official and diplomat

First Gentleman of the Central African Republic
- In office 23 January 2014 – 30 March 2016
- Preceded by: Chantal Djotodia
- Succeeded by: Brigitte Touadéra; Tina Touadéra

Personal details
- Spouse: Catherine Samba-Panza (m. 1998)

Cyriaque Samba-Panza is a Central African politician, public official, and diplomat. Samba-Panza has held several ministerial and diplomatic positions throughout his career, particularly under former presidents André Kolingba and François Bozizé. Jeune Afrique has described him as a "well-known political figure" within the country. Samba-Panza, the husband of former President Catherine Samba-Panza, also served as the inaugural First Gentleman of the Central African Republic during her presidency from 2014 to 2016.

== Biography ==
Samba-Panza had close ties with a number of public officials, notably former Central African Prime Ministers Jean-Pierre Lebouder and Enoch Derant Lakoué. He also served as a government minister several times, especially within the governments of André Kolingba and François Bozizé. In 1987, Samba-Panza was appointed Secretary of State for Planning, Statistics and International Cooperation. He also served as chief of staff for Prime Minister Enoch Derant Lakoué from February 1993 to October 1993. He was deputy minister for economic planning under President André Kolingba and Minister of Procurement under President François Bozizé until his ouster during the Central African Republic Civil War. Additionally, Cyriaque Samba-Panza held the position of Vice President of the Social Democratic Party (PSD).

In 1998, he married Catherine Samba-Panza, who later became President of the Central African Republic in 2014. He held the position of the first First Gentleman in the country's history from 2014 until 2016.

Cyriaque Samba-Panza is retired from politics, as of 2023.
