= Xavier Sylvestre Yangongo =

Central African general and politician (1946–2024)

Minister of Disarmament, Demobilization, Reintegration of Veterans and National Pioneer Youth
- In office 22 April 2011 – 3 February 2013
- President: François Bozizé
- Prime Minister: Faustin-Archange Touadéra
- Succeeded by: Antoine Gambi

Minister of Disarmament
- In office 30 August 2001 – 16 January 2003
- President: Ange-Félix Patassé
- Prime Minister: Martin Ziguélé
- Preceded by: Michel Doyéné

Minister of Public Health and Social Affairs
- In office 1984–?
- President: Andre Kolingba

Minister of Justice
- In office 4 March 1982 – 1984
- President: Andre Kolingba
- Preceded by: Alphonse Mbaikoua
- Succeeded by: Gaspard Kalene

Minister of Civil Service, Labor, and Social Security
- In office 1 September 1981 – 4 March 1982
- President: Andre Kolingba
- Succeeded by
Prefectural posts
Prefect of Lobaye
In office 1989–?
Succeeded by

Personal details
- Born: 31 December 1946 Brazzaville, French Congo
- Died: 24 May 2024 (aged 77) Bangui, Central African Republic
- Occupation: Soldier; Politician

Military service
- Allegiance: Central African Republic
- Branch/service: FACA
- Years of service: 1964 – ?
- Rank: General

General Xavier Sylvestre Yangongo (31 December 1946 – 24 May 2024) was a Central African general and politician who served in various ministerial positions during Kolingba's, Patasse's, and Bozize's presidencies.

== Early life and education ==
Yangongo was born in Brazzaville on 31 December 1946. His father, Norbert Yangongo (1908–1982), was a policeman, while his mother, Agathe Sawala Mounguiakoua, worked as a seamstress. He enrolled at École Saint-Vincent in 1954 and then at Petite Ecole de Foie in 1955. Subsequently, he studied at Collège Charminade from 1961 to 1963 and later at Military Preparatory College in Brazzaville.

== Career ==
=== Military ===
Yangongo joined the 1st Infantry Battalion of FACA on 1 October 1964 for six months. Afterward, he was promoted to 1st Class Soldier in 1965. After various promotions within the army, he became lieutenant on 10 February 1975. He served as the director of École spéciale de formation des officiers d’active (ESFOA) in Bouar and Government Commissioner at the Permanent Military Court on 10 October 1975. While serving as the director, his rank was upgraded to captain on 26 December.

In February 1976, Yangongo was assigned to prosecute Fidèle Obrou. Subsequently, he was sent to Camp Kassaï and worked as Deputy Commander on 25 February 1976 and then became the camp's commander on 29 November 1976. While he worked at Camp Kassaï, his rank was elevated to Major (13 December 1976), lieutenant colonel (26 August 1977), and colonel (8 December 1977).

Upon the fall of the Bokassa regime, Dacko promoted Yangongo's rank to brigadier general and named him as the army deputy chief of staff on 24 July 1981 and later deputy minister of defense. Furthermore, he also served as the Commander of the Air Force and Commander of the Bangui M'Poko Military Air Base on 1 October 1980. During Patasse's presidency, Yangongo's rank was elevated to major general and he was designated as inspector of FACA.

=== Political ===
During Kolingba's administration, Yangongo was assigned to various ministerial positions such as civil service, labor, social security minister, justice minister, and public health and social affairs minister. Apart from that, he also served as the Prefect of Lobaye in 1989. However, Kolingba arrested and jailed Yangongo for criticizing Kolingba's associates over the murder of Bernard Kowada in 1990. Due to his arrest, he left the army and was jobless from 1991 to 1992. In 1992, he was assigned as director of ENERCA.

Under Patasse's administration, Yangongo was appointed the Minister of Disarmament from 30 April 2001 to 15 January 2003. Subsequently, he was appointed Patasse's advisor. After the successful 2003 Central African Republic coup d'état, he participated in the National Dialogue from September to October 2003 and became the chairman of the National Security and Defense Commission. In the National Dialogue, he ordered 350 people to forgive the army's actions to the country.

In 2007, Bozize designated Yangongo as the chairman of the high commissioner of National Pioneer Youth. He then served as the Minister of Disarmament, Demobilization, Reintegration of Veterans and National Pioneer Youth on 22 April 2011. Under his tenure, Yangongo negotiated and signed a ceasefire agreement with CPJP in 2012 and resumed the DDR operation.

In 2014, Yangongo stood as an interim presidential candidate. He announced his presidential candidacy for the 2015–16 Central African general election on 20 April 2014. In the election, he received 6868 votes and did not advance to the second round.

== Death ==
Yangongo died in Bangui on 24 May 2024 due to illness. The official funeral was held on 18 June 2024 and Faustin-Archange Touadéra attended it. Afterward, the body was handed over to Yangongo's family for burial on 19 June in Bobangui.

== Personal life ==
Yangongo was a nephew of Barthélémy Boganda. He was married and had eight children.

== Bibliography ==
- Bradshaw, Richard; Rius, Juan Fandos (2016). Historical Dictionary of the Central African Republic (Historical Dictionaries of Africa). Lanham: Rowman & Littlefield.
