= MISCA =

African Union CAR peacekeeping mission

Coordinates: 4°22′N 18°35′E

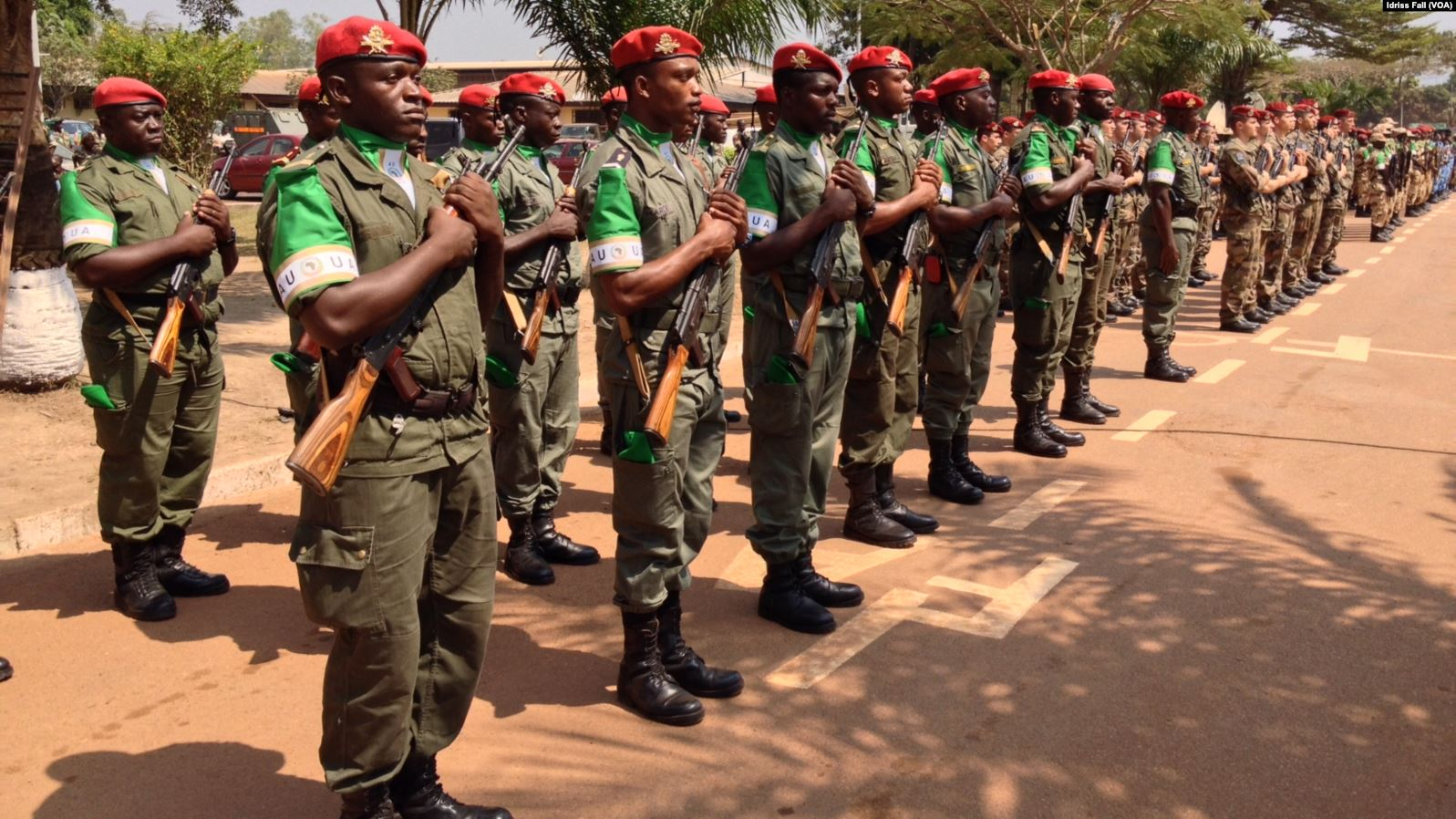
MISCA troops at the mission's launch ceremony in Bangui, 19 December 2013

The African-led International Support Mission to the Central African Republic (French: Mission internationale de soutien à la Centrafrique sous conduite africaine, MISCA) was an African Union peacekeeping mission to the Central African Republic. It was established on 5 December 2013 by United Nations Security Council resolution 2127 to stabilise the country as a result of the Central African Republic conflict under the Djotodia administration and following the 2013 Central African Republic coup d'état.

The mission was deployed on 19 December 2013 and it was officially backed by France and initially led by the African Union. The resolution included the option to transfer it to a larger mission under the authority of the United Nations, with peacekeeping forces from more countries – if needed and if appropriate local conditions were met.

On 10 April 2014, the Security Council authorized the deployment of a multidimensional United Nations peacekeeping operation in the Central African Republic (MINUSCA). As a consequence of the deployment, the African-led International Support Mission in the Central African Republic (MISCA) transferred its authority over to MINUSCA, in accordance with resolution 2149 (2014).

== Overview ==
The creation of MISCA was a consequence of the United Nations Security Council resolution on 10 October 2013, expressing its concerns for stabilizing the political transition of the new regime following the Agreements of Libreville on 11 January 2013 and the declaration of N'Djamena on 18 April 2013, calling for the organization of free elections in CAR, and for the responsibility of the new leaders of the country to stop the violence. The resolution urged the United Nations Integrated Peacebuilding Office in the Central African Republic (BINUCA) to report about the effective status for all its efforts accomplished after nearly one year of its mandated presence in the country in severe troubles, in order to have its government and opponents supporting a peaceful transition and protecting the population, and to coordinate the international efforts for this goal.

This interim resolution was deemed insufficient, and the United Nations with the BINUCA could not reach the expected warranties from the new CAR leaders and opponent armed groups (and notably the security, indirectly supported from Uganda and South Sudan) and the Séléka militias and various smaller armed religious activist groups or gangs, or exactions committed by them or their supporters against humanitarian NGOs' facilities in the country or against the civil populations and camps of refugees, such as massive murders, rapes of women, or the forced conscription of children in armed troops, and many civilians wounded by machetes or knives within dozens of hospitals in the Bangui capital region, as reported by the head of Doctors without Borders in the country).

Since the beginning of the BINUCA mission, the traffic of firearms, the violence and destruction of public or private assets never stopped, but increased in a deadly spiral causing much more political turmoil, numerous victims and destruction, as well as massive migrations of refugees within the CAR itself as well as in neighbouring countries, where they are still endangered by spreading violence and by lack of protection and assistance. The BINUCA and NGO's operating in the region estimate that already about 15% of the Central African population (millions people when counting those in bordering countries, i.e. more than the whole population of either Haiti, Rwanda, Somalia or of regions affected by the conflict in Darfur) is directly exposed to these turmoils which will rapidly evolve to a severe humanitarian crisis affecting several African countries.

The resolution 2121 also suggested increasing the international peacekeeping forces, for which the UN called all African countries to participate, notably those participating with the African Union (AU) or with the Economic Community of Central African States (ECCAS or CEEAC) in their Mission for the Consolidation of Peace in Central African Republic (MICOPAX) cooperation mission, in order to transfer it to a newer, strengthened and better integrated MISCA peacekeeping force. Based on the alarming BINUCA report on the local situation (that the UN Security Council also requested in its resolution 2121), the Security Council had to make a new decision rapidly.

On 5 December 2013, the UNSC unanimously passed resolution 2127 which called for support of the Libreville agreement that initiated a temporary ceasefire in the country. It also called for Séléka and other armed groups to lay down their arms, called for Disarmament, Demobilization and Reintegration (DDR), or Disarmament, Demobilization, Repatriation, Reintegration and Resettlement (DDRRR), and looked forward to the immediate deployment of MISCA to be supported by the African Union (which will still lead the new integrated mission). This replaces the existing mission from the African Union and the FOMAC operation from the Economic Community of Central African States (ECCAS), as well as their Mission for the Consolidation of Peace in Central African Republic (MICOPAX), which are all working with the United Nations to ensure peace and unity in the country

== Contributing soldiers ==
The AU's Multinational Force of Central Africa (FOMAC), which will transfer to MISCA, comprises soldiers from Gabon, Chad, Congo-Brazzaville, and Cameroon. It will receive the support from France (already supporting the FOMAC), which will increase its presence in the CAR from 600 to 1200 troops in order to protect local French citizens, UN observers and the area of the Bangui M'Poko International Airport, and to provide assistance for the deployment and logistics of AU forces or international NGO workers, or for the possible evacuation of foreign residents in the country.

The resolution comes just in time before the international Élysée Summit for Peace and Security in Africa, starting the next day on December 6 and dominated by the situation in the Central African Republic, where most African leaders (including 40 country heads of state), the UN Secretary-General Ban Ki-moon and France will meet in Paris along with observers from other countries. France had already announced in the last weeks of November its intent to increase the deployment in the CAR to about 1,000 troops for a short mission of about 6 months to one year, in order to restore local order in the country; the resolution allows immediate deployment of French troops in the next few days.

At start of the two-day summit in Paris, French President François Hollande, at the funeral for former South African president and Nobel Peace Prize laureate Nelson Mandela, was horrified by the dramatic situation in Bangui, he announced that the French military presence in the CAR would double to include 1,200 troops, immediately, possibly within hours. And the African Union proposed increasing its forces participating in Central Africa to be boosted soon from about 2,000 to 3,500 troops within the MISCA mission which should last for at least one year according to mandate given by the UN resolution.

British Foreign Secretary William Hague stated that the British military will assist the deployment of French military equipment to the Central African Republic, with one of the first flights arriving "shortly" in Bangui. The United States made a similar promise to transport forces of the African Union using two C-17s.
