= Chantal Djotodia =

Central African-Beninese Politician

First Lady of the Central African Republic
- In office 24 March 2013 – 10 January 2014
- President: Michel Djotodia
- Preceded by: Monique Bozizé
- Succeeded by: Cyriaque Samba-Panza (as First Gentleman)

Personal details
- Born: Chantal Vinadou Tohouégnon; 27 August 1981 (age 44) Toffo, Benin
- Spouse: Michel Djotodia (m. 2012)
- Occupation: Nurse

Chantal Vinadou Tohouégnon Djotodia (born 27 August 1981) is a Beninese-born nurse who became the First Lady of the Central African Republic from 2013 to 2014.

== Early life and education ==
Chantal was born Vinadou Tohouégnon on 27 August 1981 in Toffo, Benin. Her father's name is Jean Tohouégno and her mother's name is Douhoun Houngnonsi. A few years after her birth, her parents divorced, and she was taken care of by her grandmother. She completed primary and secondary education. Afterward, she took training as a healthcare assistant and earned her diploma in 2007.

== Career ==
Upon receiving the diploma, Chantal worked as a nurse at a private clinic managed by an NGO named Barka. In 2008, she met Michel Djotodia and was impressed by his status as a political refugee, flattering skill, and multilingualism. Soon, she fell in love with Djotodia.

Nevertheless, Djotodia was arrested and imprisoned in Cotonou Prison since he was a Central African government fugitive. Hearing that Djotodia was in prison, Chantal contacted NGOs, human rights organizations, and the press to prevent him from being extracted to the Central African Republic. Due to her effort, Djotodia was freed in 2010 after 18 months of imprisonment.

After the release, the couple struggled to pay rent. Consequently, they were often evicted from rental houses due to their inability to pay the rent. In 2011, Djotodia temporarily left Chantal to join the rebellion, causing her to be expelled from the apartment she rented due to her inability to pay it. Later, Djotodia returned to Cotonou, and Chantal married Michel Djotodia in Cotonou on 27 June 2012.

== First Lady ==
Soon after Djotodia managed to topple Bozize, Chantal went to Bangui and became the first lady.

As a first lady, she founded a foundation aiming to assist orphans, mothers, HIV/AIDS patients, and elderly people "The Renaissance." Apart from that, Chantal donated a generator for the maternity ward, which often faced power cuts. Chantal was also one of the four African ladies who signed the Declaration of Niamey, purposing to fight fake medicine and fight against the high mortality rate problem.

== Post-First Lady ==
Anticipating the fall of Seleka regime, Chantal returned to Benin three weeks before her husband's arrival on 11 January 2014 and bought a house for the couple to live in.

In 2018, Chantal reportedly got ill and went to Dubai for medical treatment.
