= Mouvement de Résistance Populaire pour la Refondation de la Centrafrique =

People’s Resistance Movement for the Refoundation of the Central African Republic (French: Mouvement de Résistance Populaire pour la Refondation de la Centrafrique; MRPRC) is the main organization claiming to be the political representatives of the anti-balaka rebels. It is led by Levy Yakete. In March 2013, President François Bozizé (a Christian) was overthrown in the Central African Republic conflict by a mostly Muslim rebel coalition known as Séléka. The MRPRC was created at that time to resist the Muslim nomads and restore Bozizé to power. A series of atrocities in early 2014 committed by anti-balaka led the United Nations to condemn Yakete and the anti-balaka movement.
