= Hyacinthe Wodobodé =

Central African politician

Mayor of Bangui
- In office 7 February 2014 – 6 May 2016
- Preceded by: Catherine Samba-Panza
- Succeeded by: Émile Gros Raymond Nakombo

Personal details
- Born: 16 March 1953 (age 72); Bangui, Ubangi-Shari

Hyacinthe Wodobodé (born 16 March 1953) is a Central African politician.

== Life ==
Wodobodé was born on 16 March 1953 in Bangui. She studied business management, hospital sciences and financial planning in Belgium before returning to work as a civil servant in the Central African Republic in 1983. In 2007, she was appointed coordinator of the National AIDS Committee (Comité national de lutte contre le sida, CNLS). In 2014, Catherine Samba-Panza appointed her as her successor as Mayor of Bangui. In 2016, she was replaced as mayor by Emile Gros Raymond Nakombo.
