= Gula people =

African ethnic group

Gula
Total population
- 17,000

Regions with significant populations
- Central African Republic; Chad; Sudan

Languages
- Gula, Arabic, French

Religion
- Islam

Linguistic map of the non-Arab peoples of Darfur.

Gula, also spelled Goula, is an ethnic group who lives in Central African Republic, Chad, and Sudan. In the Central African Republic, they live in the northern regions of Vakaga, Bamingui-Bangoran, and Haute-Kotto.

== History ==
Gula people are believed to have originated from Blue Nile region in Ethiopia. Around 1750, they migrated to Darfur. In Darfur, the Gula people faced hostility from the Fur. Consequently, they migrated to an area near Lake Mamoun, Vakaga, in 1795. Lake Mamoun was chosen because there was plenty of fish, and the area was uninhabited before they arrived.

In the 19th century, Gula people were often attacked by slave raiders from Darfur, Dar al Kuti, and Kara. Moreover, they had to pay a tribute of 1,000 slaves, ivory, honey, and copper to Darfur. Enslavement of Gula reached its peak in 1890-1911 when Dar al Kuti's ruler, Muhammad al-Sanussi, sent slave raiders to the Gula region to obtain slaves and pillage the villages. Hence, by 1905, Vakaga was depopulated and Gula fled to either N'Délé or Abéché. Gula only returned to Vakaga after France subjugated Dar al Kuti in 1911.

In 1926–1927, France ordered Gula to live in settlements along the Ouanda Djalle-Birao Road for defensive purposes. They also recruited Gula men for the Congo–Ocean Railway project. Some Gula refused to follow France's order and fled to Chad. Around 1960, Gula converted from animism to Islam. Nevertheless, they still retained some pre-Islam practices.

== Groups ==
Gula is divided into two major groups and eight subgroups:

Major Group	Sub Group	Villages
Water People	Molo or Gula Mamoun	Ndolo Sere or Kididji, Vodomasa, Oulou, Mangafara, Jenzir, Sadjer, Ngede, and Boromata
Water People	Mele	Mélé
Water People	Moto Mar	Gordil and Manou
Water People	Sara	Maka, Ndiffa I, Kava Guludu (Ndifa), Ketebe, Kabala, Dem Ngonj and Lemena III
Water People	Mere	Tiringoulou and Ouandjia
Mountain People	Zura or Koto	Sergobo and Kumba
Mountain People	Woso	
Mountain People	Mutu	

Each sub-group has its dialect and Sara is the most distinct dialect.

== Social life ==
Gula is a patrilineal society. For marriage, Gula allows levirate marriage. Polygamy is common practice among Gula people.

== Economic life ==
Gula people heavily rely on agriculture, hunting, and fishing for their livelihood. Millet, sorghum, and peanuts are the plants that the Gula people cultivate. They also made alcoholic beverages made from millet. Manovo-Gounda St. Floris National Park is the place where Gula does their hunting activities.

Nowadays, Gula also involve in diamond mining activity in Bria.

== Notable people ==
- Arnaud Djoubaye Abazène, current minister of justice
- Herbert Gontran Djono Ahaba, Central African politician and current minister of transport and civil aviation
- Michel Djotodia, former president of Central African Republic
- Joseph Kalite, former minister of agriculture and health.
- Damane Zakaria, Central African warlord and former leader of Patriotic Rally for the Renewal of the Central African Republic
- Joseph Zoundeiko, Central African warlord

== Bibliography ==
- Barber, Kenneth B. (1980). An ecological survey of the St. Floris National Park, Central African Republic (Thesis). Michigan State University.
- UNICEF Mendiguren (September 2012). Etude anthropologique de l'organisation sociale et politique des communautés en Centrafrique et des organisations à assise communautaire (PDF) (Report).
