= Manou, Central African Republic =

Manou
- Location in Central African Republic
- Coordinates: 9°34′54″N 21°43′17″E
- Country: Central African Republic
- Prefecture: Vakaga
- Sub-prefecture: Birao
- Commune: Ouandja
- Time zone: UTC + 1

Manou is a mining village situated 5 km from Gordil in Vakaga Prefecture, Central African Republic.

== History ==
In 1962, Manou had a population of 202 people.

Wagner mercenaries visited Manou on 26 May 2022, and they looted 40 bags of flour, 60 cans of oil, and 60 bags of sugar from the shops. PRNC rebels attacked FACA checkpoint in Manou on 31 January 2024. They briefly captured it and later withdrew due to the arrival of FACA reinforcement. One soldier was killed and two injured. The rebel lost its three militia and the chief of staff of PRNC, Mohamed Ali alias B13, was reportedly killed due to the injury that his sustained after the attack.

== Demography ==
Gula of Moto Mar inhabit Manou.
