= Tina Touadéra =

First Lady of Central African Republic (since 2016)

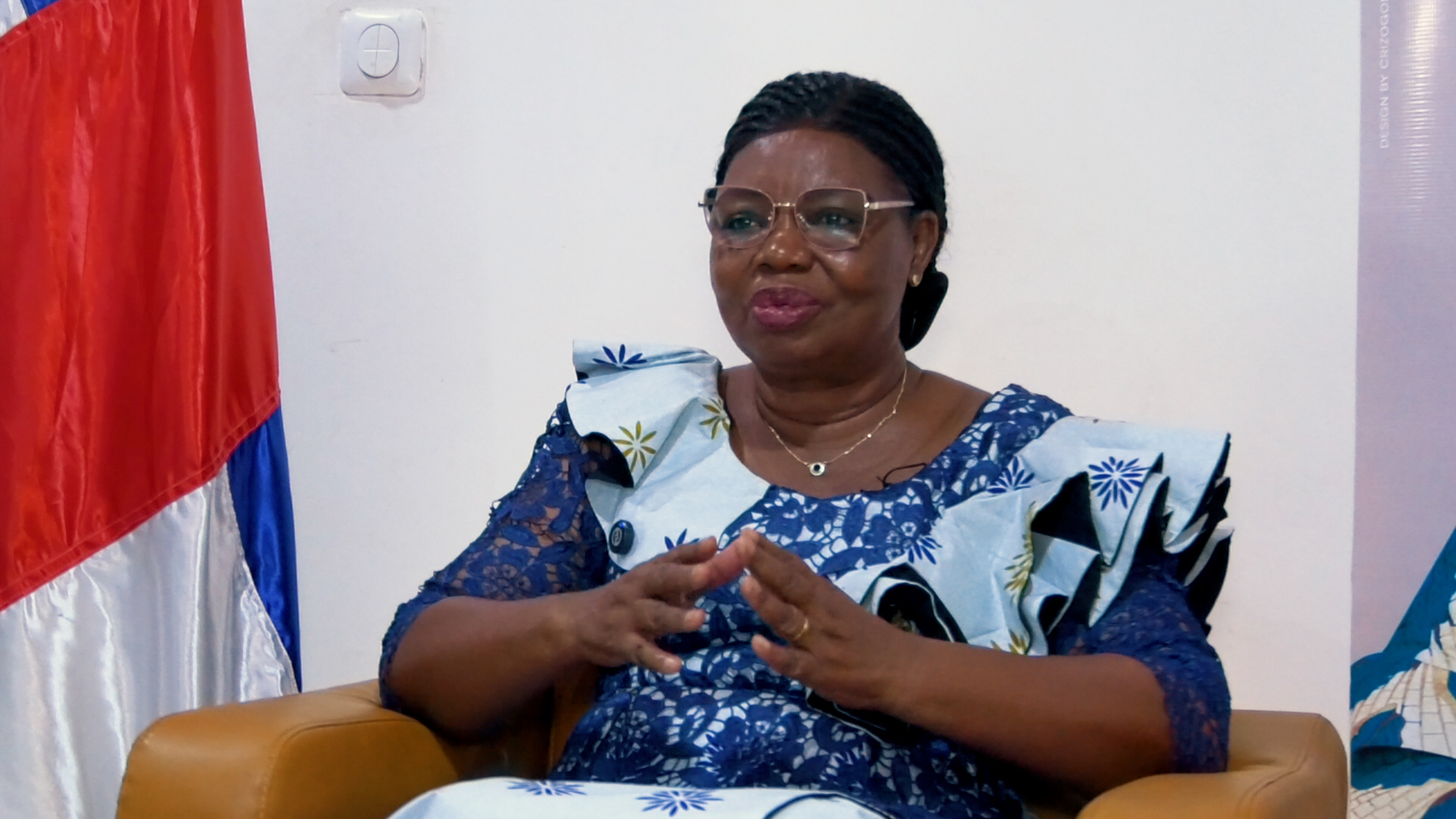
- First Lady Tina Touadéra in 2019

First Lady of the Central African Republic
- Incumbent
- Assumed office 30 March 2016 Serving with Brigitte Touadéra
- President: Faustin-Archange Touadéra
- Preceded by: Cyriaque Samba-Panza (as First Gentleman)

Personal details
- Spouse: Faustin-Archange Touadéra

Tina Marguerite Touadéra is a Central African public figure and one of the two wives of Central African Republic President Faustin-Archange Touadéra. She has served as First Lady of Central African Republic since March 2016, sharing the role with President Touadéra's other co-wife, Brigitte Touadéra. President Faustin-Archange Touadéra is polygamous and has two wives, First Lady Brigitte Touadéra and First Lady Tina Touadéra. Both women share, and reportedly compete for, the role of first lady of the Central African Republic.

During her tenure as first lady, Touadéra has focused on economic development and vocational training for women in the Central African Republic, including handicrafts, agriculture, and entrepreneurship. She has also worked on women's health initiatives, including maternal mortality, cervical cancer, and breast cancer. In January 2024, First Lady Touadéra was the National Nutrition Ambassador by the Scaling Up Nutrition (SUN) Civil Society Alliance.
