= Sergobo =

Village in Vakaga, Central African Republic

- Location in the Central African Republic
- Coordinates: 9°39′40″N 22°38′13″E
- Country: Central African Republic
- Prefecture: Vakaga
- Sub-prefecture: Birao
- Commune: Ouandja
- Time zone: UTC + 1

Sergobo, also spelled Seregobo, is a village in Vakaga Prefecture, Central African Republic that is inhabited by Gula.

== History ==
During the Central African Republic Bush War, FACA torched 34 houses and killed five civilians. Sergobo became a ghost town in February 2007. In early August 2009, Kara militia attacked Sergobo.

== Education ==
There is one school in the village.

== Healthcare ==
Sergobo has one public health post.
