= Brigitte Touadéra =

First Lady of Central African Republic (since 2016)

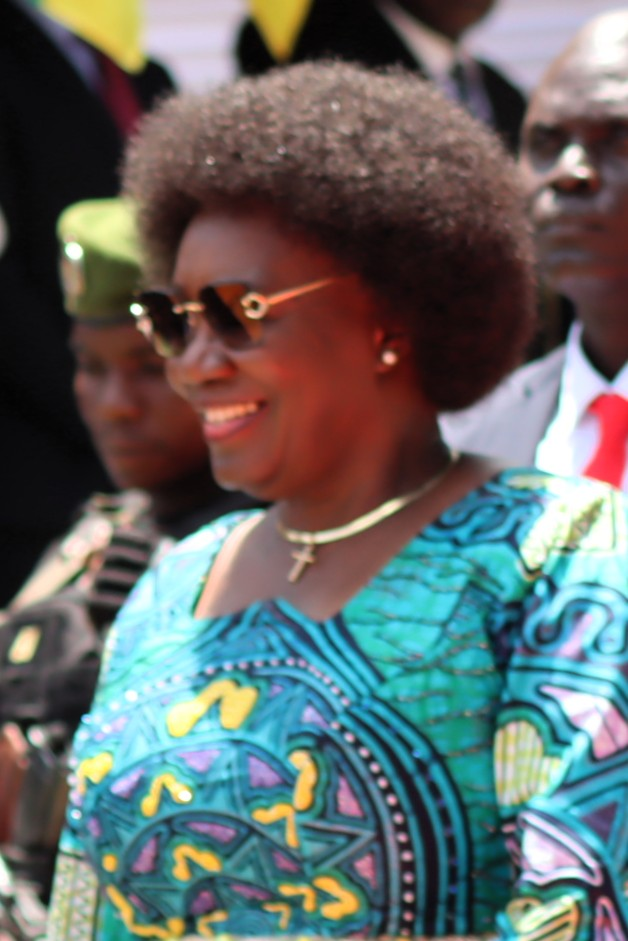
- Touadéra at the 65th independence day commemoration in August 2025

First Lady of the Central African Republic
- Incumbent
- Assumed office 30 March 2016 Serving with Tina Touadéra
- President: Faustin-Archange Touadéra
- Preceded by: Cyriaque Samba-Panza (as First Gentleman)

Personal details
- Spouse: Faustin-Archange Touadéra

Brigitte Touadéra is a Central African auditor, consultant, and one of the two wives of Central African Republic President Faustin-Archange Touadéra. She has served as First Lady of Central African Republic since March 2016, sharing the role with President Touadéra's other co-wife, Tina Touadéra. President Faustin-Archange Touadéra is polygamous and has two wives, First Lady Brigitte Touadéra and First Lady Tina Touadéra. Both women share, and reportedly compete for, the role of first lady of the Central African Republic. She has focused on maternal health, infant mortality, and reproductive health as first lady.

== Biography ==
Prior to becoming first lady, Brigitte Touadéra worked in auditing and consulting for PricewaterhouseCoopers' office in the Central African Republic.

In 2018, First Lady Touadéra established the Cri de Coeur d’une Mère Foundation, a non-governmental organization focusing on social services, food insecurity, reproductive healthcare, and women's issues. She also serves as the president of her foundation.
