= Délembé =

- Location in the Central African Republic
- Coordinates: 9°50′49″N 22°38′47″E
- Country: Central African Republic
- Prefecture: Vakaga
- Sub-prefecture: Birao
- Commune: Ridina

Population (2020)
  - Total: 1,441
- Time zone: UTC + 1

Délembé is a village in Vakaga, Central African Republic.

== History ==
In 1962, Délembé had a population of 259 people.

During Central African Republic Bush War, UFDR captured Délembé on 31 October 2006. They looted hospitals and killed five civilians, two of them were children.

In 2009, 34 houses were burned in Délembé following the death of young Gula men by crucifixion.

== Demography ==
Kara makes up the majority of Délembé's population.

== Education ==
There is one school in the village.

== Healthcare ==
Délembé has one public health post.
