= Ministry of Justice (Central African Republic) =

Government ministry of the Central African Republic

The Ministry of Justice and Human Rights of the Central African Republic is responsible for providing justice for the government and the nation's citizens. In addition, the ministry oversees the operations of the Special Criminal Court to ensure that genocide and war crimes that were committed after January 1, 2003 are properly prosecuted.

== List of ministers (Post-1976 when the Central African Empire was established) ==
- Augustin Dallot-Befio (1976)
- Joseph Potolot (1977)
- Antoine Grothe (1977-1978)
- Michel Robinet De-Saint-Omer (1978-1979)
- Francis Guerot (1980)
- Simon Narcisse Bozanga (1980-1981)
- Alphonse Mbaikoua (1981-1982)
- Xavier-Sylvestre Yangongo (1982-1984)
- Gaspard Kalene (1984-1985)
- Bernard Beloum (1985-1986)
- Jean-Louis Gevril Yambala (1987)
- Thomas Mapouka (1988-1989)
- Jean Willybiro-Sako (1990)
- Christopher Grelombe (1990-1991)
- Jean Kpwoka (1991-1992)
- Marcel Metefara (1993)
- Jacques Mbosso (1993-1995)
- Mbeti Maras (1995-1996)
- Aristide Sokambi (1996-1997)
- Marcel Metefara (1997-1999)
- Laurent Gomina Pampali (1999-2000)
- Denis Wangoa-Kisimale (2000-2001)
- Marcel Metefara (2001-2003)
- Faustin Baudou (2003-2006)
- Paul Otto (2006-2013)
- Jacques Mbosso (2013-2014)
- Isabelle Gaudeuille (2014-2016) [1st female]
- Aristide Sokambi (2016-2017)
- Flavien M'bata (2017–2021)
- Arnaud Djoubaye Abazène (2021–present)

== See also ==
- Justice ministry
- Politics of the Central African Republic
