= Levy Yakete =

Central African militant

- Born: 1965; Bangui, Central African Republic
- Died: 15 November 2014 (aged 48–49)
- Military career
- Allegiance: Anti-balaka
- Service years: 2013–2014

Levy Yakete (born 1965 in Bangui, died 15 November 2014 in Bangui) was the political coordinator of the Anti-balaka group known as People’s Resistance Movement for Reforming of the Central African Republic.

Sanctions were imposed on him by the United Nations Security Council Resolution 2134 (2014) for his involvement in the ongoing Central African Republic conflict. He acted as the spokesperson for ousted president François Bozizé.

He reportedly died on 15 November 2014.
