= Mahamat Kamoun =

Central African politician

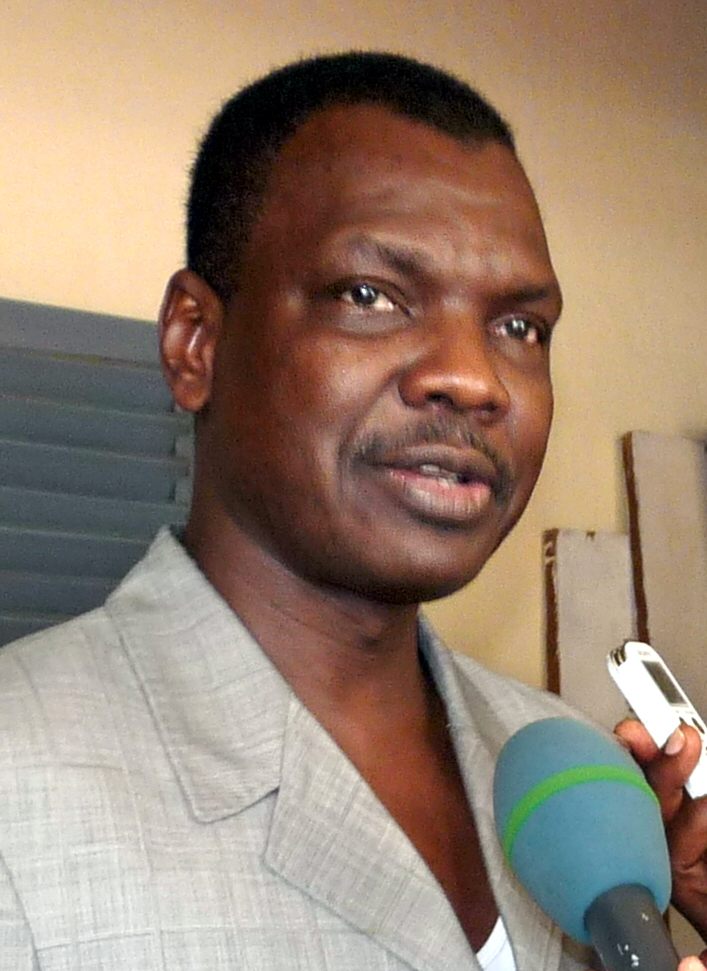

Acting Prime Minister of the Central African Republic
- In office 10 August 2014 – 2 April 2016
- President: Catherine Samba-Panza (Acting)
- Preceded by: André Nzapayeké (Acting)
- Succeeded by: Simplice Sarandji

Personal details
- Born: 13 November 1961 (age 65) N'Délé, Central African Republic
- Party: Independent
- Education: Boston University
- Profession: Politician, financier

Mahamat Kamoun (born 13 November 1961) is a Central African politician and financier who served as Acting Prime Minister of the Central African Republic from 10 August 2014 to 2 April 2016. He was the country's first Muslim Prime Minister.

== Political career ==
A specialist in finance, Kamoun served as the Director-General of the Treasury under President Francois Bozize. He subsequently served as the head of the cabinet of President Michel Djotodia and was an advisor to interim president Catherine Samba-Panza before his appointment as Prime Minister.

=== Prime minister ===
Kamoun's appointment as Prime Minister sparked discontent and astonishment among the Muslim Séléka rebel group, as the group does not consider Kamoun as a member of Séléka, despite Kamoun being a Muslim. The group subsequently boycotted the National Unity Government as they were not consulted about the choice of Prime Minister, and even threatened to withdraw from the ceasefire agreement signed in Brazzaville in July 2014 as a result of Kamoun's appointment.

He oversaw the December 2015–February 2016 presidential election, saying "The warlords will have to accept the results of the elections because the elections are democratic, elections are one of the solutions to bring people back to peace, but they can also be a new source of crisis if we do not manage to make them democratic, transparent and credible." A month prior to the elections, Kamoun installed a night time curfew amid rising tensions and violence in the capital Bangui. Following the election, the newly elected President Faustin-Archange Touadéra named Simplice Sarandji as Kamoun's replacement as Prime Minister on 2 April 2016.

Political offices
Preceded by André Nzapayeké; Acting	Prime Minister of the Central African Republic; Acting; 2014–2016	Succeeded by Simplice Sarandji
