= André Nzapayeké =

Central African politician (born 1951)

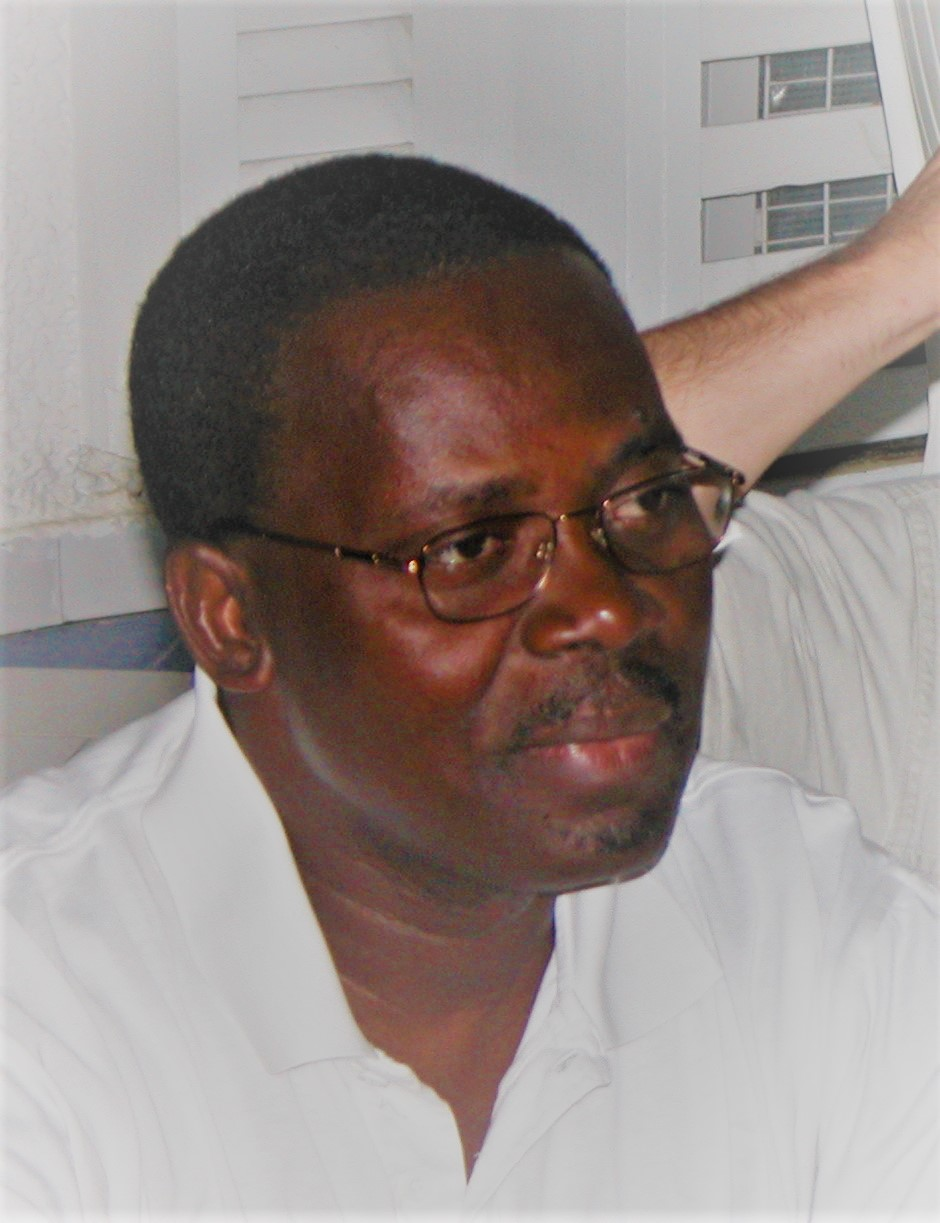
- Nzapayeké in Tunisia, 2006.

Acting Prime Minister of the Central African Republic
- In office 25 January 2014 – 10 August 2014
- President: Catherine Samba-Panza (Transitional)
- Preceded by: Nicolas Tiangaye
- Succeeded by: Mahamat Kamoun (Acting)

Personal details
- Born: 20 August 1951 (age 75) Bangassou, French Equatorial Africa (present-day Central African Republic)
- Party: Independent
- Spouse: Diallo Djenabou Mariama (divorced in 2016)
- Profession: Politician, banker

André Nzapayeké (born 20 August 1951) is a Central African politician and banker who served as Acting Prime Minister of the Central African Republic from 25 January 2014 to 10 August 2014.

== Early career ==
Nzapayeké was born on 20 August 1951 in Bangassou, French Equatorial Africa. The son of a pastor who also worked as a trader, he was a bright student who received a scholarship to study social anthropology at the University of Amsterdam. Nzapayeké worked in Central Africa in the development sector, studying many villages of the country. Later, he worked as a consultant, and also taught at the university. In the early 1990s, he was in the Security Council of the Government. He was briefly Minister of Rural Development under André Kolingba.

A technocrat, Nzapayeké rose to secretary-general of the African Development Bank and vice president of the Development Bank of Central African States from 2010 to 2012. Within the Development Bank, he worked on the implementation of the peace agreements between the various parties during the conflict in Sudan. He also had a job at the World Bank. He is a Christian.

== Political career ==
He was appointed as Prime Minister in January 2014 during the 2012–14 conflict. His appointment followed that of President Catherine Samba-Panza and the resignation of Nicolas Tiangaye. Samba-Panza nominated him for the office, and he too was tasked with leading the country to the 2015 election. Nzapayeké was little-known in the Central African Republic at the time of his appointment. He said his first priority would be to stop the massacres and other atrocities within the country for months as the key step to restoring the writ of the state and then help the one million displaced persons.

I am going to be speaking with the different groups so that we immediately stop certain... atrocities being carried out in this country. We have to put a stop to all that quickly. There's a certain number of very clear actions the government is going to tackle starting this week. [I will] put a team in place that's going to deal with the question of national reconciliation. We have to tackle that quickly, it will make the security question easier. [We will seek help from] friends in the international community.

State radio announced Nzapayeké's resignation on 5 August 2014. The reason for his resignation was the breakdown in peace talks in Brazzaville. He was replaced by Mahamat Kamoun.

Since June 2015 he is ambassador of the Central African Republic in Southern Africa, since October 2016 also in New Zealand and since May 2017 in the Seychelles.

Political offices
Preceded by Nicolas Tiangaye	Prime Minister of the Central African Republic; Acting; 2014	Succeeded by Mahamat Kamoun; Acting
