= Catherine Samba-Panza =

Central African lawyer and politician (born 1954)

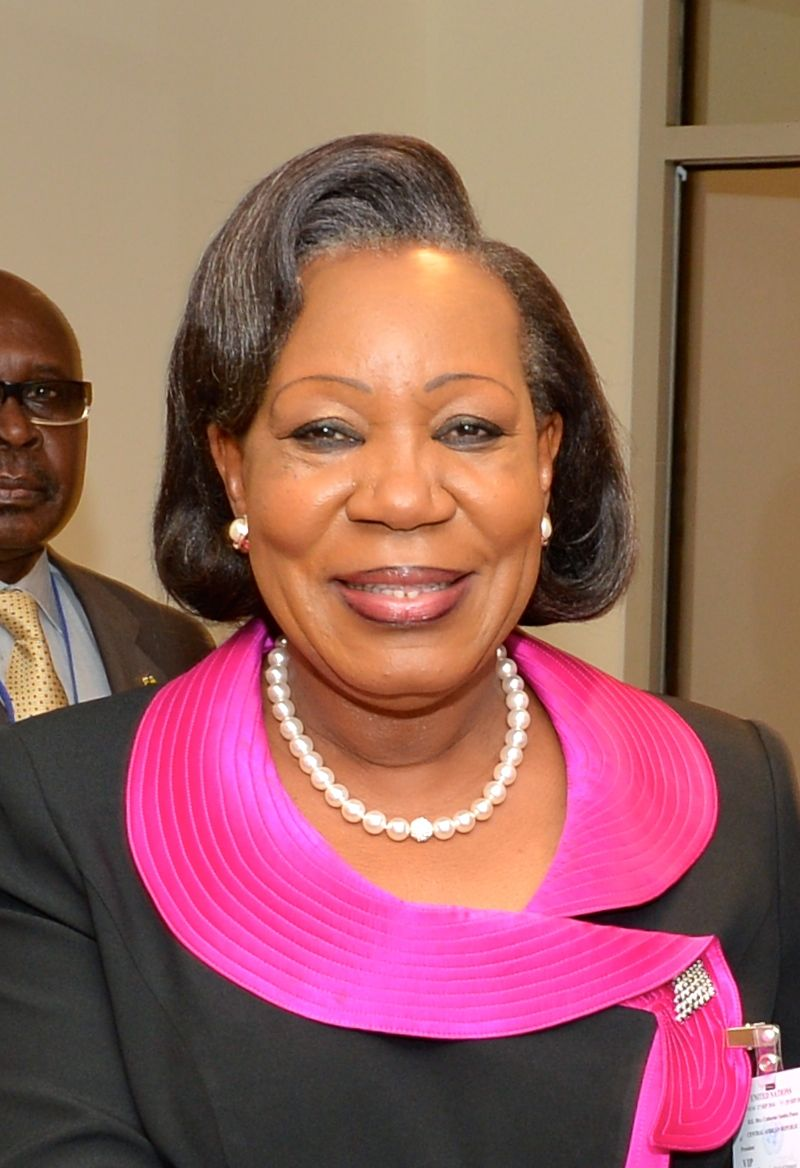
- Samba-Panza in 2014

Transitional President of the Central African Republic
- In office 23 January 2014 – 30 March 2016
- Prime Minister: André Nzapayeké; Mahamat Kamoun
- Preceded by: Alexandre-Ferdinand Nguendet (Acting)
- Succeeded by: Faustin-Archange Touadéra

Mayor of Bangui
- In office 14 June 2013 – 23 January 2014
- Preceded by: Nazaire Yalanga Nganaféï
- Succeeded by: Hyacinthe Wodobodé

Personal details
- Born: Catherine Souga; 26 June 1954 (age 72) Fort Lamy, French Equatorial Africa (present-day N'Djamena, Chad)
- Party: Independent
- Spouses: Jean-Claude Sappot (divorced) Cyriaque Samba-Panza (m. 1998)
- Children: Stéphane; Christelle; Jimmy
- Education: Panthéon-Assas University
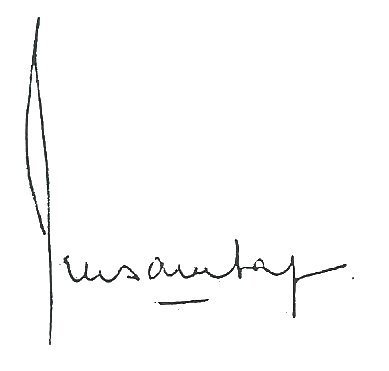
- Signature

Catherine Samba-Panza (née Souga; born 26 June 1954) is a Central African politician who served as Transitional President of the Central African Republic from 2014 to 2016. She was the first woman to serve as head of state in the Central African Republic. Prior to her tenure as acting president, she was the Mayor of Bangui from 2013 to 2014.

Samba-Panza began her career operating an insurance brokerage and working as a women's rights advocate. She was chosen in 2003 to serve as the vice president of a national reconciliation conference, and she was then chosen as president of the subsequent committee to implement the conference's recommendations. She was appointed mayor of Bangui in 2013 after the city was devastated by the Central African Republic Civil War. She was then appointed to serve as transitional president of the Central African Republic in 2014. She was tasked with restoring stability to the nation by disarming militant groups, and she emphasized the nation's economic recovery through employment and foreign aid. Her term ended in 2016. She was a presidential candidate in the 2020–21 election, but she was unsuccessful.

== Early life and career ==
Catherine Souga was born on 26 June 1954 in Fort Lamy, French Chad, as the second oldest of her parents' six children. Her mother, Henriette Waloma (also spelled Warouma), was from Ubangi-Shari—later the Central African Republic (CAR), while her father, Barthélémy Djou, was an accountant from French Cameroon. She was raised in N'Djamena until the age of either 16 or 18, when the family decided to move to Bangui, Central African Republic. Once in Bangui, she worked and studied with her maternal uncle, Simon-Pierre Kibanda, a diplomat who served as secretary at the Ministry of Foreign Affairs before being appointed chief of protocol beginning in 1971, and his Israeli wife, Sonia.

Souga, who had begun secondary school in N'Djamena, graduated from Marie-Jeanne Caron High School (lycée Marie-Jeanne Caron) in Bangui and completed her A4 baccalaureate in 1973 at Lycée d'Etat des Rapides. She then studied corporate law in Bangui. She then moved to Paris to study journalism and law and graduated from a diploma of specialized higher studies (DESS) in insurance law from Panthéon-Assas University in 1981. Following her graduation, Samba-Panza worked as an underwriter for the Préservatrice – Foncière insurance agency in Paris.

Samba-Panza was married to her first husband, Jean-Claude Sappot, while working and studying in France. The couple had three children: Stéphane, Christelle and Jimmy. Her marriage to Sappot ended in divorce.

In 1984, she returned to Bangui to join the staff of the Cantral African state-owned insurance company, SIRIRI. She then joined the Allianz's "AGF Centrafrique Assurances" subsidiary, where she worked from 1989 until 2007. Samba-Panza also founded her own brokerage firm, CSP Assurances-Conseils, but reportedly found that corruption made it difficult to operate such a company in the Central African Republic. In the late 2000s, she was hired by another brokerage, Gras Savoye, where she served as managing director until 2013.

In 1998, Samba-Panza married her second husband, Cyriaque Samba-Panza, a former CAR government official whom Jeune Afrique described as a "well-known political figure" within the country. Cyriaque Samba-Panza has served as a government minister for several tenures under former Presidents André Kolingba and François Bozizé, beginning with Secretary of State for Planning, Statistics and International Cooperation in 1987.

=== Activism and political career ===
Samba-Panza also entered civil society at this time, working with non-governmental organizations. She placed particular emphasis on work as a women's rights advocate. She affiliated with the women's rights group, the Association of Women Lawyers of Central Africa, and with this group she supported women in government, assistance for sexual violence victims, and the end of female genital mutilation. Samba-Panza has also called for economic support for women in Africa, demanding that African governments do more to further women-owned businesses. She has said that she was able to escape some of the discrimination faced by women because she "was always a fighter", and she has lamented that many women in the CAR "don't know their rights so they can't defend them".

Samba-Panza took her first political position in 2003, when she was named the vice president of a national reconciliation conference by President François Bozizé after he seized power in a coup. She was then chosen as the president of the committee to implement the conference's recommendations.

== Mayor of Bangui ==
Samba-Panza was appointed mayor of Bangui in May 2013 by the government of Michel Djotodia after he seized power in a coup. She took office on 14 June 2013. Though she was a Christian, her appointment was accepted by both the Muslim Séléka and the Christian Anti-balaka factions due to her reputation for neutrality. While serving as mayor, she insisted that she would step down as soon as elections were held.

As the interim mayor, Samba-Panza was tasked with rebuilding the city after it was devastated by the Central African Republic Civil War. All of the city's funds and supplies had been looted, and much of its infrastructure had been destroyed. Her strategy to address the city's funding problem included raising taxes and courting foreign aid. For her work, she came to be known as "the courageous mayor". She was succeeded as mayor by Hyacinthe Wodobodé, who was appointed on 14 February 2014.

== Transitional president ==
=== Taking office ===
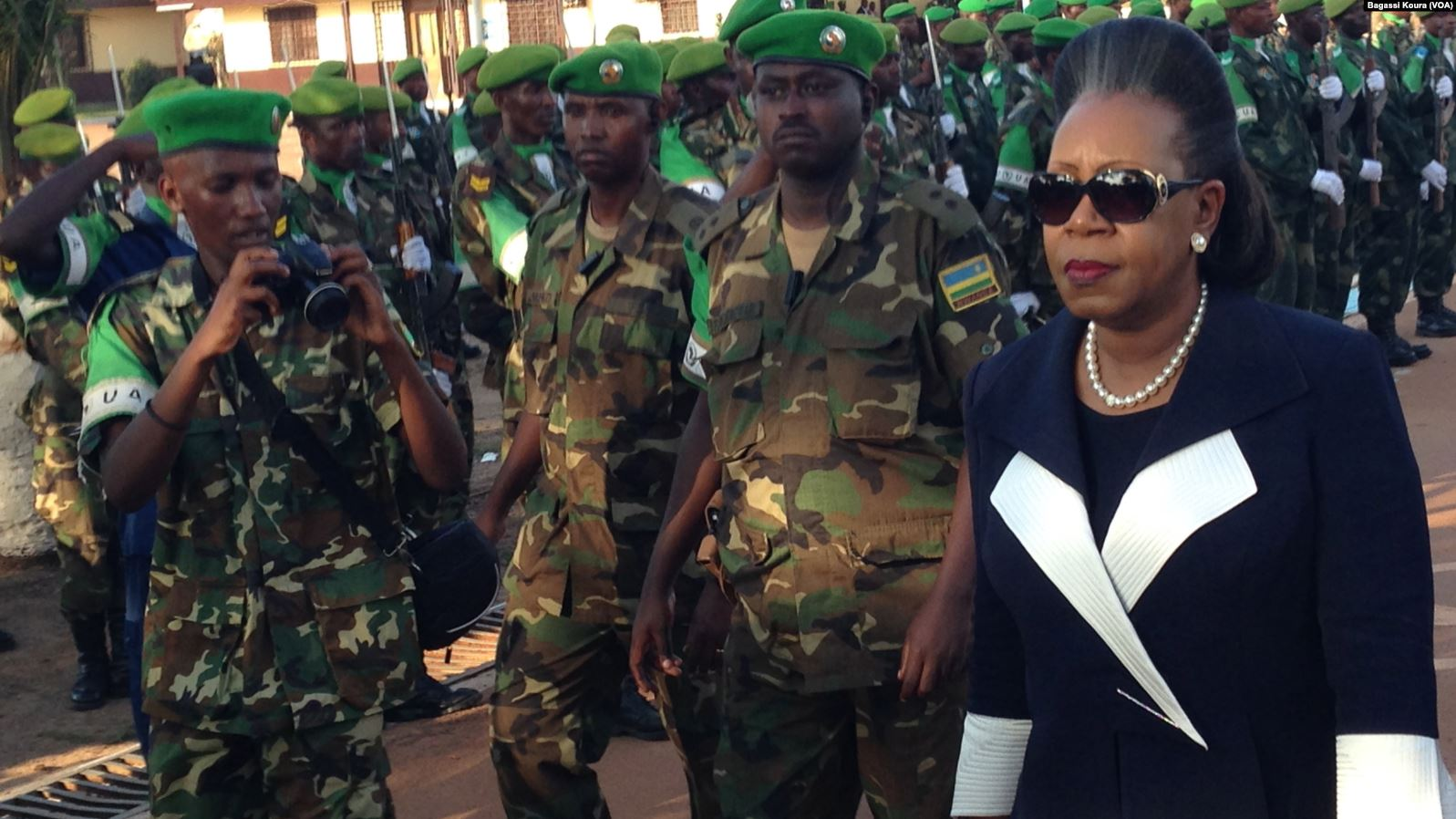
Samba-Panza with African Union soldiers in 2014

Following an escalation of the conflict in the CAR, Djotodia stepped down after nine months in power. Samba-Panza was chosen as the interim president, replacing acting president Alexandre-Ferdinand Nguendet. She was chosen from a list of eight candidates who had to prove they had no links to either the Séléka or the Anti-balaka. Samba-Panza later said that she accepted the position because she "couldn't stand by and do nothing while [her] country fell into chaos". Her call for talks between both sides to the conflict was welcomed by the parties. After beating Désiré Kolingba in a second round ballot 75 to 53, she said:

"I call on my children, especially the anti-balaka, to put down their arms and stop all the fighting. The same goes for the ex-Séléka – they should not have fear. I don't want to hear any more talk of murders and killings. Starting today, I am the president of all Central Africans, without exclusion."

Samba-Panza was sworn in as President on 23 January 2014, with a mandate to serve until the next election, which was scheduled for 2015. On the day of her inauguration, civil conflict killed an estimated sixteen people within the capital's suburbs. Her appointment as president was seen as a positive change by observers and foreign investors, as she was chosen for popular support rather than taking power by force.

Samba-Panza took office during a period of lawlessness in which religious violence took place between Christian and Muslims and the government's control over the nation had collapsed. She suggested poverty and a failure of governance were the causes of the conflict. Upon taking office, Samba-Panza was the first woman to become the country's president. At the time, she was one of three female heads of state in Africa, after Ellen Johnson Sirleaf in Liberia and Joyce Banda in Malawi. Samba-Panza has spoken of Johnson Sirleaf as a role model. Her status as a female leader in a time of crisis was seen as symbolic among citizens, who felt that a woman and mother may be better equipped to bring peace between warring factions. For this reason, she was nicknamed Mother Courage. She leaned into the maternal role, believing it to be more efficient for fostering peace than acting as a more traditional leader.

=== Tenure ===
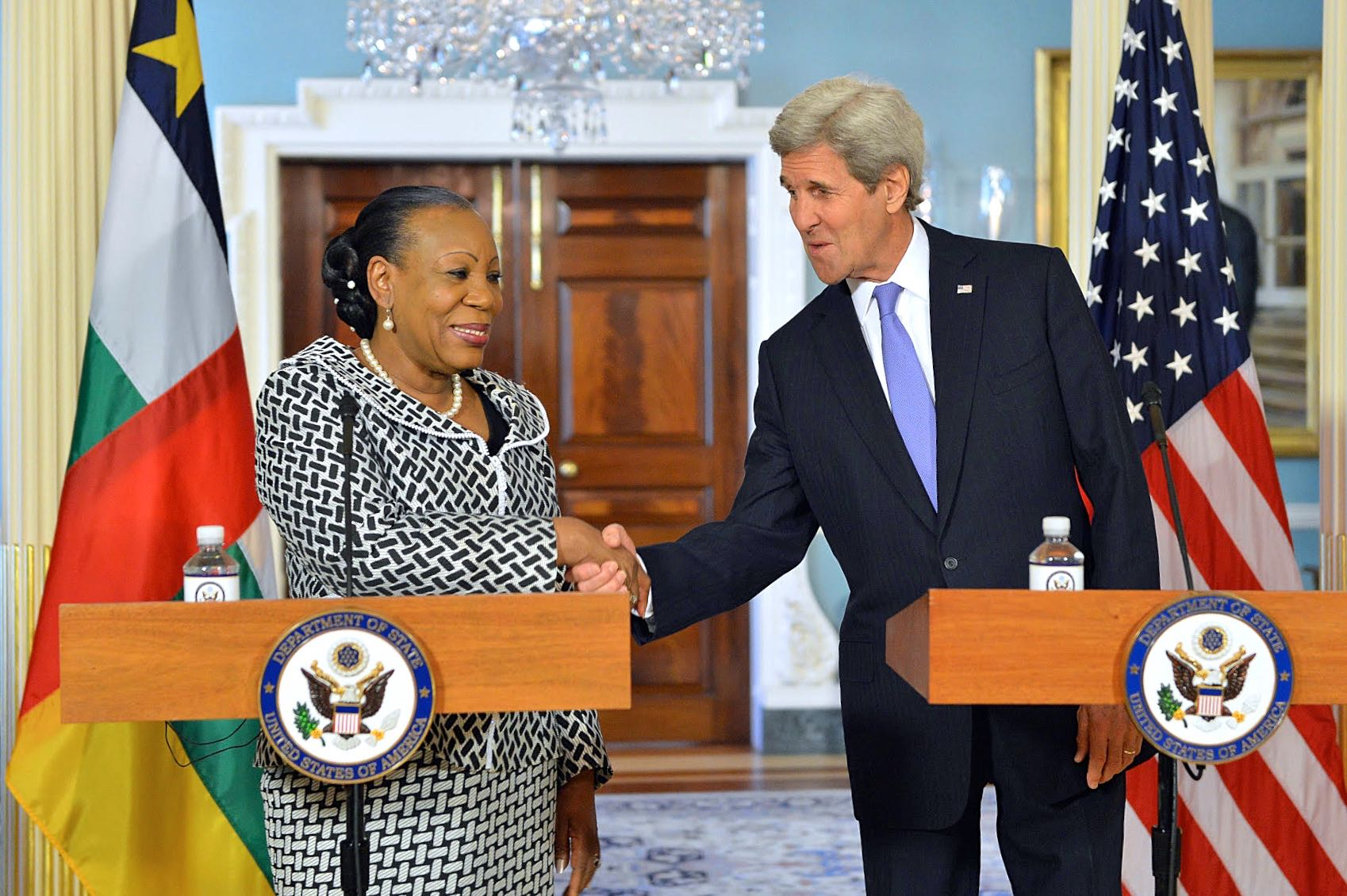
Samba-Panza with U.S. Secretary of State John Kerry in 2016

As president, Samba-Panza declared that her first priorities were to restore security and employment. She believed the two to be connected, as former militants had been left unemployed and still had the potential to commit acts of violence. Samba-Panza described her intentions during her tenure as being "to bring back peace and stability, to boost the economy and to gradually restore the rule of law". Samba-Panza argued that she did not have a political bias because her experience was in civil society instead of politics, and she likewise took on an anti-corruption platform because of her experiences in the private sector.

As the CAR had no funds of its own, Samba-Panza's government relied entirely on foreign aid. Samba-Panza welcomed the French intervention in the CAR. She weighed this against crimes committed by some French soldiers, saying that they made up a small number and had to be held responsible individually instead of as a group.

André Nzapayeké, a Christian, was appointed as Prime Minister to serve during her tenure. Samba-Panza then replaced him with Mahamat Kamoun, a Muslim, in August 2014. As the Séléka had no ties to Kamoun, it threatened to boycott the government and withdraw from the ceasefire. Samba-Panza authorized the creation of a Special Criminal Court in June 2015 to prosecute "grave international crimes committed since 2003" in conjunction with the United Nations. A surge of violence in September 2015 caused hundreds of protesters to demand Samba-Panza's resignation, and Human Rights Watch determined by the end of the year that Samba-Panza's administration had "struggled to establish security". Critics of her presidency feel that it did not meet the hopeful expectations that it set.

The 2015 general election was scheduled for February 2015. As the interim president, Samba-Panza was ineligible to run. It was postponed several times because of violence in the capital. The election was held in December 2015, but irregularities necessitated a second round of elections, which was held in February 2016. By the end of her tenure, she considered several objectives unfinished. These included disarmament and reintegration of militants, security reform, humanitarianism, and national reconciliation. During the disarmament process, Samba-Panza dismissed the idea of using force against those who did not turn in their weapons. Samba-Panza served as president until 30 March 2016, when Faustin-Archange Touadéra was sworn in as her successor.

== Post-presidency ==
Presidential campaign logo

Samba-Panza stayed in Bangui after leaving office, and she remained involved with the government as an advisor in areas such as peace mediation. She became an election observer with the Carter Center, overseeing elections in countries such as Liberia, Senegal, and the Democratic Republic of the Congo. She also took on leadership roles in intergovernmental organizations after she left office, becoming president of the Pan African Women's Leadership Observatory and co-chair of the African Union Network for Conflict Prevention and Mediation.

On 28 August, Samba-Panza announced that she would be running in the 2020 presidential election. She justified her campaign by saying that "many appealed from all sides of the political spectrum" for her to run, and she touted her willingness to step down in 2016 as a reason to trust her. Samba-Panza campaigned on security and economic development, saying that her successor failed to bring these things about. She was the only woman to run in the election. Samba-Panza was unsuccessful, receiving 5,526 votes, only 0.86% of the total votes cast.

Samba-Panza was one of several political opposition figures who were barred from leaving the country in January 2021. She was not given an explanation at the time, but the government later stated that there were ongoing investigations into opposition leaders for alleged involvement with armed groups.

== See also ==
- First women lawyers around the world
- List of the first women holders of political offices in Africa
- List of heads of state of the Central African Republic

Political offices
| Preceded by Alexandre-Ferdinand Nguendet; Acting | President of the Central African Republic; Transitional; 2014–2016 | Succeeded by Faustin-Archange Touadéra |
