= Nassolé =

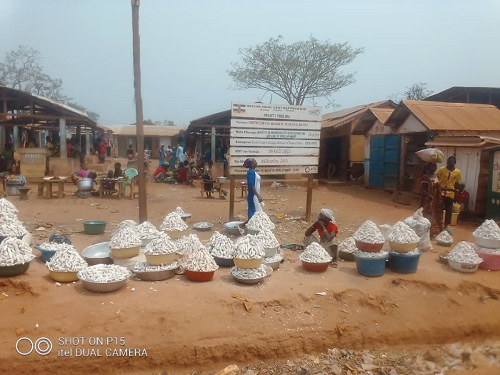
- Nassolé Market

- Location in Central African Republic
- Coordinates: 4°15′32″N 15°22′40″E
- Country: Central African Republic
- Prefecture: Mambéré-Kadéï
- Sub-prefecture: Berbérati
- Commune: Ouakanga

Nassolé is a village situated in Mambéré-Kadéï Prefecture, Central African Republic. It is the capital of Ouakanga Commune.

== History ==
Tanzania contingent of MINUSCA attacked a Siriri checkpoint in Nassolé to prevent the group from marching towards Gamboula on 22 April 2018. Ten people were killed, including the group commander, and three were captured and transferred to Berberati.

CPC controlled the village in February 2021 and erected a road blockade. FACA captured Nassolé in 2021. In January 2023, FACA manned four checkpoints in the village. A fire incident occurred in the village at the end of February 2023, destroying farm fields, houses, and a church.

== Economy ==
Nassolé has gold and diamond mines and some of the villagers work as miners. The village also has a market.

== Education ==
Nassolé has one public school.

== Healthcare ==
The village has one health center.
