= Dilapoko =

- Location in Central African Republic
- Coordinates: 4°21′45″N 15°5′28″E
- Country: Central African Republic
- Prefecture: Mambéré-Kadéï
- Sub-prefecture: Gamboula
- Commune: Basse-Boumné

Population (2014)
  - Total: 4,000

Dilapoko is a village located in Mambéré-Kadéï Prefecture, Central African Republic.

== History ==
In January 2014, 700 Muslim residents of Dilapoko fled to Cameroon. Armed Mbororo militias attacked Dilapoko in February 2014. It led some villagers to flee to Gamboula. One month later, an armed group attacked Dilapoko on 23 March. Due to the attack, all villagers fled to Gamboula and Cameroon, leaving only Anti-balaka militia in the village. The villagers began to return to Dilapoko in July 2014.

Seventy people fled Dilapoko to Berberati on 16 August 2018 due to the presence of Siriri rebels in their village.

3R rebels attacked Dilapoko on 30 August 2021. One person was killed and others were wounded. Responding to the attack, MINUSCA sent its peacekeeping forces to Dilapoko.

== Economy ==
Most Dilapoko residents rely on the agriculture sector for their livelihood. There is a market in the village, although it opens only on Sunday.Some of the villagers work at mines nearby the village.

== Education ==
The village has one school. The school was closed in March 2014 due to an attack from a militia group. In December 2018, 120 3R members occupied the school.

== Healthcare ==
There is one health center in Dilapoko.

== Bibliographies ==
- Première Urgence Internationale (November 2014a). Evaluation RRM - Rapport Complet MSA Gamboula Dilapoko (Mambere Kadei) 26 au 27 Novembre 2014 (PDF) (Report).
- Première Urgence Internationale (August 2015). Evaluation Multisectorielle RRM Rapport préliminaire - Axe Dilapoko – Beïna 1, 10 et le 13 août 2015 (PDF) (Report).
