= Health in the Central African Republic =

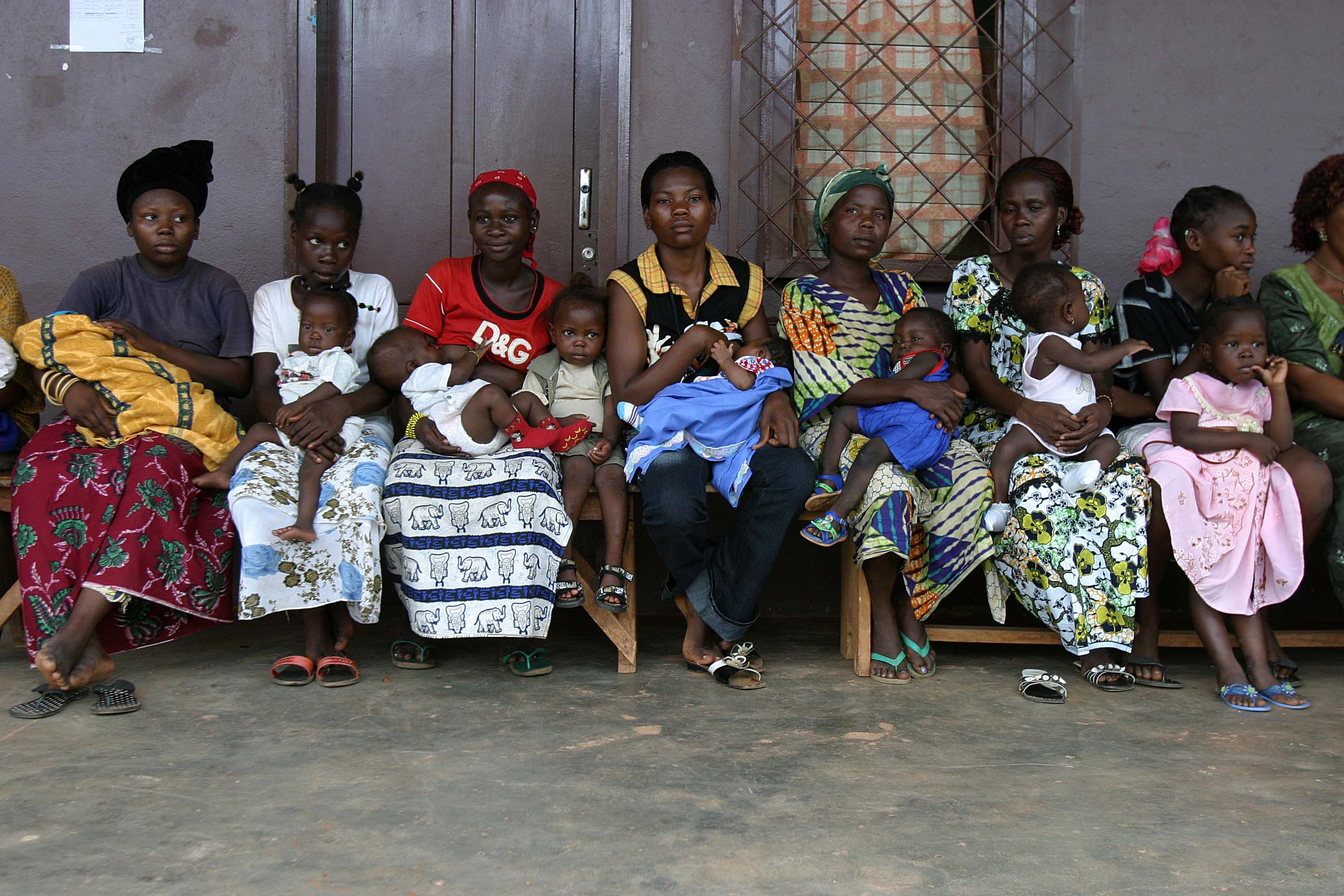
Mothers with their babies and children queued at a health clinic in Begoua, a district of Bangui, waiting for oral polio vaccine Picture from 2008. Despite progress over the past few years, medical care remains both costly and inaccessible for many families across the Central African Republic. Vaccination rates for preventable diseases stand at less than 52%, and one child in eight does not live past five years of age.

Health in the Central African Republic has been degraded by years of internal conflict and economic turmoil since independence from France in 1960. One sixth of the country's population is in need of acute medical care. Endemic diseases put a high demand on the health infrastructure, which requires outside assistance to sustain itself.

The Human Rights Measurement Initiative has found that the Central African Republic is fulfilling 65.7% of its national obligations regarding the right to health based on its income levels. When looking at the right to health with respect to children, the Central African Republic achieves 92.1% of what is expected based on its current income. In regards to the right to health amongst the adult population, the country achieves only 75.2% of what is similarly expected. The Central African Republic falls into the "very bad" category when evaluating the right to reproductive health; the nation is fulfilling only 29.8% of what is expected based on the resources (income) it has available.

== Health infrastructure ==
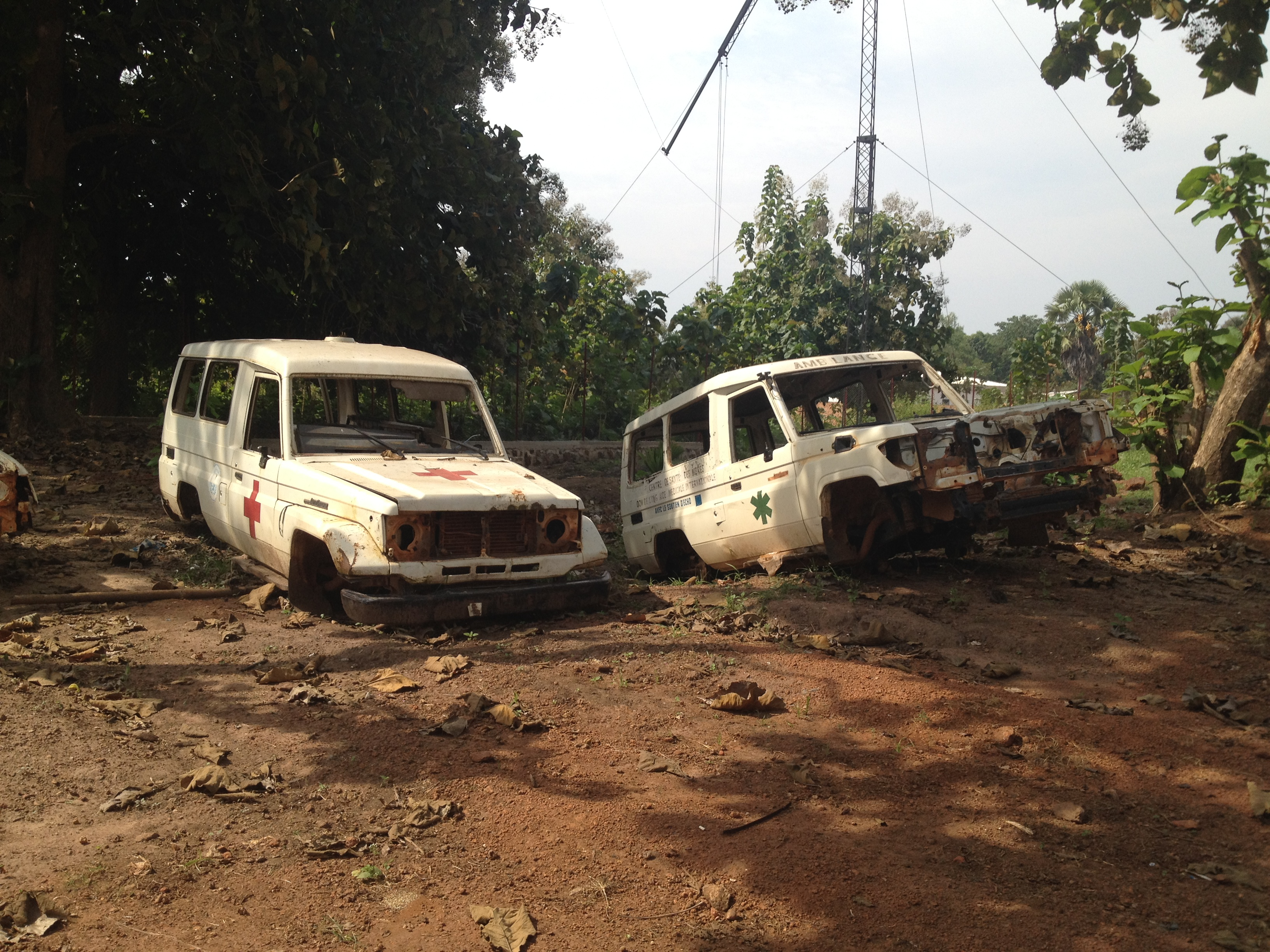
Two bush ambulances in Kaga-Bandoro that have been stripped and looted by local militias.

The largest hospitals in the country are located in Bangui district. As a member of the World Health Organization, the Central African Republic receives vaccination assistance. In 2007, female life expectancy at birth was 48.2 years, and male life expectancy 45.1 years.

The following notable hospitals are located in the Central African Republic. Cities and prefectures are listed with the name of the hospital.

- Association Centrafricaine pour le Bien-Etre Familial (ACABEF) Antenne Quaka Hospital, Bambari, Ouaka (private hospital)
- Amity Hospital, Bangui
- Bamingui-Bangoran Prefercture Hospital, N'Délé, Bamingui-Bangoran
- Bambari Regional Hospital, Bambari, Ouaka
- Community Hospital, Bangui
- Haute-Kotto Prefecture Hospital, Bria, Haute-Kotto
- Hospital at Batangafo, Batangafo, Ouham
- Hospital at Bimbo, Bimbo, Ombella-M'Poko
- Hospital at Dohiya, Dohiya, Nana-Mambéré
- Hospital at Kela Moelle, Kela Moelle, Ouham-Pendé
- Hospital at Kounpala, Kounpala, Ouham-Pendé
- Hospital at Kounpo, Kounpo, Ouham-Pendé
- Hospital at Yelewa, Yelewa, Nana-Mambéré
- Kingston-Diaspora Medical Centre, Bangui
- Nana-Grébizi Prefecture Hospital, Kaga Bandoro, Nana-Grébizi (see also Republic of Dar El Kuti
- Mambéré-Kadéï Prefecture Hospital, Berbérati, Mambéré-Kadéï
- Migaro Hospital, Bangui
- Nana-Mambéré Prefecture Hospital, Nana-Mambéré
- PS Boudok, Pokongo, Ouham
- PS Boyali Yaho, Boyali Yaho, Ouham-Pendé
- PS Oda-Kete, Oda-Kota, Ouham
- PS Patcho, Boumbala, Nana-Grébizi
- PS Tolle, Gouni, Ouham-Pendé
- PS Gbade, Boyongo, Ouham
- PS Pendé, Kalandao, Ouham-Pendé
- Sanguere Lim Hospital, Sanguere Lim, Ouham-Pendé
- University Hospital Bambari, Bambari, Ouaka

== Health status ==
=== Life expectancy ===
In 2014 the CIA estimated the average life expectancy in the Central African Republic to be 51.81 years.

A study found that nearly 6 percent of CAR’s population died within 2022, four times higher than the United Nations estimate.

=== Endemic diseases ===
Malaria is one of the leading causes of death in the Central African Republic. In 2024, UNICEF delivered over 43,200 doses of the R21/Matrix-M malaria vaccine by air funded by Gavi, with further shipment of 163,800 doses to follow. The Central African Republic is the first country to receive the R21 malaria vaccine for use in routine childhood immunization. In addition, Gavi committed US$3 million to support the Ministry of Health’s request in using data for strengthening routine immunisation, by investing in the District Health Information System (DHIS2) platform.

Yellow fever is common enough in the Central African Republic to warrant the requirement of a vaccine for all incoming travelers 9 months and older. In addition, the CDC recommends the same.

According to 2009 estimates, the HIV/AIDS prevalence is about 4.7% of the adult population (ages 15–49). This is in general agreement with the 2016 United Nations estimate of approximately 4%.

Government expenditure on health was US$20 (PPP) per person in 2006, and 10.9% of total government expenditure in 2006. There was only around 1 physician for every 20,000 persons in 2009.

=== Maternal and child healthcare ===
Women's health is poor in the Central African Republic. As of 2010, the country had the 4th highest maternal mortality rate in the world. The total fertility rate in 2014 was estimated at 4.46 children born/woman. Approximately 25% of women had undergone female genital mutilation. Many births in the country are guided by traditional birth attendants, who often have little or no formal training.

In 2010, the maternal mortality rate stood at 850 per 100,000 births. This is compared with 1570.4 in 2008 and 1757.1 in 1990. Approximately 172 children per 1,000 died before the age of 5, and the neonatal mortality rate as a percentage of children under 5 was 26%. In the Central African Republic, the number of midwives per 1,000 live births was 3, and the lifetime risk of death for pregnant women 1 in 27.

=== HIV/AIDS ===
There were 13,000 deaths from HIV/AIDS in 2007 in the CAR. and 11,000 in 2009. About 160,000 people had HIV/AIDS in 2007, with the number dropping to 140,000 in 2009, for a prevalence rate of about 3.2%. By 2016, the rate had dropped to about 2.8%, although the prevalence in gay males was over 25%.
