= Krakoma =

- Location in the Central African Republic
- Coordinates: 8°0′N 21°21′E
- Country: Central African Republic
- Prefecture: Bamingui-Bangoran
- Sub-prefecture: N'Délé
- Commune: Mbolo-Pata
- Time zone: UTC + 1

Krakoma is a village in the Bamingui-Bangoran Prefecture in the northern Central African Republic.

== History ==
In 2009, Krakoma faced numerous attacks from armed militia groups, leading to three people's deaths. Looting and house burning were also reported. Consequently, the villagers fled to the bush and soon returned to the village. However, Krakoma was attacked again, forcing the residents to seek refuge in safe places.

An alleged LRA attacked Krakoma on 20 July 2016 and kidnapped six persons. Together with Kpata, an armed group occupied Krakoma at the beginning of October 2023.

== Education ==
Krakoma has one school.

== Healthcare ==
There is one health post in the village.
