= Mindou =

- Location in the Central African Republic
- Coordinates: 8°21′27″N 20°36′5″E
- Country: Central African Republic
- Prefecture: Bamingui-Bangoran
- Sub-prefecture: N'Délé
- Time zone: UTC + 1

Mindou is a village in the Bamingui-Bangoran Prefecture in the northern Central African Republic.
