= Aliou =

Aliou Alihoui
- Location in the Central African Republic
- Coordinates: 8°27′21″N 20°41′40″E
- Country: Central African Republic
- Prefecture: Bamingui-Bangoran
- Sub-prefecture: N'Délé
- Elevation: 1,995 ft (608 m)
- Time zone: UTC + 1

Aliou is a village in the Bamingui-Bangoran Prefecture in the northern Central African Republic.

The nearest airport is N'Délé Airport.
