= Kori, Central African Republic =

- Location in the Central African Republic
- Coordinates: 9°0′N 19°30′E
- Country: Central African Republic
- Prefecture: Bamingui-Bangoran
- Sub-prefecture: N'Délé
- Time zone: UTC + 1

Kori is a village in the Bamingui-Bangoran Prefecture in the northern Central African Republic.

It is located on the border with Chad.
