= Bangoran =

Place in Central African Republic

- Location in the Central African Republic
- Coordinates: 8°5′N 20°21′E
- Country: Central African Republic
- Prefecture: Bamingui-Bangoran
- Sub-prefecture: Bamingui
- Time zone: UTC+1

Bangoran is a town in the Bamingui-Bangoran Prefecture in the northern Central African Republic.
