= Nianga Bitibanda =

- Location in the Central African Republic
- Coordinates: 7°35′N 20°11′E
- Country: Central African Republic
- Prefecture: Bamingui-Bangoran
- Sub-prefecture: Bamingui
- Time zone: UTC + 1

Nianga Bitibanda is a village in the Bamingui-Bangoran prefecture in the northern Central African Republic. It is situated nearby to the Bamingui River, and is also situated to the town of Bamingui.
