= Zoukoutouniala =

- Location in the Central African Republic
- Coordinates: 8°33′1″N 20°36′54″E
- Country: Central African Republic
- Prefecture: Bamingui-Bangoran
- Sub-prefecture: N'Délé
- Time zone: UTC + 1

Zoukoutouniala is a village in the Bamingui-Bangoran prefecture in the northern Central African Republic.
