= Manga, Central African Republic =

Manga
- Location in the Central African Republic
- Coordinates: 8°44′N 20°8′E
- Country: Central African Republic
- Prefecture: Bamingui-Bangoran
- Sub-prefecture: N'Délé
- Time zone: UTC + 1

Manga is a village in the Bamingui-Bangoran Prefecture in the northern Central African Republic.
