= Pata, Central African Republic =

Pata Kpata
- Location in the Central African Republic
- Coordinates: 8°3′N 21°34′E
- Country: Central African Republic
- Prefecture: Bamingui-Bangoran
- Sub-prefecture: N'Délé
- Commune: Mbolo-Pata
- Time zone: UTC + 1

Pata, also known as Kpata, is a village in the Bamingui-Bangoran prefecture in the northern Central African Republic.

== History ==
CPJP attacked Pata on 26 October 2010. They burned hundreds of houses and killed a 16-year-old girl. An alleged LRA attacked Pata on 22 July 2016. They looted civilian's belongings and abducted 7 people. The LRA's incursion caused the villagers to flee to Takara and Yangoubrindji.

An armed group visited Pata at the beginning of October 2023 to demand the villagers pay the ransom of one million CFA francs and the villagers paid it with the assistance from traders. However, four days later, the same militia group returned to the village and occupied it. They raped girls and looted shops and civilian's belonging. As a result, the villagers fled to N'Délé.

== Education ==
Pata has one school.

== Healthcare ==
The village has one health post.
