= Galo, Central African Republic =

Galo
- Location in the Central African Republic
- Coordinates: 8°28′N 20°38′E
- Country: Central African Republic
- Prefecture: Bamingui-Bangoran
- Sub-prefecture: N'Délé
- Time zone: UTC + 1

Galo is a village in the Bamingui-Bangoran Prefecture in the northern Central African Republic. Its distance from the capital, Bangui, is around 317 miles.
