= Kovogomea =

Kovogomea Kovongo Mia
- Location in the Central African Republic
- Coordinates: 8°11′21″N 20°28′37″E
- Country: Central African Republic
- Prefecture: Bamingui-Bangoran
- Sub-prefecture: Bamingui
- Time zone: UTC + 1

Kovogomea is a village in the Bamingui-Bangoran Prefecture in the northern Central African Republic. As of October 2020, it is controlled by the Popular Front for the Rebirth of Central African Republic.
