= Djamassinda =

Djamassinda Zamasinda Ndjamassida
- Location in the Central African Republic
- Coordinates: 8°31′44″N 20°29′34″E
- Country: Central African Republic
- Prefecture: Bamingui-Bangoran
- Sub-prefecture: N'Délé
- Commune: Dar El Kouti
- Time zone: UTC + 1

Djamassinda, also known as Zamasinda and Ndjamassida, is a village in the Bamingui-Bangoran Prefecture in the northern Central African Republic.

== History ==
An armed group attacked FACA position in Djamassinda on 7 September 2023, injuring one soldier.

== Healthcare ==
Djamassinda has one health post.
