= Yombo =

- Location in the Central African Republic
- Coordinates: 7°12′N 20°1′E
- Country: Central African Republic
- Prefecture: Bamingui-Bangoran
- Sub-prefecture: Bamingui
- Time zone: UTC + 1

Yombo is a village in the Bamingui-Bangoran prefecture in the northern Central African Republic. The village is home to a co-educational state school which had 467 pupils in 2003, however none of these students were indigenous. The Yombo village health center provides nursing and traditional healing services.
