= Garba, Central African Republic =

Garba
- Location in the Central African Republic
- Coordinates: 9.19975°N 20.493382°E
- Country: Central African Republic
- Prefecture: Bamingui-Bangoran
- Sub-prefecture: N'Délé
- Time zone: UTC + 1

Garba or Ngarba is a village in the Bamingui-Bangoran Prefecture in the northern Central African Republic.

== History ==
In October 2022 rebels from Coalition of Patriots for Change installed barrier in the locality. On 30 November 2022 soldiers were deployed there, clashing with rebels. On 23 January 2023 CPC rebels attacked Ngarba injuring one soldier. They withdrew after a few hours.

CPC rebels stormed FACA position in the village on 8 October 2024 and FACA managed to repel the attack. During the attack, the rebels looted shops and houses and killed one soldier. Three civilians were killed and the residents were forced to seek refuge in the bush.
