= Ngoussoua =

- Location in the Central African Republic
- Coordinates: 8°10′N 20°26′E
- Country: Central African Republic
- Prefecture: Bamingui-Bangoran
- Sub-prefecture: Bamingui
- Time zone: UTC + 1

Ngoussoua is a village in the Bamingui-Bangoran prefecture in the northern Central African Republic.
