= Dongo, Central African Republic =

- Location in the Central African Republic
- Coordinates: 8°22′12″N 20°36′29″E
- Country: Central African Republic
- Prefecture: Bamingui-Bangoran
- Sub-prefecture: N'Délé
- Time zone: UTC + 1

Dongo is a village in the Bamingui-Bangoran prefecture in the northern Central African Republic.
