= Djabossinda =

- Location in the Central African Republic
- Coordinates: 8°44′29″N 20°40′37″E
- Country: Central African Republic
- Prefecture: Bamingui-Bangoran
- Sub-prefecture: N'Délé
- Time zone: UTC + 1

Djabossinda is a village in the Bamingui-Bangoran Prefecture in the northern Central African Republic.
