= Vata, Central African Republic =

- Location in the Central African Republic
- Coordinates: 7°42′N 20°12′E
- Country: Central African Republic
- Prefecture: Bamingui-Bangoran
- Sub-prefecture: Bamingui
- Time zone: UTC + 1

Vata, Central African Republic is a village in the Bamingui-Bangoran prefecture in the northern Central African Republic.
