= Miamere =

Miamere Niameyré
- Location in the Central African Republic
- Coordinates: 8°52′N 19°50′E
- Country: Central African Republic
- Prefecture: Bamingui-Bangoran
- Sub-prefecture: N'Délé
- Commune: Dar El Kouti
- Time zone: UTC + 1

Miamere, also known as Niameyré, is a village in the Bamingui-Bangoran Prefecture in the northern Central African Republic.

== History ==
An armed group attacked FACA on 11 September 2023, killing one soldier.

== Healthcare ==
There is one health post in the village.
