= Njoko =

Village in the Central African Republic

- Location in the Central African Republic
- Coordinates: 9°1′N 19°34′E
- Country: Central African Republic
- Prefecture: Bamingui-Bangoran
- Sub-prefecture: N'Délé
- Time zone: UTC + 1

Njoko is a village in the Bamingui-Bangoran prefecture in the northern Central African Republic.

It lies on the border with Chad.
