= Dangavo =

- Location in the Central African Republic
- Coordinates: 7°51′N 20°15′E
- Country: Central African Republic
- Prefecture: Bamingui-Bangoran
- Sub-prefecture: Bamingui
- Time zone: UTC + 1

Dangavo is a village in the Bamingui-Bangoran Prefecture of the northern Central African Republic.
