= Niango Amane =

- Location in the Central African Republic
- Coordinates: 7°35′N 20°11′E
- Country: Central African Republic
- Prefecture: Bamingui-Bangoran
- Sub-prefecture: Bamingui
- Time zone: UTC + 1

Niango Amane is a village in the Bamingui-Bangoran prefecture in the northern Central African Republic.
