= Diki =

- Location in the Central African Republic
- Coordinates: 8°48′N 19°37′E
- Country: Central African Republic
- Prefecture: Bamingui-Bangoran
- Sub-prefecture: N'Délé
- Time zone: UTC + 1

Diki is a village in the Bamingui-Bangoran Prefecture in the northern Central African Republic.

On 2 August, 2023, a massacre occurred in the village when a group of armed men called together a group of the community's residents under pretense of holding a meeting. According to Ousmane Youssef, a local tribal chief, the attackers opened fire on the attendees at point-blank range, killing 13 and wounding 2 more. No group claimed responsibility.
