= Koutessako =

- Location in the Central African Republic
- Coordinates: 8°9′N 20°24′E
- Country: Central African Republic
- Prefecture: Bamingui-Bangoran
- Sub-prefecture: Bamingui
- Time zone: UTC + 1

Koutessako is a village in the Bamingui-Bangoran Prefecture in the northern Central African Republic.
