= Goz Beida, Central African Republic =

Goz Beida
- Location in the Central African Republic
- Coordinates: 8°29′29″N 20°40′0″E
- Country: Central African Republic
- Prefecture: Bamingui-Bangoran
- Sub-prefecture: N'Délé
- Time zone: UTC + 1

Goz Beida is a village in the Bamingui-Bangoran Prefecture in the northern Central African Republic.
