= Tiri, Central African Republic =

Tiri
- Location in the Central African Republic
- Coordinates: 8°45′N 20°1′E
- Country: Central African Republic
- Prefecture: Bamingui-Bangoran
- Sub-prefecture: N'Délé
- Commune: Dar El Kouti
- Time zone: UTC + 1

Tiri is a village in the Bamingui-Bangoran prefecture in the northern Central African Republic.

== History ==
On 9 March 2022 armed forces clashed with group of herders in Tiri following an altercation.

Alleged CPC attacked Tiri on 1 August 2023 in retaliation to the village chief order to the locals to vote in the referendum, although previously they intimidated the locals not to partake in it. They killed 13 people, including the village chief.

CPC captured the FACA outpost in Tiri on 10 January 2024 after attacking the government soldiers in three different directions.

== Education ==
Tiri has one school. In the past, Tiri school had three classrooms with tree-trunk benches and the building was made from straw. Due to this situation, the school had to stop its class during the rainy season. However, MINUSCA built a new building for the school made from durable materials in 2017 and was inaugurated in 2018.

== Healthcare ==
There is one health post in Tiri.
