= Golongoso =

- Location in the Central African Republic
- Coordinates: 9°0′N 19°9′E
- Country: Central African Republic
- Prefecture: Bamingui-Bangoran
- Sub-prefecture: N'Délé
- Time zone: UTC + 1

Golongoso is a village in the Bamingui-Bangoran Prefecture in the northern Central African Republic.

It lies on the border with Chad.
