= Takara, Central African Republic =

Takara
- Location in the Central African Republic
- Coordinates: 8°19′44″N 20°44′12″E
- Country: Central African Republic
- Prefecture: Bamingui-Bangoran
- Sub-prefecture: N'Délé
- Time zone: UTC + 1

Takara is a village in the Bamingui-Bangoran prefecture in the northern Central African Republic.
