= Koundi et le jeudi national =

- Directed by: Ariani Astrid Atodji
- Screenplay by: Ariani Astrid Atodji
- Produced by: Goethe Institut
- Cinematography: Isabelle Casez
- Edited by: Mathilde Rousseau Sebastian Winkels
- Release date: 2010
- Running time: 86 minutes
- Country: Cameroon

Koundi et le jeudi national is a 2010 documentary film.

== Synopsis ==
Koundi is a large village with around 1,200 inhabitants, located in Cameroon's East Province. Aware of Koundi's richness in timber, the villagers decide to use it to alleviate poverty. They organise a union, the Organisation for Communal Interests, and create a cocoa plantation over several hectares to be able to depend on themselves. They also institute "National Thursday": Once a month, they all work on the development of the cocoa plantation. Village life is shown through the prism of self-management.

== Awards ==
- Dubai 2010
- Griot de Ébano FCAT 2011
