= Goz Beida =

Goz Beïda is the main town of the Kimiti department and the Sila region of southeastern Chad.

Goz Beida may also refer to:

- Goz Beida, Central African Republic
- Goz Beïda Airport (ICAO: FTTG), Chad
- Goz Beïda National Park, Chad
