= Bahr Aouk River =

Bahr Aouk River Aoukalé
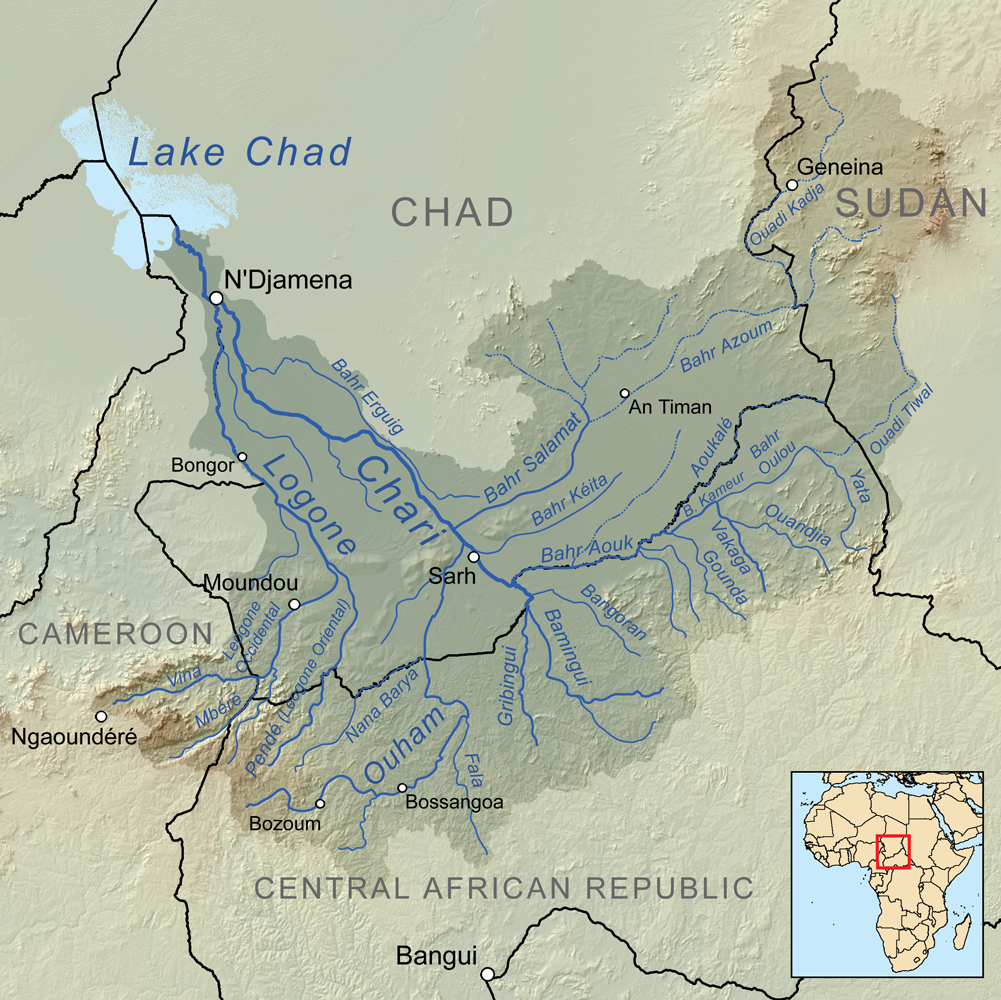

Location
- Countries: Chad; Central African Republic

Physical characteristics
- Source
  - location: Central African Republic
- Mouth
  - location: Chari River at the border region to Central African Republic, Chad
  - coordinates: 8°50′42″N 18°52′35″E
  - elevation: 367 m (1,204 ft)
- Length: 650 km (400 mi)
- Basin size: 103,577 km^{2} (39,991 sq mi)

Basin features
- Tributaries
  - left: Bahr Kameur River; Teté; Gourdai
- Protection status

Ramsar Wetland
- Official name: Plaines d'inondation des Bahr Aouk et Salamat
- Designated: 1 May 2006
- Reference no.: 1621

The Bahr Aouk River is a river in central Africa. It arises in eastern Chad at the border to Sudan and flows southwest, forming a significant portion of the international boundary between Chad and the Central African Republic. The Bahr Aouk meets the Chari River, which leaves the border and flows north into the Chad.

== Hydrometry ==
The flow of the river has been observed for over 22 years (1952–74) at Golongoso, a town just short of the Bahr Aouk's confluence with the Chari. The measured average annual flow during this period was 74 cubic metres per second (2,600 cu ft/s), draining an area of about 96,000 square kilometres (37,000 mi^{2}) which is a high proportion of the total catchment area of the river.

The average monthly flow of the river Bahr Aouk at hydrological station of Golongosso (in m³ / s )
(Calculated using the data for a period of 22 years, 1952–74)
