= Tiri =

Tiri may refer to:

== Places ==
- Tiri, Azerbaijan
- Tiri, Central African Republic
- Tiri, Estonia
- Tiri, Lebanon

== People ==
- Max Tiri, Papua New Guinean rugby league player
- Tiri Toa, Cook Islander professional rugby league player
- Tiri (footballer) (born 1991), Spanish footballer

== Other ==
- Tîrî language, an Oceanic language spoken in New Caledonia
- Tiri Monastery, in Georgia/South Ossetia

== See also ==
- m.v. Tiri, a radio ship once used by offshore broadcaster Radio Hauraki off New Zealand
