= Doum =

Doum may refer to:

- Doum, Central African Republic
- Doum Doum, Chad
- Hyphaene thebaica or doum palm, a type of palm tree

== See also ==
- Douma (disambiguation)
- Doums
