= Berbérati Airport =

- IATA: BBT; ICAO: FEFT

Summary
- Airport type: Public
- Location: Berbérati, Central African Republic
- Elevation AMSL: 1,929 ft / 588 m
- Coordinates: 4°13′20″N 15°47′10″E

Map
- Location of airport in Central African Republic

Runways
Direction	Length		Surface
Direction	m	ft	Surface
17/35	1,510	4,954	Asphalt
- Source: WAD GCM SkyVector

Berbérati Airport (IATA: BBT, ICAO: FEFT) is an airport serving Berbérati, the capital of the Mambéré-Kadéï prefecture in the Central African Republic.

== Facilities ==
The airport is 2 kilometres (1.2 mi) south of Berbérati. The runway has a short (less than 90 metres (300 ft)) paved overrun on each end.

The Berberati VOR (Ident: BT) is located on the field.

== See also ==
- Transport in the Central African Republic
- List of airports in the Central African Republic
