= Dédé-Makouba =

- sub-prefectures
- Location in Central African Republic
- Coordinates: 3°56′00″N 15°14′30″E
- Country: Central African Republic

Government
  - Sub-Prefect: Hervé Yanande

Dédé-Makouba is a sub-prefecture in the Central African Republic.

== History ==
In 2002, the locality becomes chief town of one of the seven sub-prefectures of Mambéré-Kadeï, resulting from a division of the sub-prefecture of Gamboula.

== Administration ==
The sub-prefecture consists of the only commune of Upper Kadéï . The locality of Dédé Makouba counts 7 650 inhabitants in September 2014, including 350 displaced persons.
