= Sosso-Nakombo =

- sub-prefectures
- Location in Central African Republic
- Country: Central African Republic

Government
  - Sub-prefect: Wilson Ulrich Ephrem Moussa Yakoro

Sosso-Nakombo is a sub-prefecture in the Central African Republic.

== History ==
In 1920, after the return to France of Neukamerun, Sosso became chief town of subdivision in the district of Kade-Sangha (Middle Congo). In 2002, the locality becomes chief town of one of the seven sub-prefectures of Mambéré-Kadeï, resulting from a division of the sub-prefecture of Gamboula.

== Administration ==
The sub-prefecture consists of the only municipality of Lower Kadéï. The locality of Sosso-Nakombo has 8,900 inhabitants in September 2014, including 100 displaced persons.
