= Chari River =

River in Central Africa

Chari
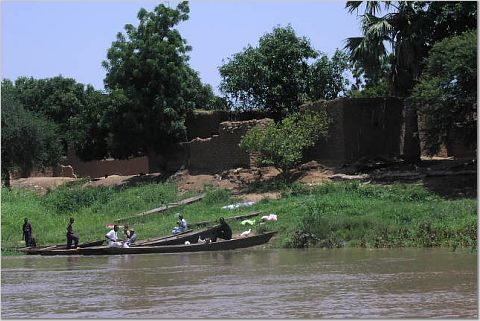

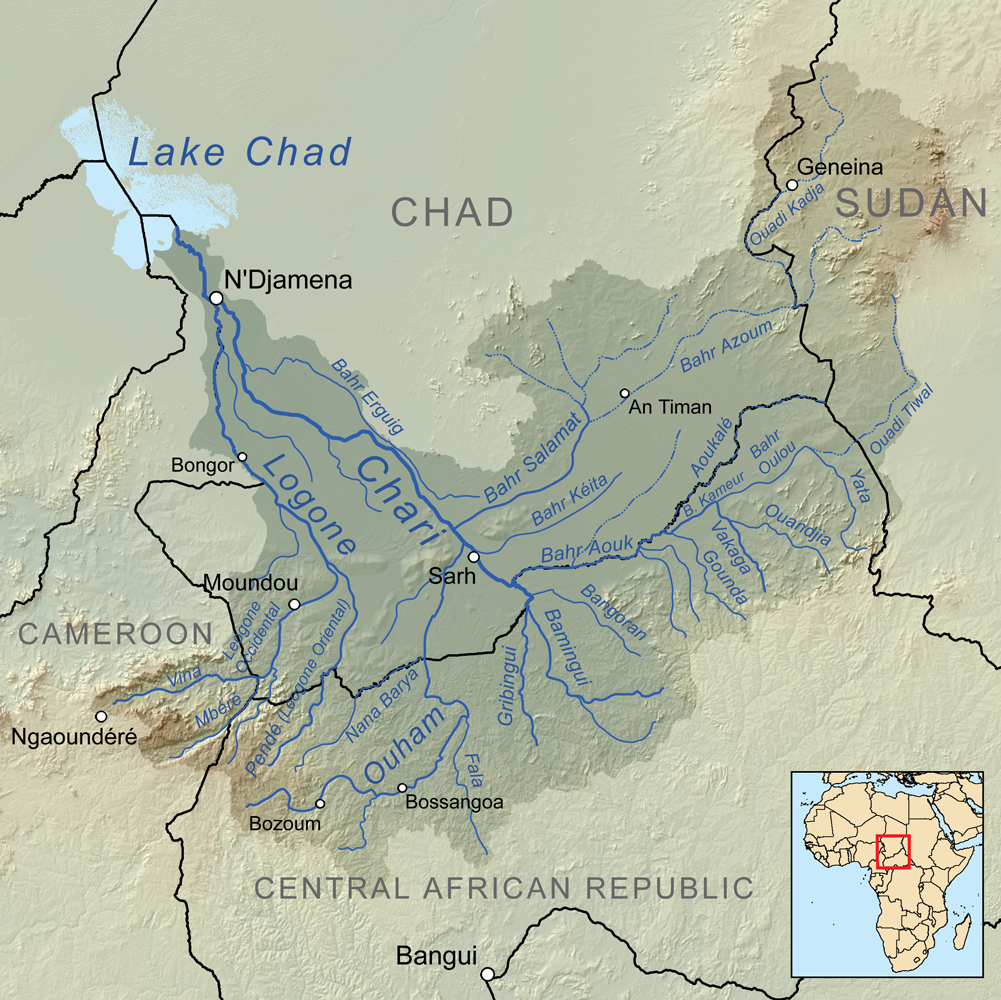
- Map showing the Chari River drainage basin.

Location
- Countries: Central African Republic, Chad, Cameroon

Physical characteristics
- Source: Bamingui
  - location: Mbolo, Central African Republic
  - coordinates: 7°22′55″N 20°57′47″E
  - elevation: 549 m (1,801 ft)
- 2nd source: Gribingui
  - location: Mbrès, Central African Republic
  - coordinates: 6°40′23″N 19°49′55″E
  - elevation: 631 m (2,070 ft)
- Mouth: Lake Chad
  - location: Kinziyakeu, Cameroon
  - coordinates: 12°58′41″N 14°30′43″E
  - elevation: 281 m (922 ft)
- Length: 1,400 km (870 mi)
- Basin size: 548,747 km^{2} (211,872 mi^{2})
- Discharge
  - location: N'djamena
  - average: 1059 m^{3}/s
  - minimum: 8 m^{3}/s
  - maximum: 4846 m^{3}/s

Basin features
- Tributaries
  - left: Logone River

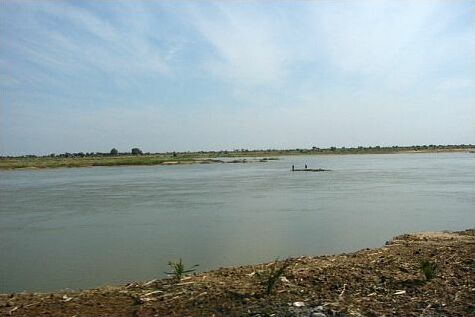
Chari River

The Chari River, or Shari River, is a 1,400 kilometres (870 mi) long river, flowing in Central Africa. It is the main source of water of Lake Chad, which is located at the junction of four countries: Nigeria, Niger, Chad, and Cameroon.

== Geography ==
The Chari River flows from the Central African Republic through Chad into Lake Chad, following the Cameroon border from N'Djamena, where it is joined by its western and principal tributary, the Logone River.

It provides 90 percent of the water flowing into Lake Chad. The watershed of the river covers 548,747 square kilometres (211,872 mi^{2}). The principal tributary is the Logone River, while minor tributaries include the Bahr Salamat, Bahr Sah, Bahr Aouk and Bahr Kéita.

Much of Chad's population, including Sarh and the capital N'Djamena, is concentrated around it.

As of 2016, Chad remains one of four countries where Guinea worm disease remains endemic. The majority of remaining cases are concentrated around the Chari River.

The river supports an important local fishing industry. One of the most highly prized local fish is the Nile perch.

Since the 1960s, there have been proposals to divert water from the Ubangi River to the Chari to revitalize Lake Chad, which would constitute a reversal of the capture of the upper Ubangi from the Chari by the Congo River that is believed to have occurred in the early Pleistocene.

== History ==
The Sao people are said to have lived by this river.

The Chari River basin has been populated by diverse speakers of the Chadic languages, Adamawa languages, Ubangian languages, Bongo-Bagirmi languages.

== See also ==
- Oubangui-Chari
- Chari–Baguirmi Region
- Moyen-Chari Region
- Chari–Nile languages
- Chari River topics
- Lake Chad topics
- Lake Chad replenishment project
- Waterway
