= Gamboula =

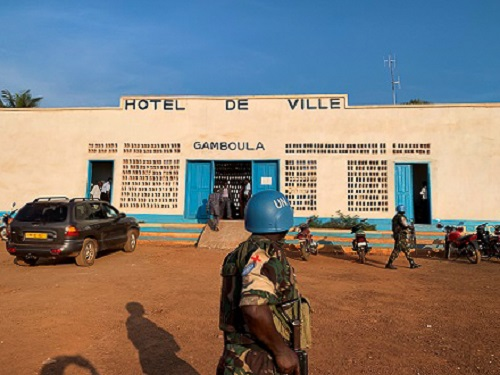
- Gamboula Town Hall

- Location in Central African Republic
- Coordinates: 4°8′N 15°09′E
- Country: Central African Republic
- Prefecture: Mambéré-Kadéï

Government
  - Sub-prefect: Paul Makemba

Population (2003)
  - Total: 13,048

Gamboula is a town located in the Central African Republic prefecture of Mambéré-Kadéï, near the border of Cameroon.

== History ==
On 28 December 2020, Gamboula was captured by rebels from Coalition of Patriots for Change. It was recaptured by government forces on 7 March 2021.
