= Bamingui-Bangoran =

Prefecture of the Central African Republic

Coordinates: 8°25′N 20°40′E

- Prefecture
- Bamingui-Bangoran in the Central African Republic

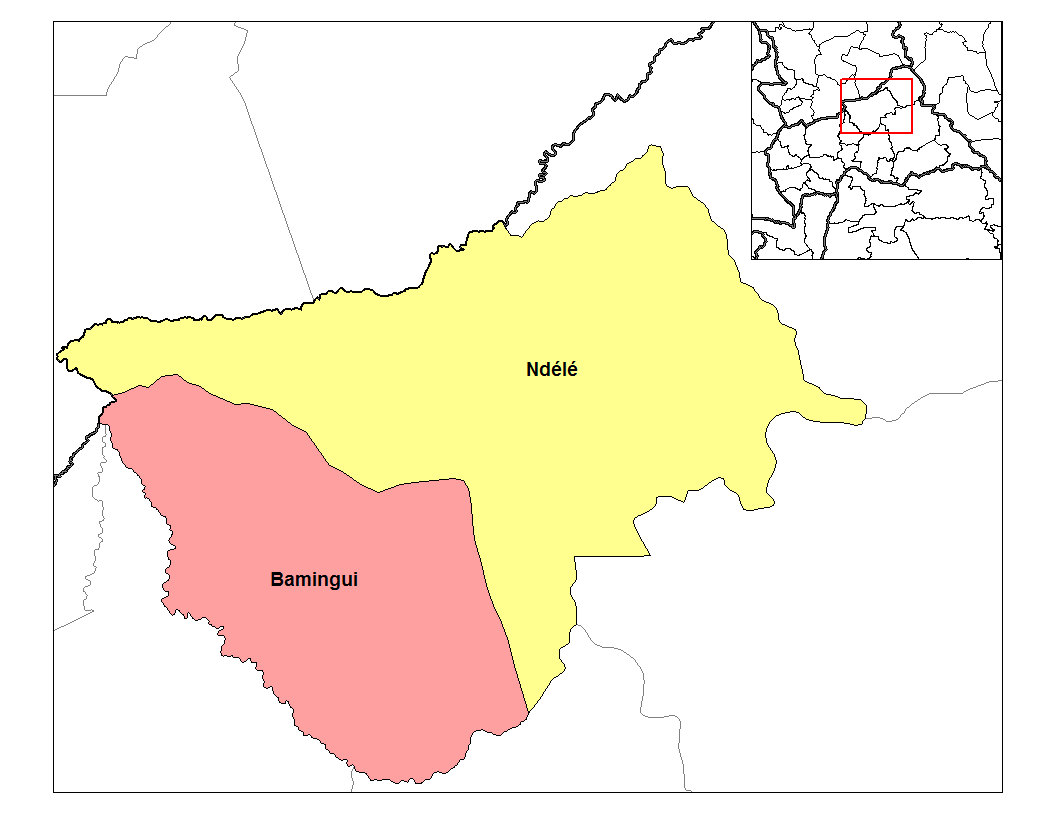
- Sub-prefectures of Bamingui-Bangoran
- Country: Central African Republic
- Capital: N'Délé

Government
  - Prefect: Francis Bangue-Doungoupo

Area
  - Total: 58,200 km^{2} (22,500 sq mi)

Population (2003 census)
  - Total: 43,229
  - Estimate (2024 estimation): 85,472

Bamingui-Bangoran is one of the 20 prefectures of the Central African Republic. It covers an area of 58,200 km^{2} and had a population of 43,229 as of the 2003 census. The capital is Ndélé. In 2024, official estimates suggest the population reached 85,472 inhabitants.

The Bamingui-Bangoran National Park and Biosphere Reserve is in the prefecture.

== Sub-prefectures ==
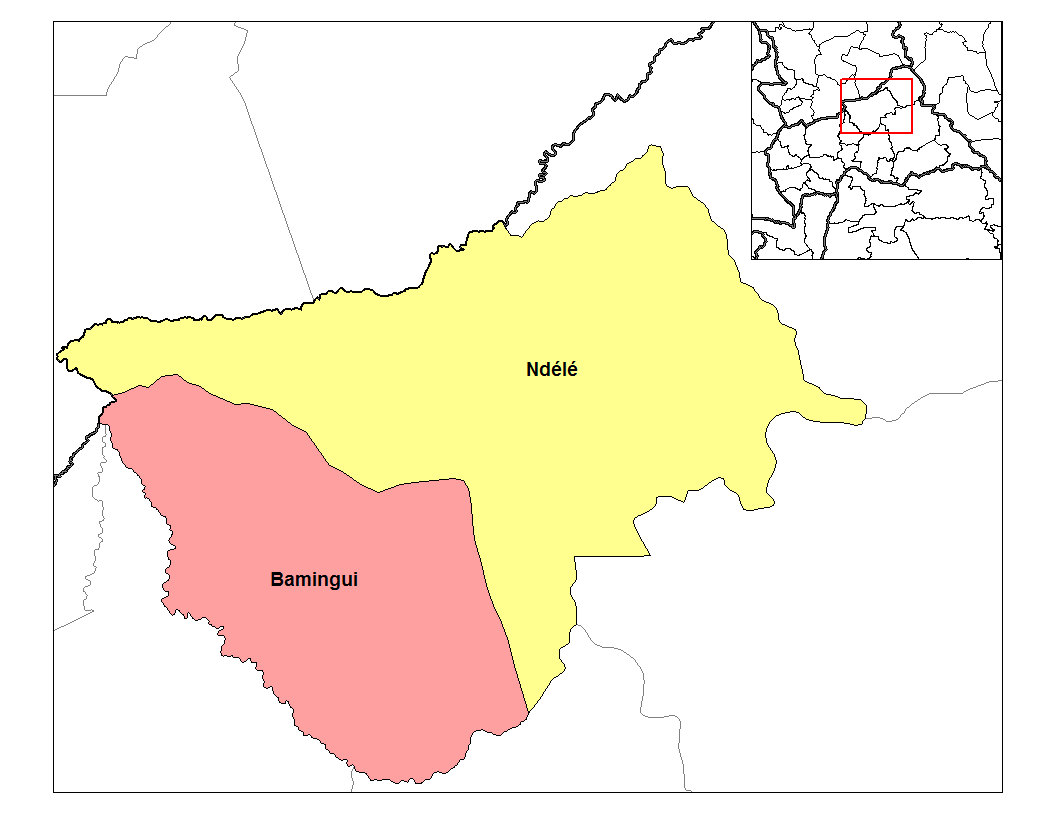
Sub-prefectures of Bamingui-Bangoran

- Bamingui
- Ndélé

== Bamingui ==
=== Towns and villages ===
- Balouba
- Bamingui
- Bangoran
- Bingou
- Boufoura
- Boumbala
- Dangavo
- Digba
- Elle
- Kaga Nze
- Kaka
- Koutessako
- Kovongo Mia
- Maikaba
- Ngoussoua
- Nianga Bitibanda
- Niango Amane
- Vata
- Yombo

== Ndele ==
=== Towns and villages ===
- Akourousoulba
- Aliou
- Bangbali
- Bir-Batouma Moussa
- Botedjo
- Boul-Kinia
- Demi Batchi
- Diki
- Djabossinda
- Djamassinda
- Dongo
- Doum
- Gaita Mainda
- Galo
- Garba
- Golongoso
- Gounda
- Goz Amar
- Goz Beida
- Idongo
- Kilibiti
- Kori
- Koundi
- Koutchikako
- Kouyara
- Kpakpale
- Krakoma
- Lemena
- Lokotoumala
- Manga
- Mbolo
- Mbolo Abetlanga
- Miamere
- Mindou
- N'Délé
- Ngoudjaka
- Njoko
- Ouihi
- Pata
- Takara
- Tiri
- Zoukoutouniala
