= Mambéré-Kadéï =

Prefecture of the Central African Republic

Mambéré-Kadéi
- Prefecture
- Mambéré-Kadéi in the Central African Republic

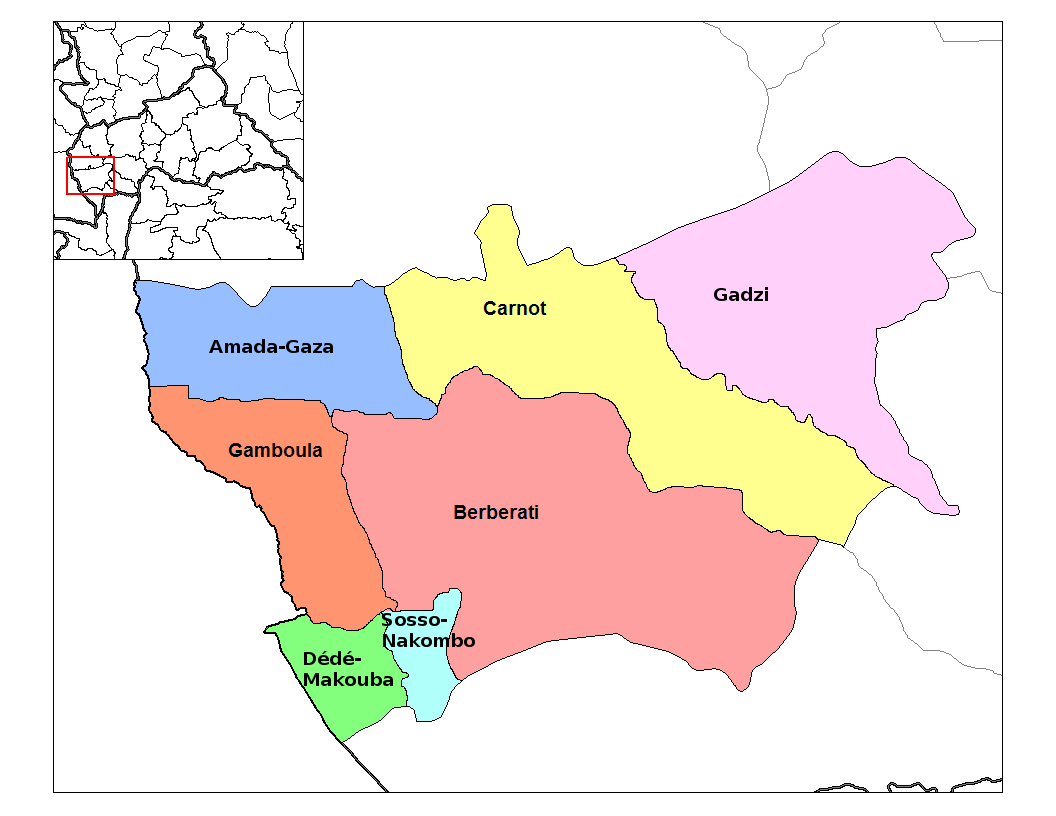
- Sub-prefectures of Mambéré-Kadéi before Dec. 2020
- Coordinates: 4°30′N 16°00′E
- Country: Central African Republic
- Capital: Berbérati

Government
  - Prefect: Theodore Papillon Malengue

Area
  - Total: 13,740 km^{2} (5,310 sq mi)

Population (2003 census)
  - Total: 364,795
  - Estimate (2024 estimation): 281,286

Mambéré-Kadéï [mɑ̃.be.ʁe ka.de.i] is one of the 20 prefectures of the Central African Republic. Its capital is Berbérati. It is named for the Mambéré River and Kadéï River. The prefecture covers an area of 13,740 km^{2} and, according to official estimates, its population was 281,286 inhabitants in 2024. At the time of the country's last official census, in 2003, the population was 364,795 inhabitants in an area of 30,203 km^{2}. These are data from before December 2020, when part of the territory was dismembered to create the Mambéré prefecture.

Until 1992, it was known as Haute-Sangha.

== Sub-prefectures ==
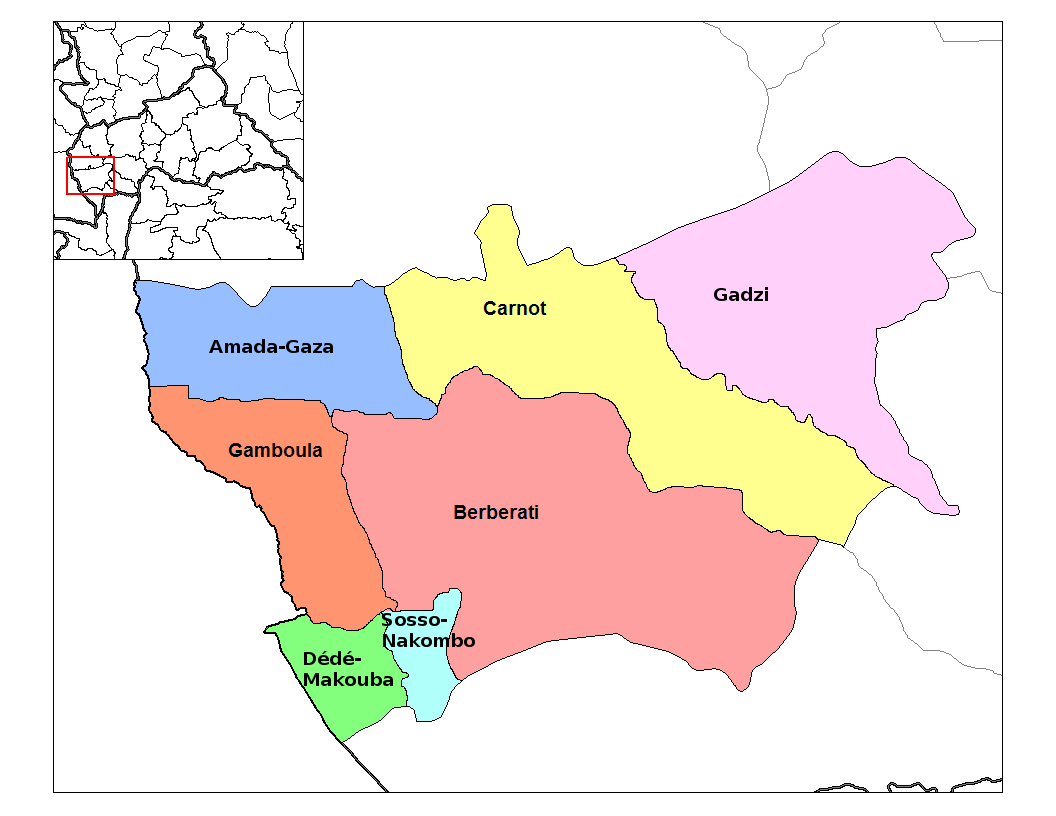
Sub-prefectures of Mambere-Kadei

- Berbérati
- Gamboula
- Dédé-Makouba
- Sosso-Nakombo
