= Berbérati =

- City
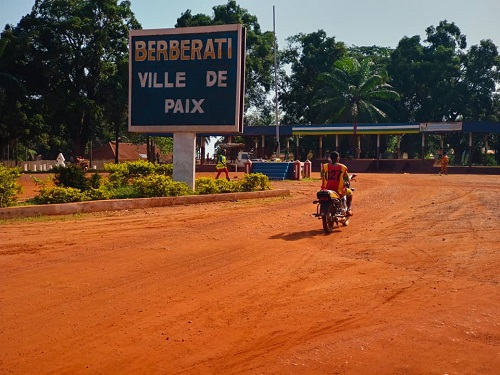
- Berberati roundabout in 2023

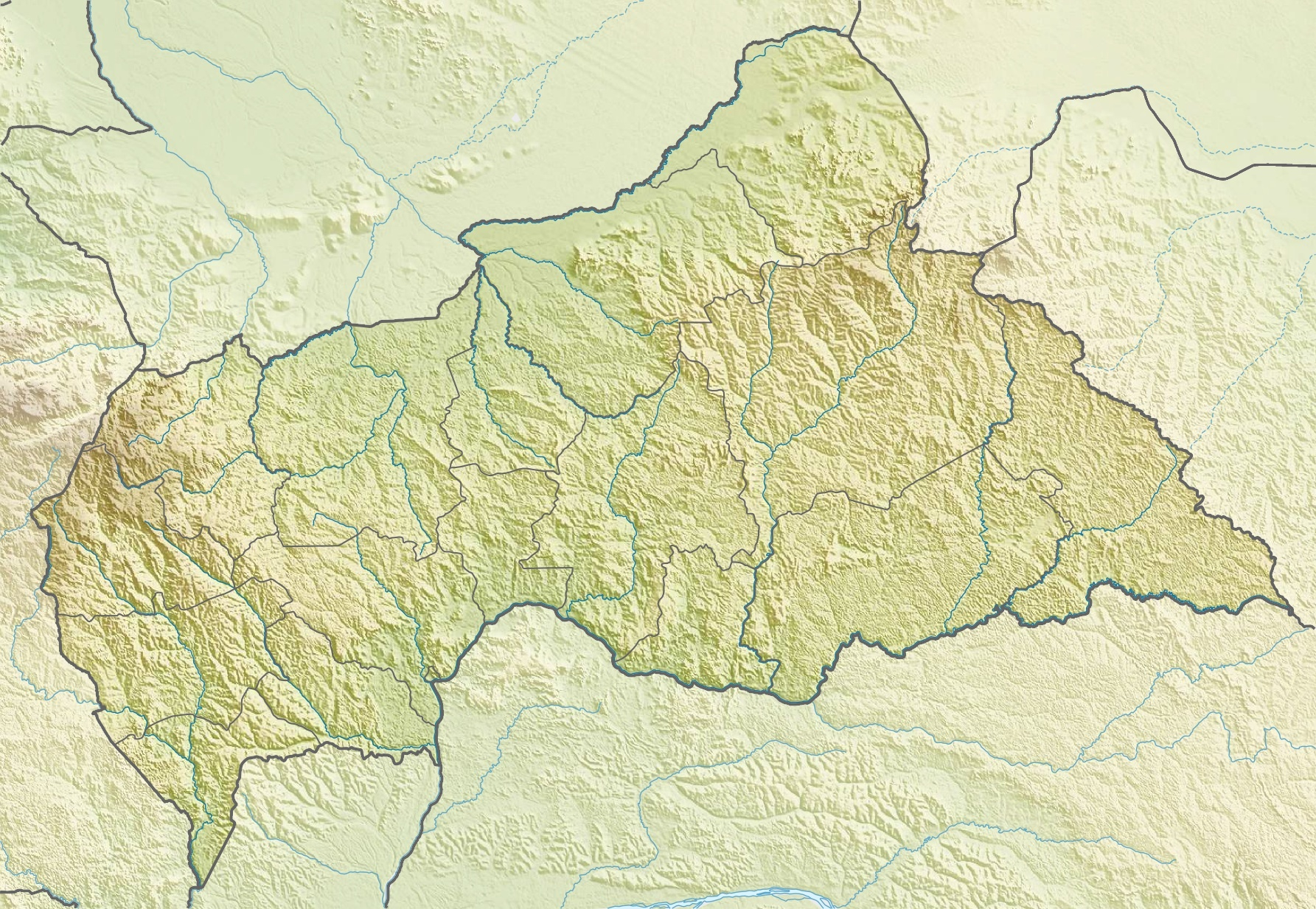
- Location in the Central African Republic
- Coordinates: 4°15′41″N 15°47′22″E
- Country: Central African Republic
- Prefecture: Mambéré-Kadéï
- Sub-prefecture: Berbérati

Government
  - Sub-prefect: Jacques Antoine Gounindji
  - Mayor: Thérèse Sekpe

Area
  - Total: 67 km^{2} (26 sq mi)
- Elevation: 589 m (1,932 ft)

Population (2012)
  - Total: 105,155
  - Density: 1,600/km^{2} (4,100/sq mi)
- Time zone: UTC+01:00 (WAT)

Berbérati is the third-largest city in the Central African Republic, with a population of 105,155 (2013 census). Located in the south-west of the country, near the border with Cameroon, it serves as capital of the Mambéré-Kadéï Prefecture and the Berbérati sub-prefecture.

== History ==
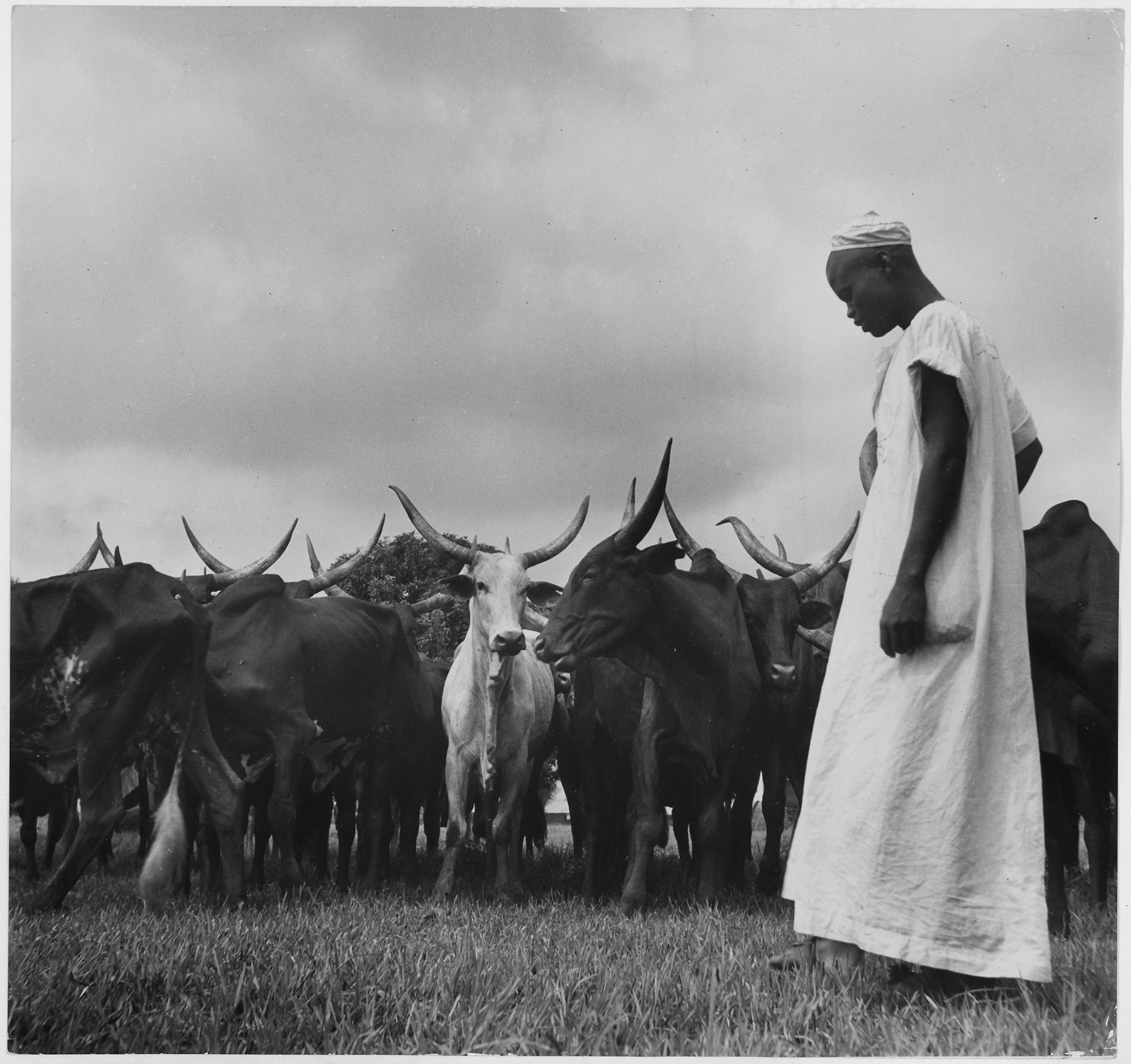
The zebu herd (oxen) arrive at Compagnie Miniere de l' Oubanghi headquarters in Berberati, a little weary and thin after the 260 kilometer hike. ca. 1950

The city was founded in 1893. In the early 20th century Berbérati was part of Oubangui-Chari, one of the four territories comprising French Equatorial Africa. In 1911 it was ceded to the German Empire under the terms of the Morocco–Congo Treaty and the Treaty of Fez, becoming part of the German colony of Neukamerun, until it was reconquered by the French in 1916 following the defeat of German forces in western Africa during World War I.

== Health ==
The state-owned university hospital of Berbérati is an unfenced complex of several bungalows near the town center. The hospital was constructed in the 1950s and operated by French military doctors until the 1980s. The French hospital administrators were succeeded by an expatriate Italian Catholic nun, although the hospital also receives Protestant support.

== Transports ==
Berbérati is served by the Berbérati Airport.

== Climate ==
Köppen-Geiger climate classification system classifies Berbérati’s climate as tropical savanna (Aw).

Climate data for Berbérati (1991–2020)
Month	Jan	Feb	Mar	Apr	May	Jun	Jul	Aug	Sep	Oct	Nov	Dec	Year
Mean daily maximum °C (°F)	32.2 (90.0)	33.7 (92.7)	32.9 (91.2)	32.2 (90.0)	31.2 (88.2)	29.8 (85.6)	28.9 (84.0)	28.8 (83.8)	29.7 (85.5)	29.9 (85.8)	31.0 (87.8)	31.5 (88.7)	31.0 (87.8)
Daily mean °C (°F)	24.5 (76.1)	26.1 (79.0)	26.6 (79.9)	26.2 (79.2)	25.6 (78.1)	24.8 (76.6)	24.1 (75.4)	24.4 (75.9)	24.5 (76.1)	24.7 (76.5)	25.0 (77.0)	24.5 (76.1)	25.1 (77.2)
Mean daily minimum °C (°F)	16.9 (62.4)	18.7 (65.7)	20.3 (68.5)	20.5 (68.9)	20.1 (68.2)	19.7 (67.5)	18.8 (65.8)	19.7 (67.5)	19.3 (66.7)	19.6 (67.3)	19.1 (66.4)	17.6 (63.7)	19.2 (66.6)
Average precipitation mm (inches)	11.6 (0.46)	36.7 (1.44)	90.5 (3.56)	138.8 (5.46)	175.1 (6.89)	165.7 (6.52)	193.0 (7.60)	193.4 (7.61)	246.1 (9.69)	249.4 (9.82)	100.5 (3.96)	16.3 (0.64)	1,617 (63.66)
Average precipitation days (≥ 1.0 mm)	1.2	2.2	6.8	9.8	11.9	10.9	12.9	12.3	15.2	17.9	8.7	1.7	111.1
Average relative humidity (%) (daily average)	65.6	64.5	71.9	76.5	79.0	81.5	82.4	82.6	81.4	80.9	78.6	71.7	76.4
Mean monthly sunshine hours	244.9	199.3	206.7	206.7	200.5	168.6	148.1	142.5	174.5	198.9	247.2	251.6	2,389.5
Source: NOAA

== Places of worship ==
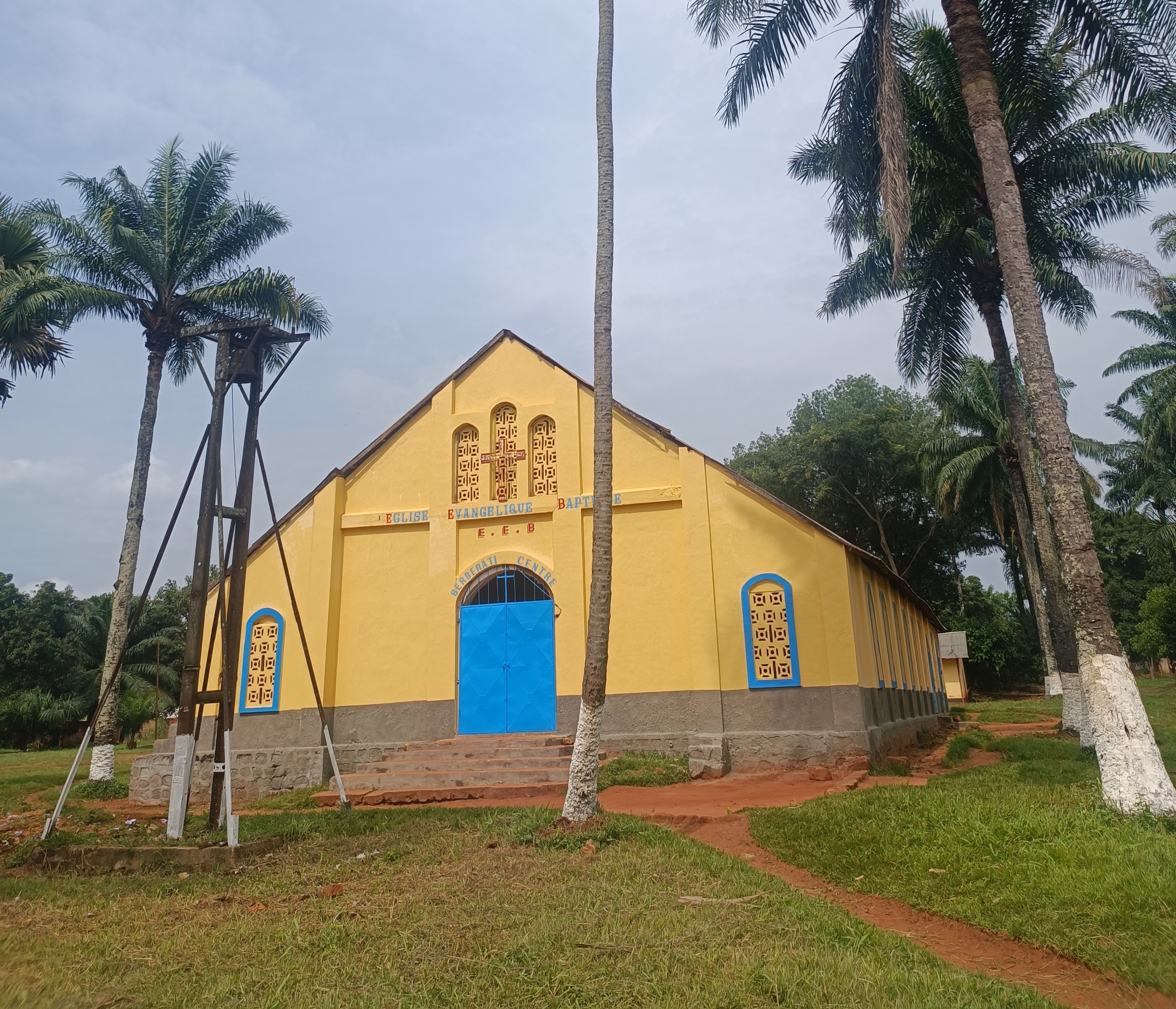
Evangelical Baptist Church of Berbérati

Places of worship in Berbérati are predominantly Christian churches and temples: Evangelical Lutheran Church of the Central African Republic (Lutheran World Federation), Evangelical Baptist Church of the Central African Republic (Baptist World Alliance), Roman Catholic Diocese of Berbérati (Catholic Church). There are also Muslim mosques.

== Gallery ==
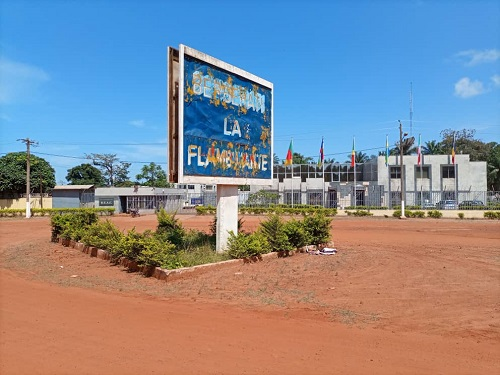
Berberati town center crossing

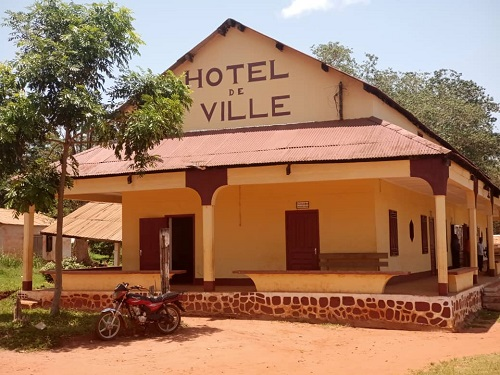
Berberati town hall

== See also ==
- Dzanga-Sangha Special Reserve
- List of cities in the Central African Republic
- Prefectures of the Central African Republic
