= Bamingui =

Town in Central African Republic

- Location in the Central African Republic
- Coordinates: 7°34′N 20°11′E
- Country: Central African Republic
- Prefecture: Bamingui-Bangoran
- Sub-prefecture: Bamingui

Government
  - Sub-Prefect: Théophile Gandola

Population (2003)
  - Total: 6,230
- Time zone: UTC + 1

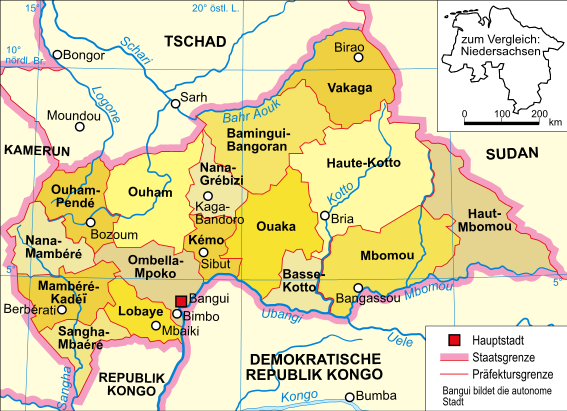

Bamingui is a town and sub-prefecture in the Bamingui-Bangoran Prefecture in the northern Central African Republic. It lies on the south bank of the Chari River (Bamingui River) along National Route 8, 529 kilometres (329 mi) by road northeast of the capital of Bangui. As of 2003 it had a population of 6230 people.

== History ==
When the fighting resumed in December 2012 between the FACA loyalists and the rebel coalition of Séléka, the city fell to rebel forces. On 25 June 2021 it was recaptured by government forces during their offensive against rebels from Coalition of Patriots for Change.
