= N'Délé =

- Location in Central African Republic
- Coordinates: 8°24′33″N 20°39′11″E
- Country: Central African Republic
- Prefecture: Bamingui-Bangoran

Government
  - Sub-Prefect: Dieu Beni Tebefra
  - Sultan: Ibrahim Kamoun Senoussi

Population (2013)
  - Total: 13,704

N'Délé or Ndele is a market town and sub prefecture in the north eastern Central African Republic, lying east of the Bamingui-Bangoran National Park. Ndélé is the capital of Bamingui-Bangoran, one of the 16 prefectures of the Central African Republic. N'Délé had a population of 10,850 as of the 2003 census; and a calculated 2013 population of 13,704.

== History ==
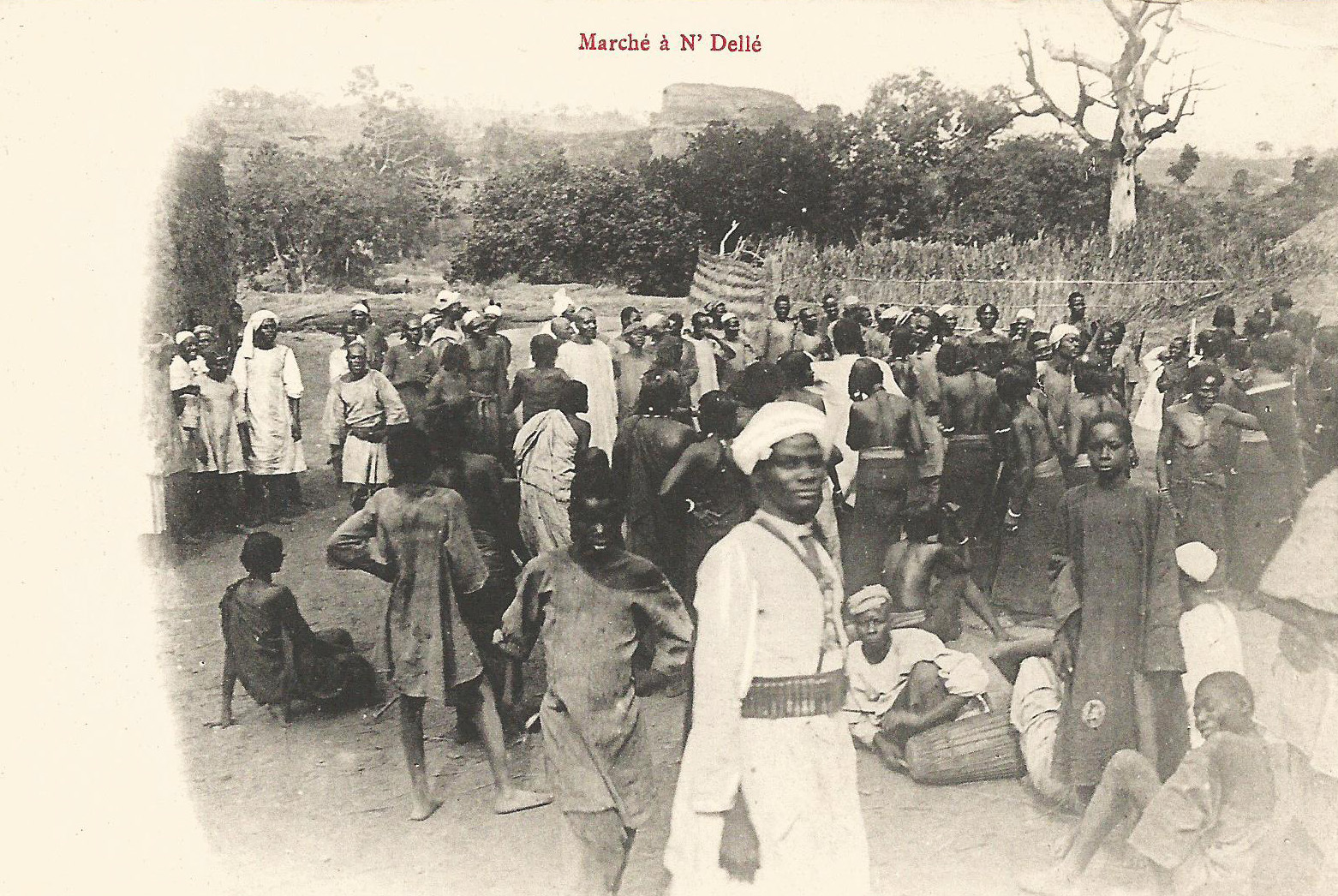
The market at N'Délé during the 19th century.

The tata, or fortified wall, creates a citadel-like palace on a hill overlooking N'Délé. It was constructed at the behest of Sultan Mohammed al-Sanussi of Dar al Kuti in the late 19th century. N'Délé, the tata, and the Kaga-Kpoungouvou Caves were collectively added to the UNESCO World Heritage Tentative List on April 11, 2006, in the Cultural category. In 1970, N'Délé received electricity.

When the fighting resumed in December 2012 between the FACA loyalists and the rebel coalition of Séléka, the city fell to rebel forces. In 2020 heavy clashes erupted in the city between ex-Séléka FPRC and RPRC groups resulting in dozens of people being killed. On 27 June 2021, N'Délé was recaptured by government forces.

== Climate ==
N'Délé has a tropical savanna climate (Köppen climate classification Aw) with a sweltering and arid dry season from November to mid-April and a hot and humid wet season – milder than the dry season by temperature but equally or more uncomfortable due to much higher humidity – from mid-April to the end of October.

Climate data for N'Délé
| Month | Jan | Feb | Mar | Apr | May | Jun | Jul | Aug | Sep | Oct | Nov | Dec | Year |
|---|---|---|---|---|---|---|---|---|---|---|---|---|---|
| Mean daily maximum °C (°F) | 36.5 (97.7) | 37.8 (100.0) | 38.5 (101.3) | 37.0 (98.6) | 34.6 (94.3) | 31.8 (89.2) | 30.4 (86.7) | 29.4 (84.9) | 30.5 (86.9) | 31.7 (89.1) | 33.3 (91.9) | 34.7 (94.5) | 33.9 (92.9) |
| Daily mean °C (°F) | 27.2 (81.0) | 29.4 (84.9) | 30.1 (86.2) | 30.0 (86.0) | 28.6 (83.5) | 26.7 (80.1) | 25.4 (77.7) | 25.4 (77.7) | 25.4 (77.7) | 25.9 (78.6) | 25.8 (78.4) | 25.1 (77.2) | 27.1 (80.8) |
| Mean daily minimum °C (°F) | 18.0 (64.4) | 20.7 (69.3) | 21.3 (70.3) | 22.9 (73.2) | 22.6 (72.7) | 21.2 (70.2) | 20.7 (69.3) | 21.3 (70.3) | 20.4 (68.7) | 20.1 (68.2) | 18.5 (65.3) | 16.2 (61.2) | 20.3 (68.6) |
| Average rainfall mm (inches) | 0 (0) | 6 (0.2) | 24 (0.9) | 65 (2.6) | 122 (4.8) | 151 (5.9) | 205 (8.1) | 235 (9.3) | 231 (9.1) | 131 (5.2) | 9 (0.4) | 0 (0) | 1,179 (46.5) |
| Mean monthly sunshine hours | 279 | 263 | 250 | 209 | 222 | 189 | 160 | 151 | 157 | 201 | 277 | 268 | 2,626 |
Source 1: Normales et records pour la période 2002–2013 à N'Dele,
Source 2: Climate : N'Délé for rainfall totals, Étude méthodologique pour l'use des données climatologiques de l'Afrique tropicale for sunshine hours

== Books ==
- D. Cordell, Dar al-Kuti and the Last Years of the Trans-Saharan Slave Trade. Madison: The University of Wisconsin Press, 1985.
