= Sub-prefectures of the Central African Republic =

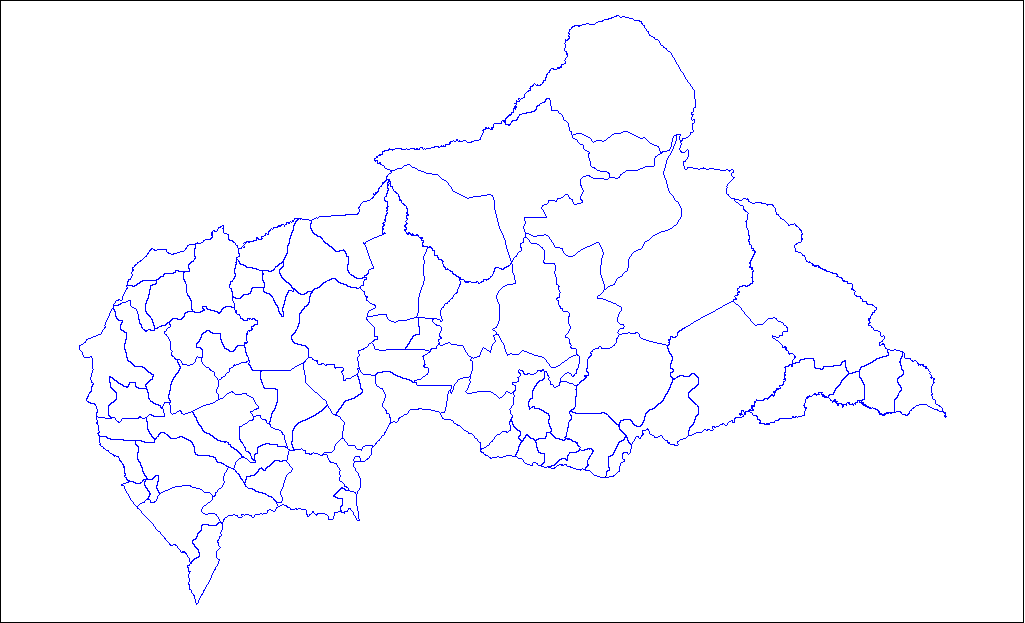
Sub-Prefectures of the Central African Republic

The prefectures of the Central African Republic are divided into 80 sub-prefectures (French: sous-préfectures). The sub-prefectures are listed below, by prefecture.

== Bamingui-Bangoran Prefecture ==
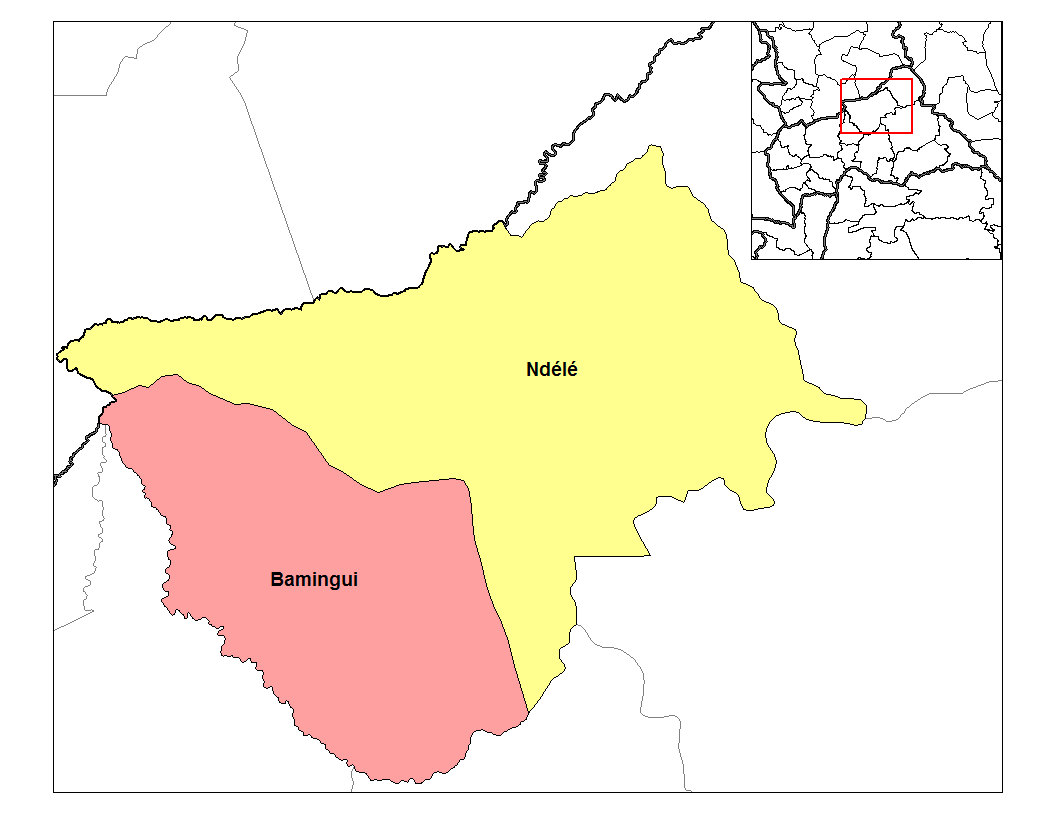
Sub-prefectures of Bamingui-Bangoran

- Bamingui
- Ndélé

== Basse-Kotto Prefecture ==
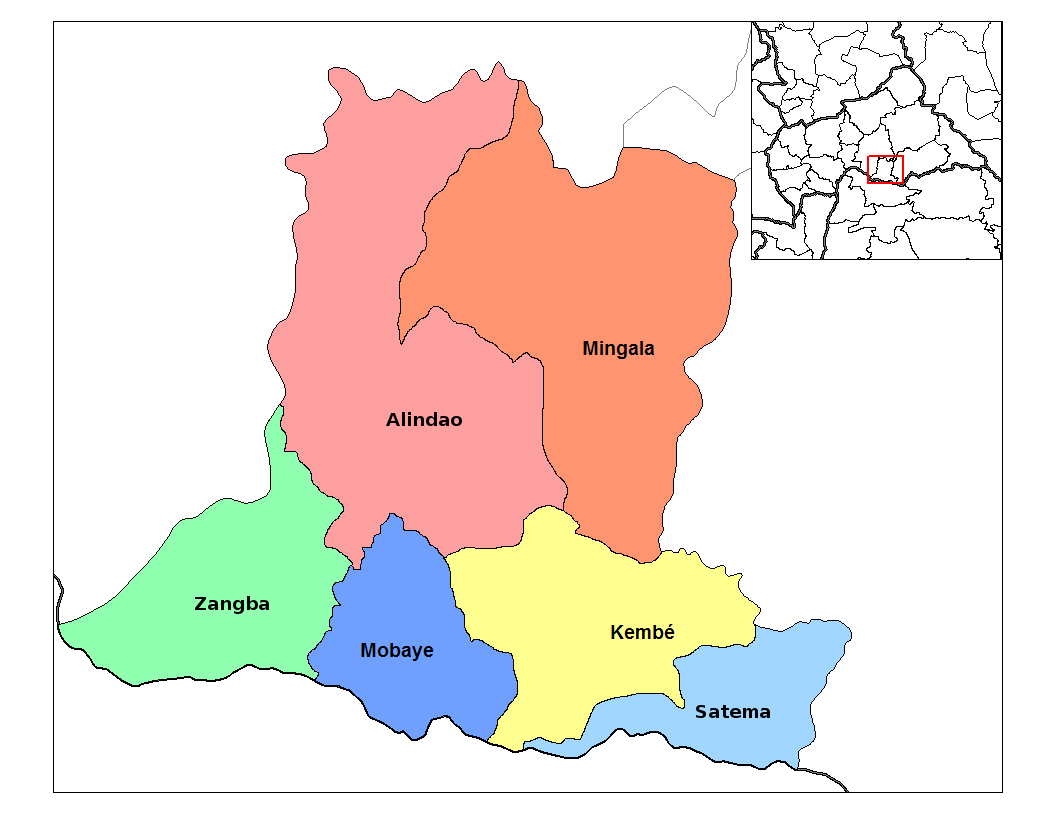
Sub-prefectures of Basse-Kotto

- Alindao
- Kembé
- Mingala
- Mobaye
- Satema
- Zangba

== Haut-Mbomou Prefecture ==
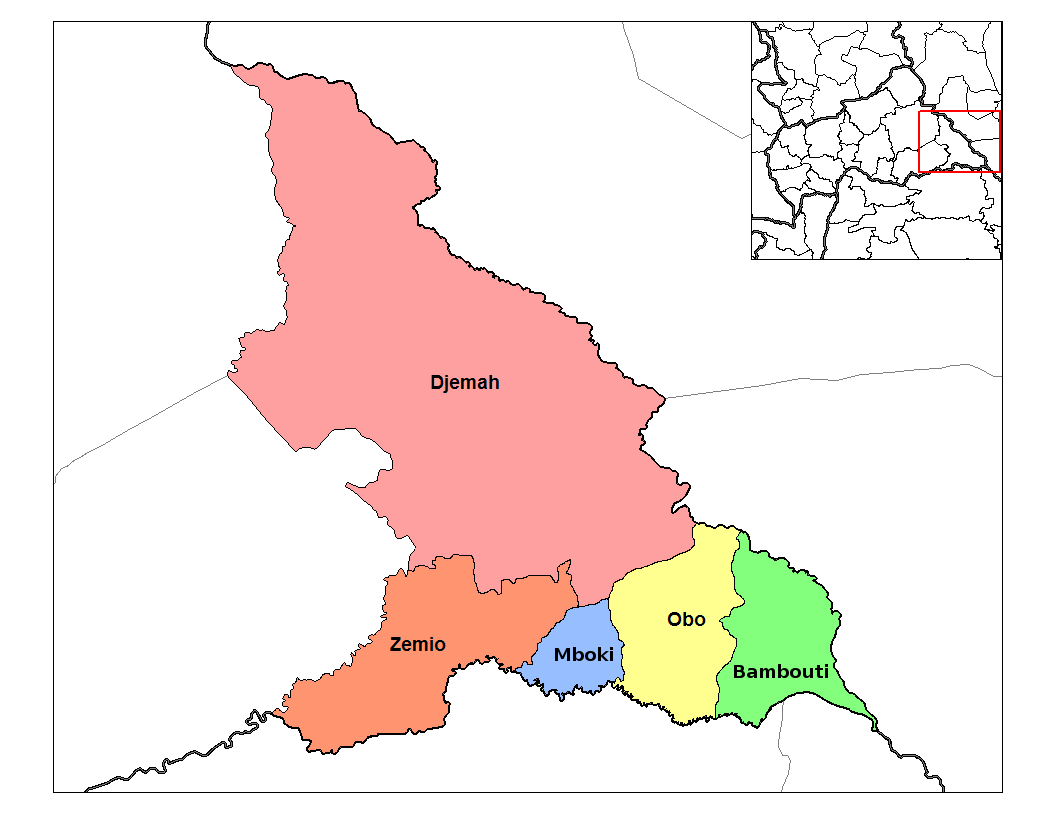
Sub-prefectures of Haut-Mbomou

- Djemah
- Obo
- Zemio
- Bambouti
- Mboki

== Haute-Kotto Prefecture ==
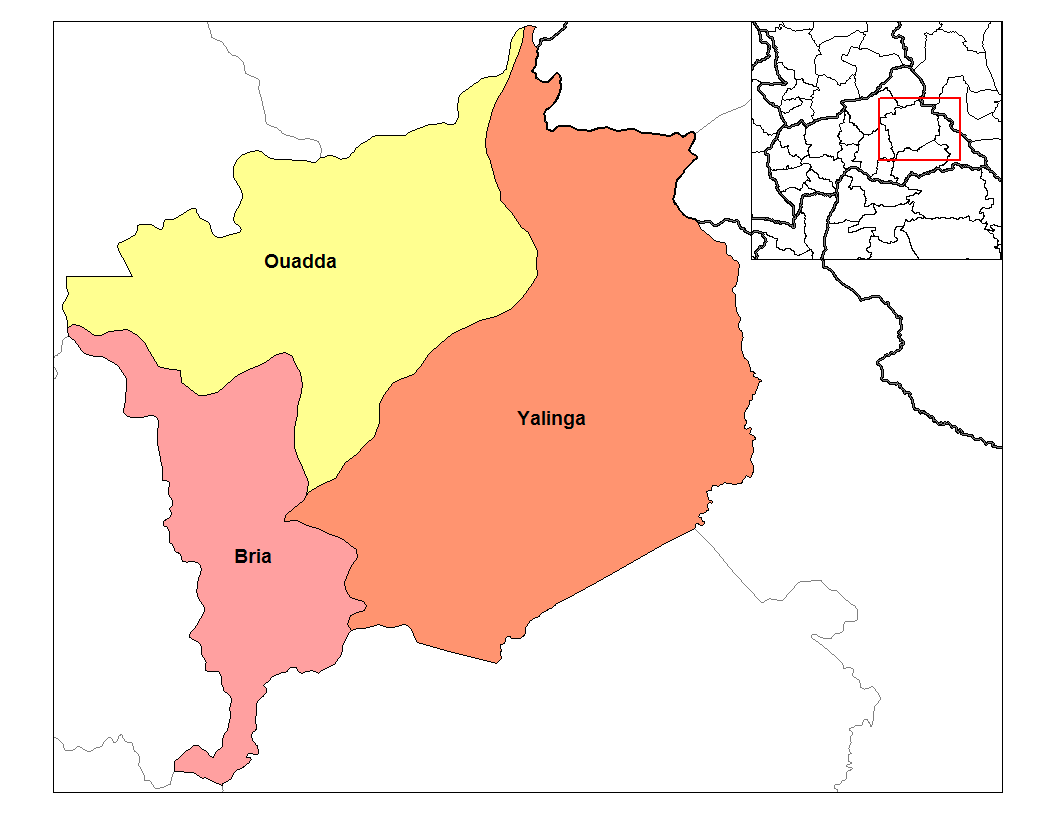
Sub-prefectures of Haute-Kotto

- Bria
- Ouadda
- Yalinga

== Kémo Prefecture ==
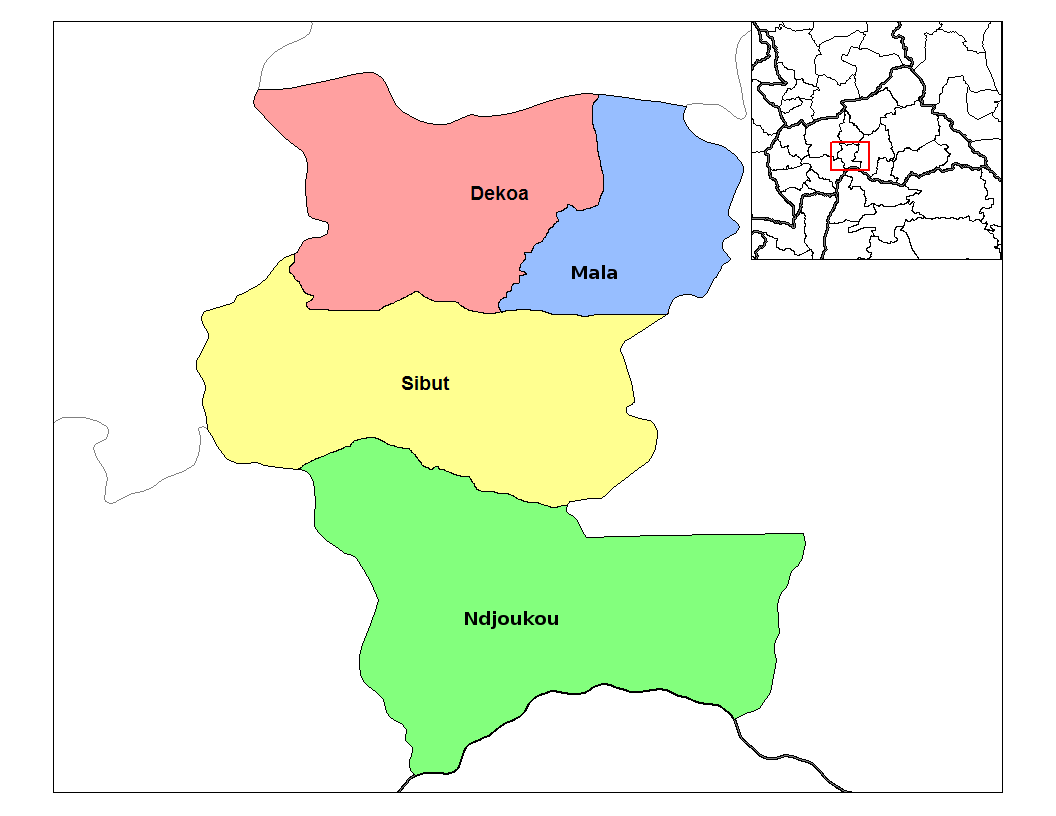
Sub-prefectures of Kemo

- Dekoa
- Sibut
- Mala
- Ndjoukou

== Lobaye Prefecture ==
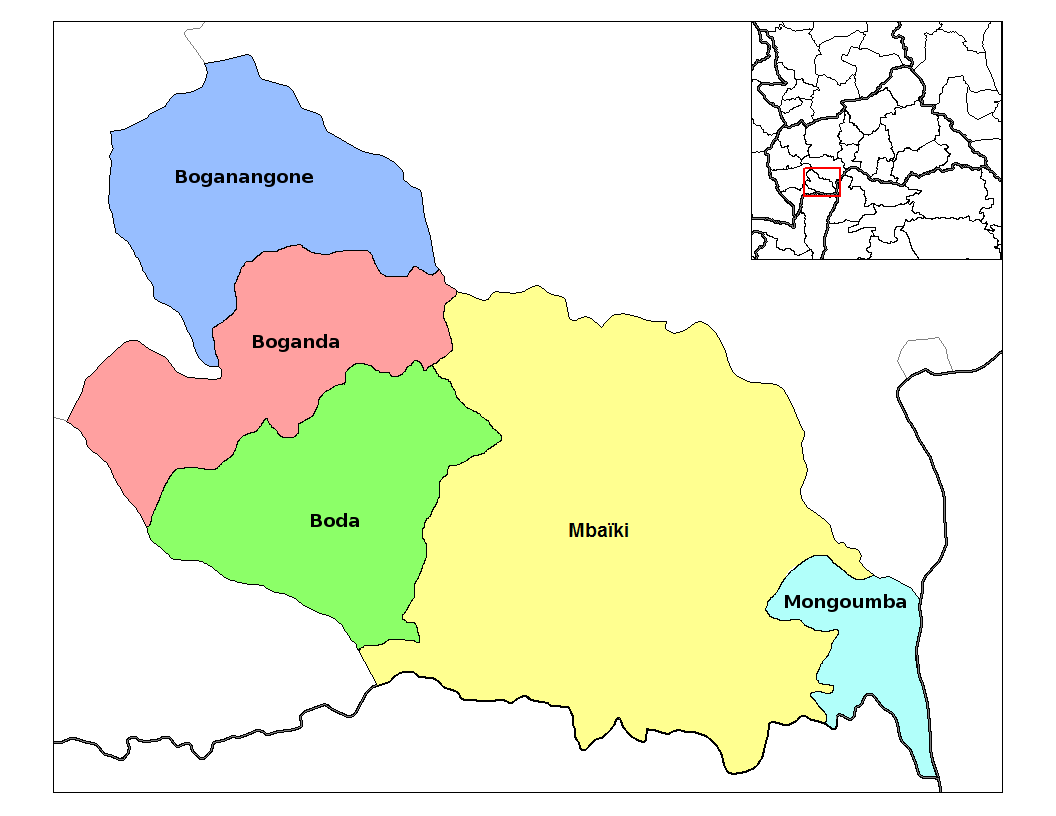
Sub-prefectures of Lobaye

- Boda
- Mbaiki
- Mongoumba
- Boganangone
- Boganda

== Lim-Pendé Prefecture ==
- Paoua
- Ngaoundaye
- Ndim
- Kodi
- Taley

== Mambéré Prefecture ==
- Carnot
- Amada-Gaza
- Gadzi
- Senkpa-Mbaéré

== Mambéré-Kadéï Prefecture ==
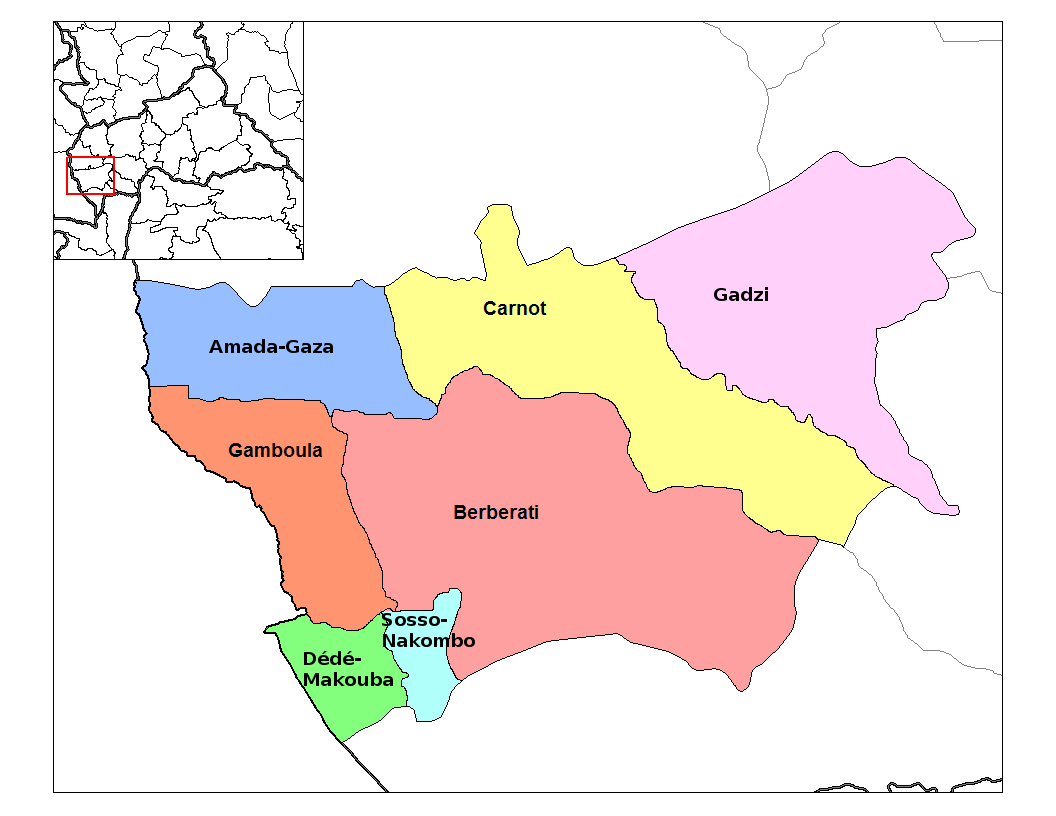
Sub-prefectures of Mambere-Kadei

- Berbérati
- Gamboula
- Dédé-Makouba
- Sosso-Nakombo

== Mbomou Prefecture ==
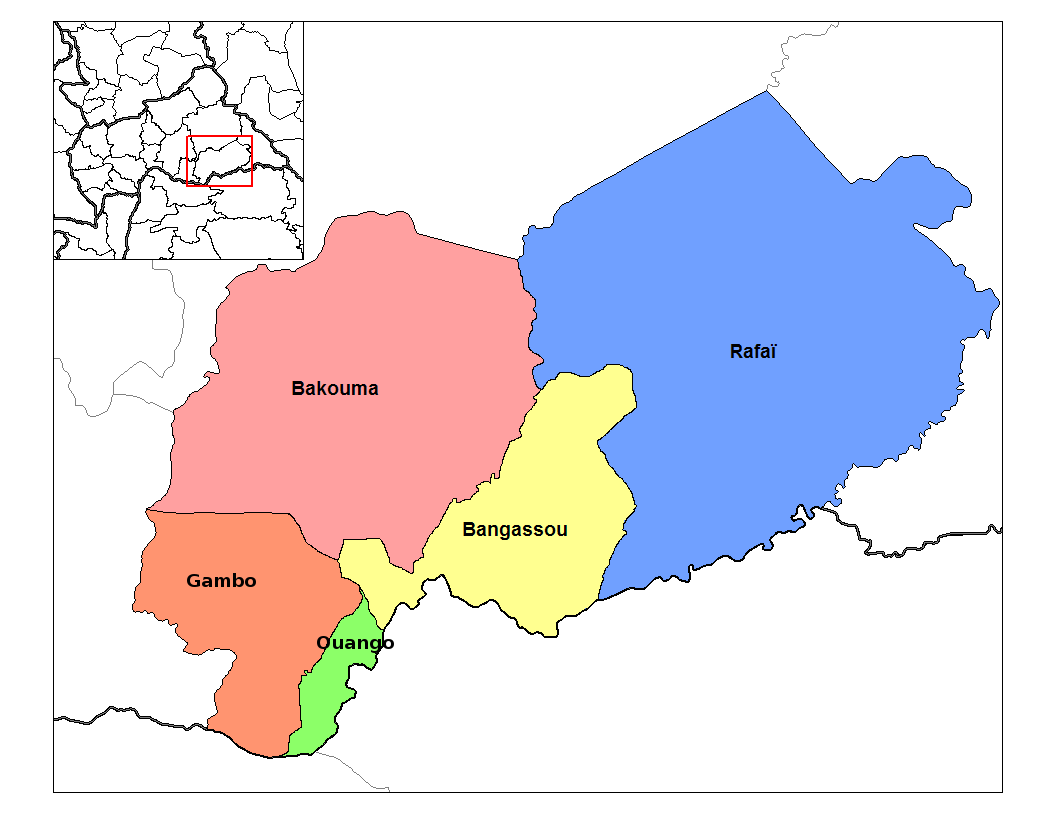
Sub-prefectures of Mbomou

- Bakouma
- Bangassou
- Rafai
- Gambo
- Ouango

== Nana-Grébizi Economic Prefecture ==
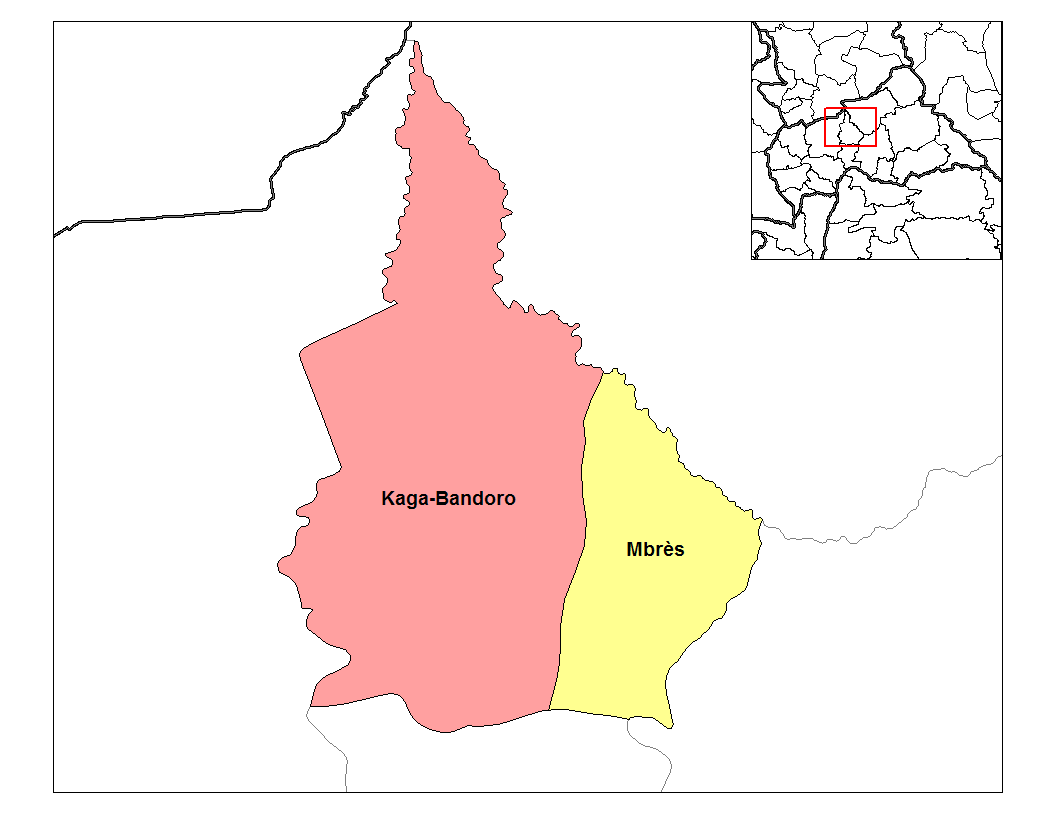
Sub-prefectures of Nana-Grebizi

- Kaga-Bandoro
- Mbrès

== Nana-Mambéré Prefecture ==
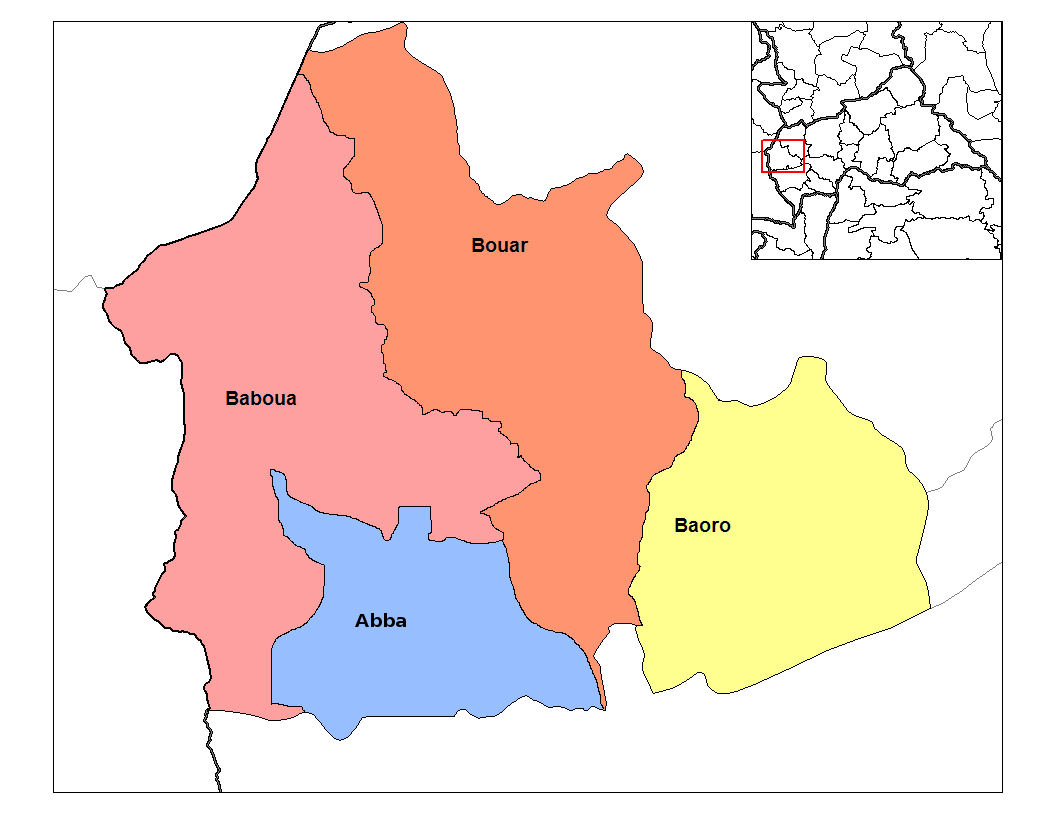
Sub-prefectures of Nana-Mambere

- Baboua
- Baoro
- Bouar
- Abba

== Ombella-M'Poko Prefecture ==
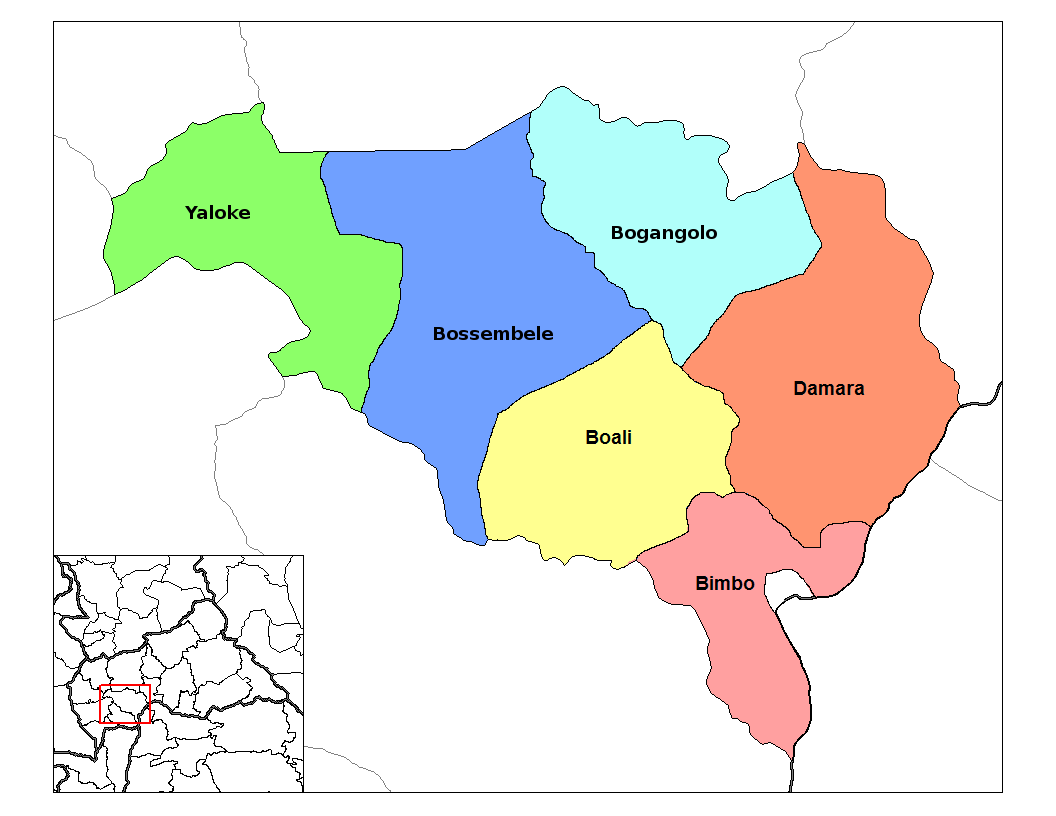
Sub-prefectures of Ombella-M'Poko

- Boali
- Damara
- Bogangolo
- Yaloke
- Bossembele

== Ouaka Prefecture ==
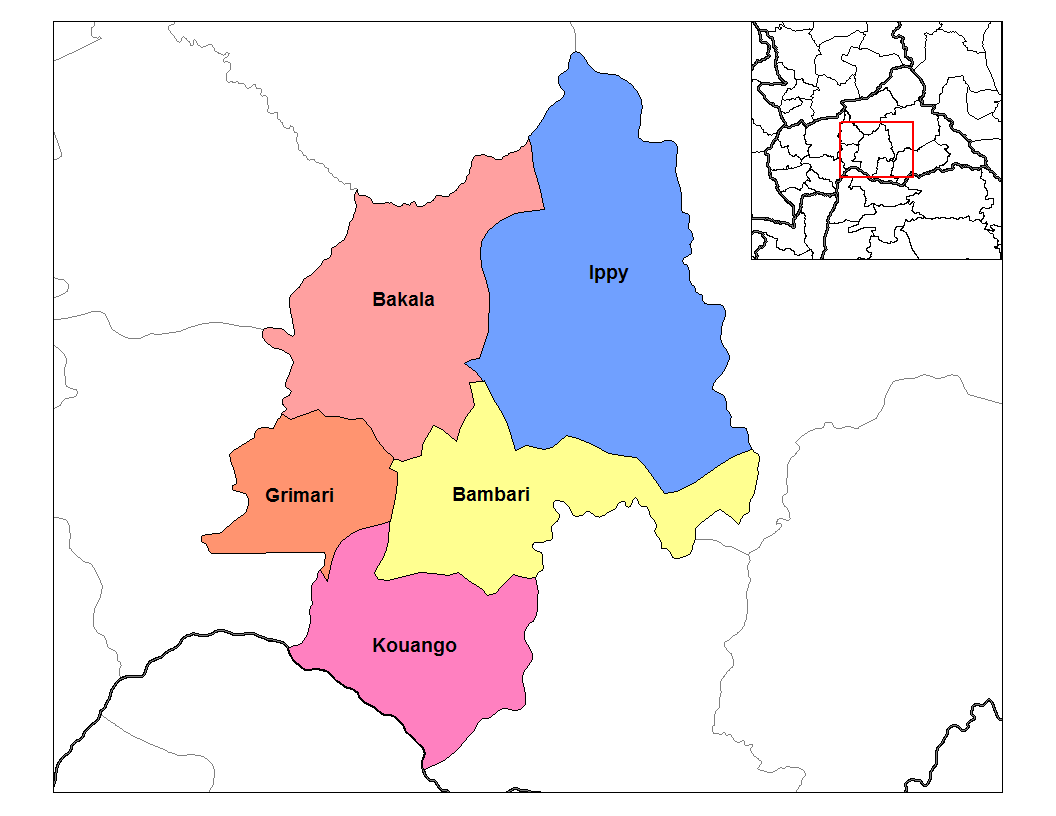
Sub-prefectures of Ouaka

- Bakala
- Bambari
- Grimari
- Ippy
- Kouango

== Ouham Prefecture ==
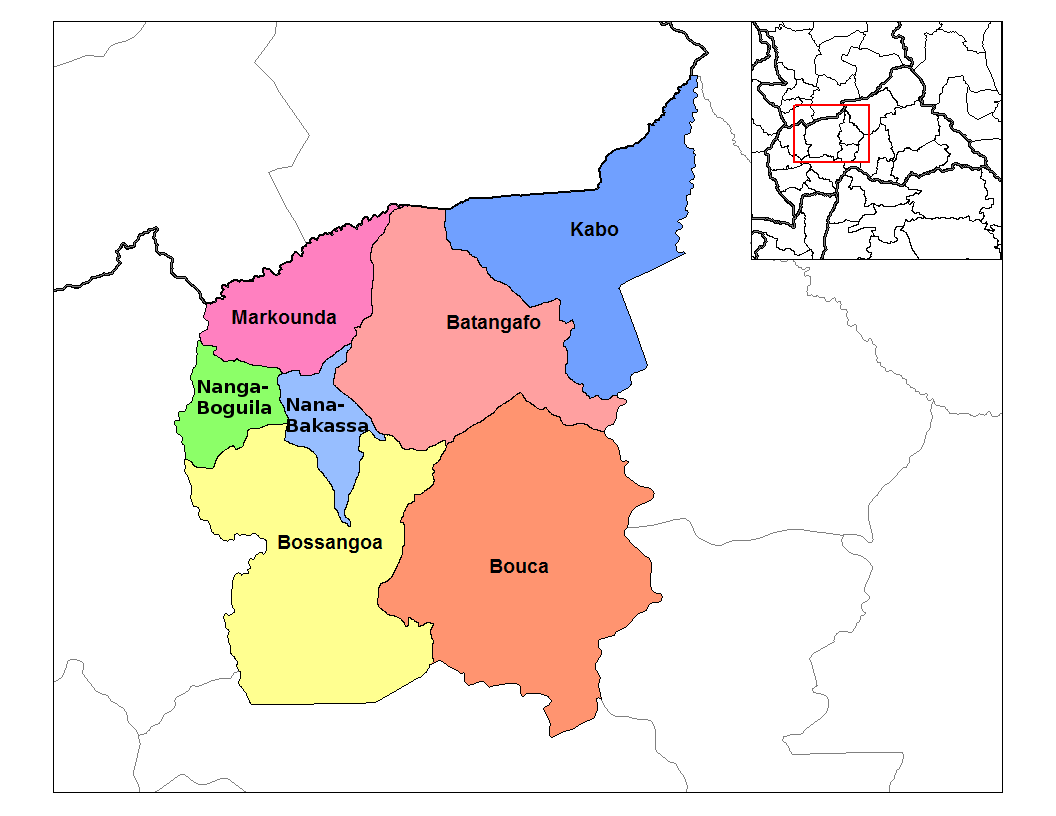
Sub-prefectures of Ouham

- Batangafo
- Bossangoa
- Markounda
- Nana-Bakassa
- Nanga-Boguila

== Ouham-Fafa Prefecture ==
- Batangafo
- Bouca
- Kabo
- Sido

== Ouham-Pendé Prefecture ==
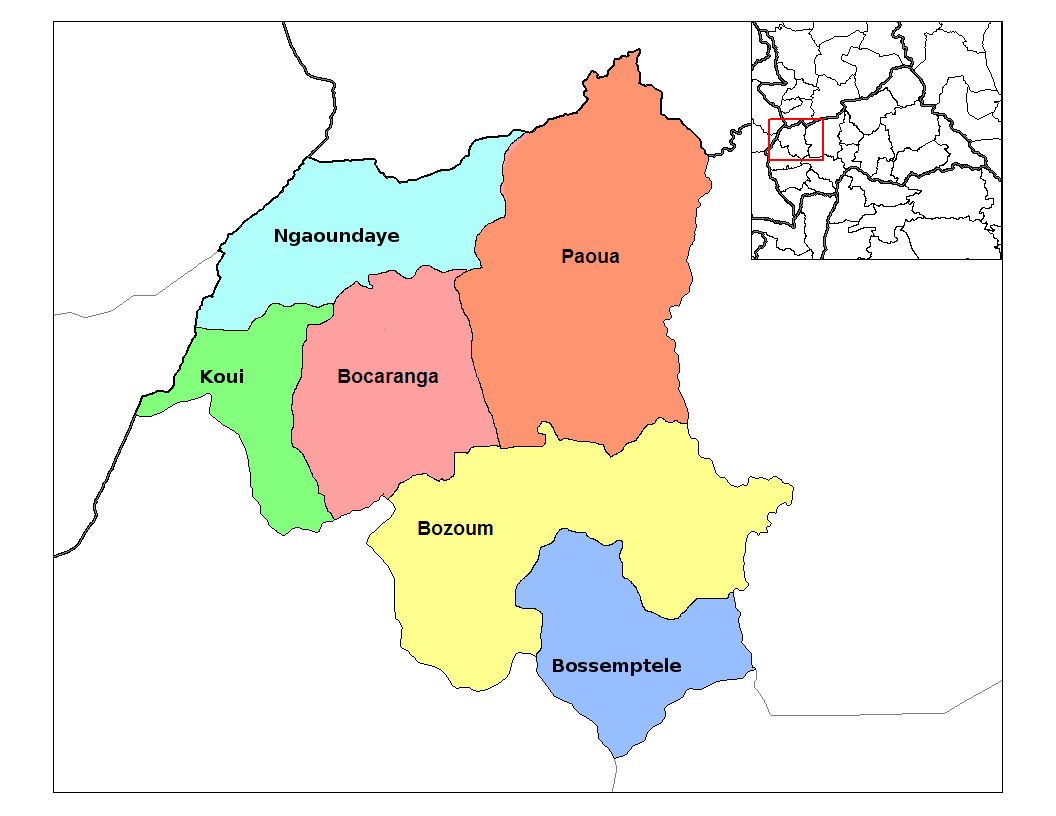
Sub-prefectures of Ouham-Pende

- Bocaranga
- Bozoum
- Bossemptele
- Koui
- Ngaoundaye
- Paoua

== Sangha-Mbaéré Economic Prefecture ==
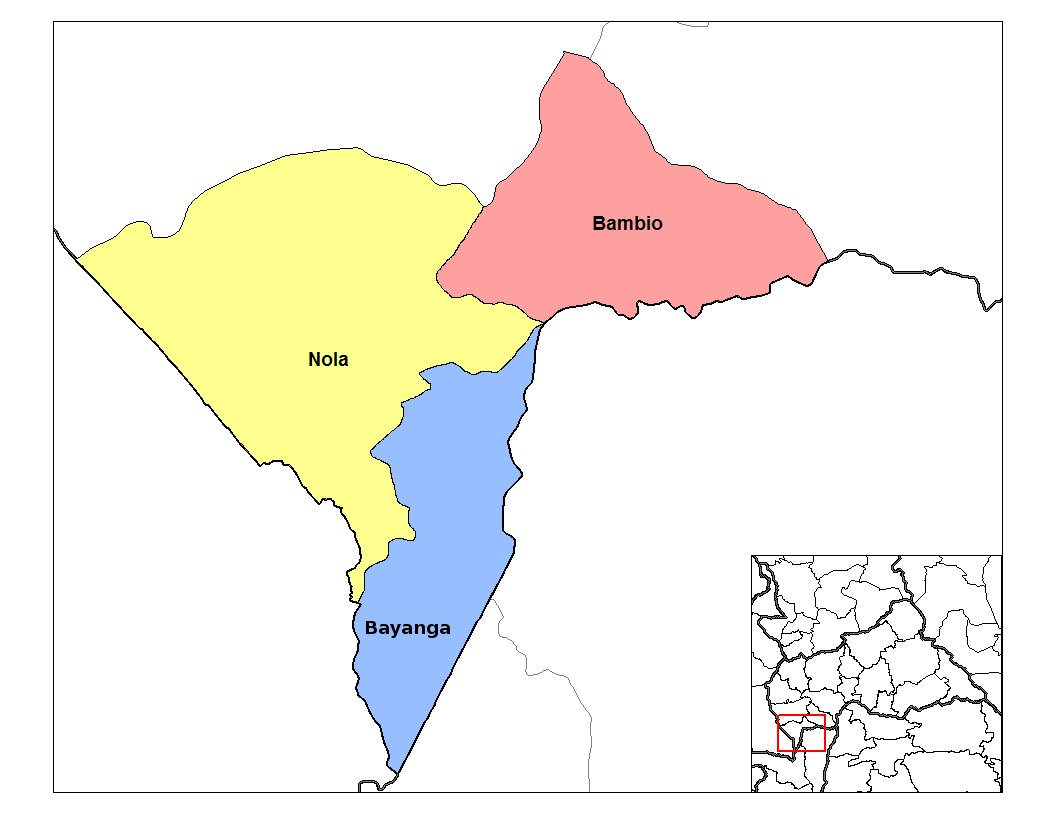
Sub-prefectures of Sangha-Mbaere

- Bambio
- Bayanga
- Nola

== Vakaga Prefecture ==
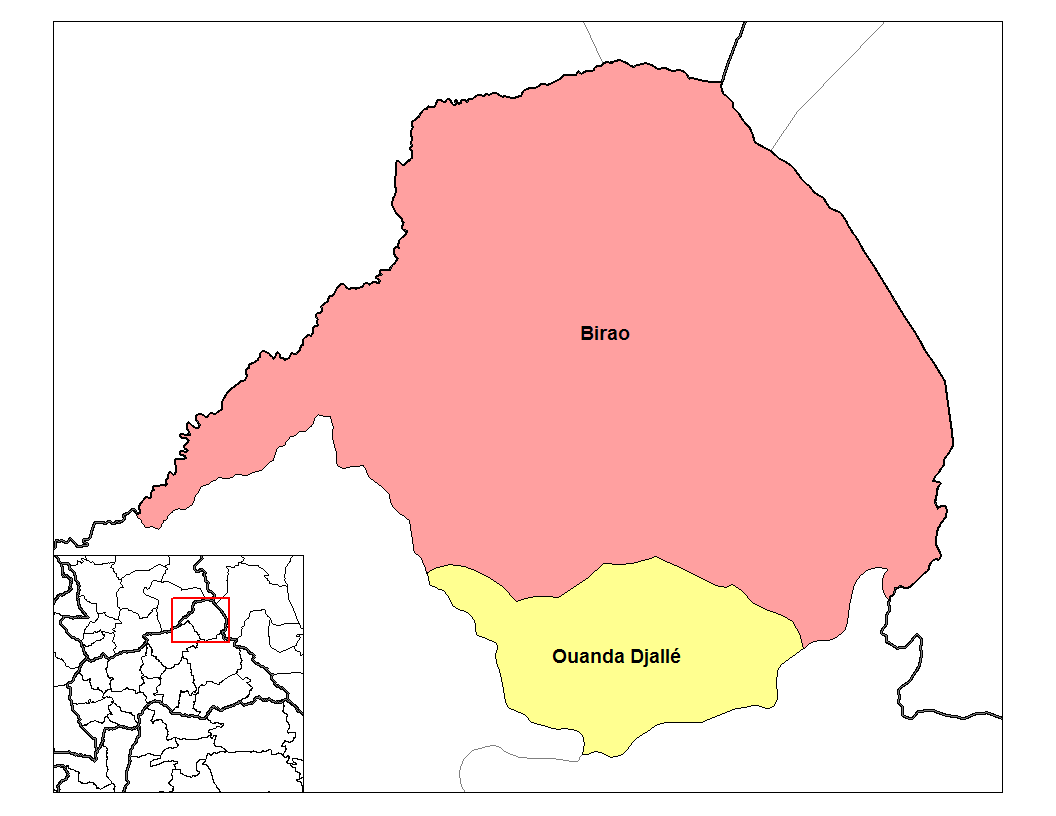
Sub-prefectures of Vakaga

- Birao
- Ouanda Djallé

== See also ==
- Prefectures of the Central African Republic
