= Prefectures of the Central African Republic =

Prefectures of the Central African Republic Préfectures de la République centrafricaine (French)
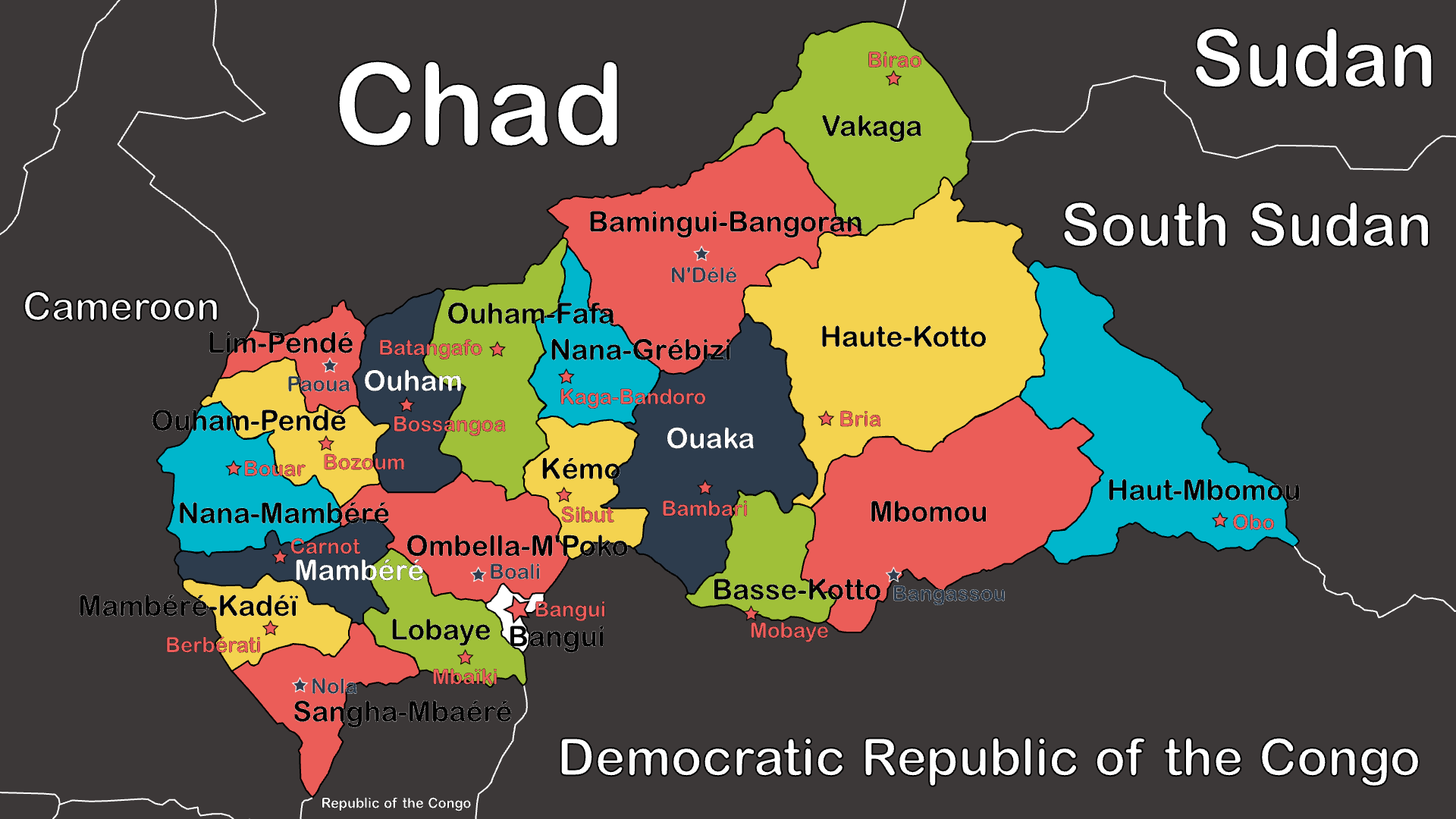
- Category: Unitary state
- Location: Central African Republic
- Number: 20 Prefectures
- Populations: 59,225 (Haut-Mbomou) – 1,464,921 (Bangui)
- Areas: 17,210 km^{2} (6,643 sq mi) (Kémo) – 86,700 km^{2} (33,460 sq mi) (Haute-Kotto)
- Government: Prefecture government, National government
- Subdivisions: Sub-Prefecture

Since 10 December 2020, the Central African Republic has been administratively divided into 20 prefectures (French: préfectures, Sango: kodoro kômanda-kôta), including the capital, Bangui.

Each prefecture is governed by a local assembly called General Council (Conseil Général), presided by a Prefect (Préfet). The prefectures are further subdivided into 84 sub-prefectures.

Prefectures are all named after major rivers passing through their areas:

- Ubangi, Nana, Mambéré, Kadeï, Lobaye, M'Poko, Ombella, Sangha, Kémo, Ouaka, Kotto, and Mbomou all flow into the Congo River.
- Pendé, Ouham, Gribingui, Bamingui, Bangoran, and Vakaga all flow into the Chari River, and then into Lake Chad.

(Basse ("Lower") means downstream, and Haut or Haute ("Upper") means upstream.)

== Table of Prefectures ==
No.	Prefecture	ISO code	Capital	Population (2024 estimate)	Area (km^{2})	Density (per km^{2} in 2024)	Zone/Region	Sub-prefectures	Communes
1.	Bangui	CF-BGF	Bangui	1,464,921	3,260	449.3	Bas-Oubangui (VII)	10	10
2.	Mbomou	CF-MB	Bangassou	267,647	61,150	4.3	Haut-Oubangui (VI)	5	10
3.	Basse-Kotto	CF-BK	Mobaye	393,276	17,604	22.3	Haut-Oubangui (VI)	6	15
4.	Kémo	CF-KG	Sibut	197,538	17,204	11.4	Kagas (IV)	4	8
5.	Nana-Mambéré	CF-NM	Bouar	371,863	26,600	13.9	Equateur (II)	4	16
6.	Ouham	CF-AC	Bossangoa	329,645	50,250	6.6	Yade (III)	7	20
7.	Sangha-Mbaéré	CF-SE	Nola	152,675	19,412	7.8	Equateur (II)	3	5
8.	Lobaye	CF-LB	Mbaïki	361,289	19,235	18.7	Plateaux (I)	5	12
9.	Ombella-M'Poko	CF-MP	Boali	292,618	31,835	9.1	Plateaux (I)	6	8
10.	Ouham-Pendé	CF-OP	Bozoum	254,649	32,100	7.9	Yade (III)	6	23
11.	Haut-Mbomou	CF-HM	Obo	59,225	55,530	1.0	Haut-Oubangui (VI)	4	5
12.	Ouaka	CF-UK	Bambari	459,412	49,900	9.2	Kagas (IV)	5	16
13.	Haute-Kotto	CF-HK	Bria	144,289	86,650	1.6	Fertit (V)	3	6
14.	Bamingui-Bangoran	CF-BB	Ndélé	85,472	58,200	1.4	Fertit (V)	2	3
15.	Vakaga	CF-VK	Birao	89,189	46,500	1.9	Fertit (V)	2	3
16.	Nana-Grébizi	CF-KB	Kaga-Bandoro	232,205	19,996	11.6	Kagas (IV)	2	6
17.	Mambéré-Kadéï	CF-HS	Berbérati	281,286	30,203	9.3	Equateur (II)	7	12
18.	Mambéré	n/a	Carnot	324,406	15,740	20.6	Equateur (II)	4	5
19.	Lim-Pendé	n/a	Paoua	469,545	13,210	35.5	Yade (III)	5	14
20.	Ouham-Fafa	n/a	Batangafo	239,157	32,530	7.3	Yade (III)	4	11

== See also ==
- ISO 3166-2:CF

== Sources ==
- Central African Republic
