= Air Centrafrique =

- Founded: 1966
- Commenced operations: 1967
- Ceased operations: 1979
- Headquarters: Bangui, Central African Republic

Air Centrafrique was the flag carrier of the Central African Republic from 1966 to the late 1970s. The company operated domestic services. It had its headquarters in Bangui.

== History ==
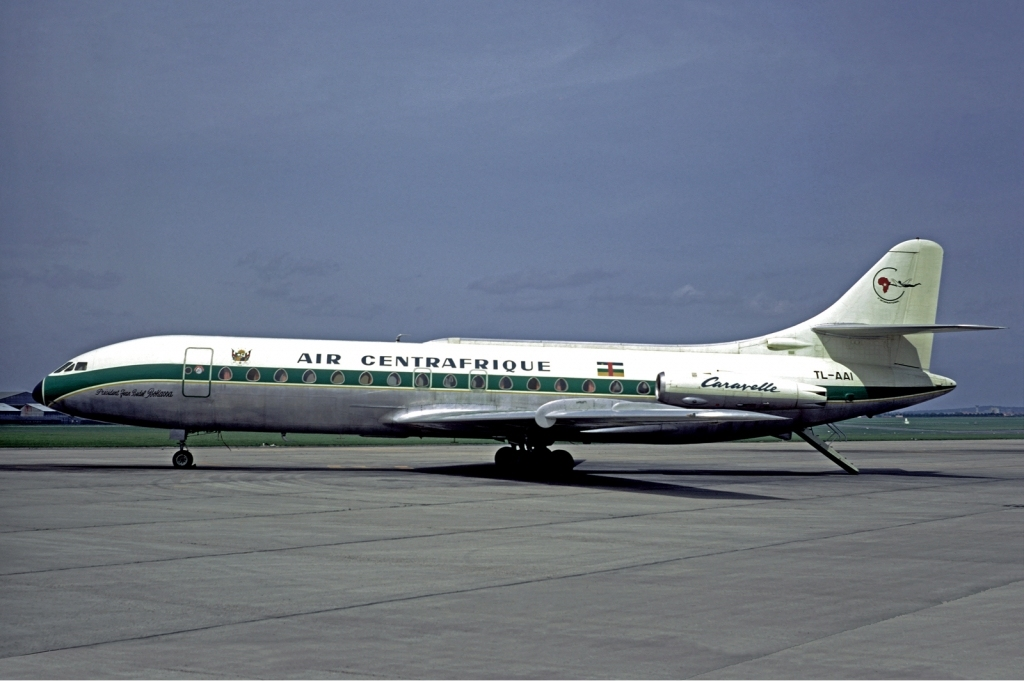
An Air Centrafrique Sud Aviation Caravelle at Le Bourget Airport in 1972.

The carrier was formed as Compagnie Centre Africaine Air Bangui in 1966 in association with Air Afrique and Union de Transports Aériens (UTA), with the latter providing management and technical assistance. It was conceived to provide feeder services to Air Afrique. Operations started in early 1967, linking Bangui with Berberati (Note: It was also informed that the first services flown by the company linked Bangui with Birao.) using Douglas DC-3 aircraft. In July 1967, a Beech 95 Baron was acquired for flying new routes to Bakouma and Bangassou.

One DC-3 and one Beech Baron made up the airline's aircraft lineup at March 1970. Gaining flag carrier status, the company was renamed Air Centrafrique in mid-1971 following reorganisation after the government attempted to withdraw from the Air Afrique consortium earlier that year.

The launching of Air Centrafrique as an independent airline was one of the moves of the proclaimed Emperor Bokassa I that indebted the country, to the point that banks began to refuse loans to the state in the same year. Following the rupture with Air Afrique, agreements were signed with Zaire, Congo and Chad for Air Centrafrique to fly to those destinations. On 13 February 1973, Bokassa issued a decree suspending operations of Air Centrafrique, due to a conflict with French navigation staff.

By March 1975, passenger scheduled services to Bangui, Bambari, Bangassou, Birao, Bouar, Bria, Carnot, M'Boki, Ouadda and Zemio were operated; seasonal flights were also undertaken during the safari hunting period. A Caravelle 3 entered the fleet in the late 1970s. (Note: An aircraft of the type was included in the airline's fleet in 1972.)

The airline ceased operations between 1978 and 1979. (Note: Air Centrafrique appeared in the World airline directory compilation published by Flight International in April 1978, but the entry was removed from that directory in April 1979. It is assumed that the carrier ceased operations at some time within that period.) The collapse of Air Centrafrique, along with other debacles of the Bokassa legacy, contributed to undermining the prestige of the Central African Republic internationally.

== Destinations ==
Following is a list of destinations served by Air Centrafrique all through its history:

Country	City	Airport	Notes	Refs
Central African Republic	Bakouma	Bakouma Airport	—	
Central African Republic	Bambari	Bambari Airport	—	
Central African Republic	Bangassou	Bangassou Airport	—	
Central African Republic	Bangui	Bangui M'Poko International Airport	Hub	
Central African Republic	Batangafo	Batangafo Airport	—	
Central African Republic	Birao	Birao Airport	—	
Central African Republic	Bossembele	Bossembélé Airport	—	
Central African Republic	Bouar	Bouar Airport	—	
Central African Republic	Bouca	Bouca Airport	—	
Central African Republic	Bria	Bria Airport	—	
Central African Republic	Carnot	Carnot Airport	—	
Central African Republic	Koumbala	Koumala Airport	—	
Central African Republic	Ndele	N'Délé Airport	—	
Central African Republic	Obo	M'Boki Airport	—	
Central African Republic	Ouadda	Ouadda Airport	—	
Central African Republic	Rafai	Rafaï Airport	—	
Central African Republic	Zemio	Zemio Airport	—	

== Fleet ==
Air Centrafrique operated the following aircraft throughout its history:

- Beech Baron
- Douglas DC-3
- Douglas DC-4
- DC-8-55
- Sud Aviation Caravelle III

== See also ==
- List of defunct airlines of the Central African Republic
- Transport in the Central African Republic

== Bibliography ==
- Guttery, Ben R. (1998). Encyclopedia of African Airlines. Jefferson, North Carolina: Mc Farland & Company, Inc. ISBN 0-7864-0495-7.
