= List of airports in the Central African Republic =

This is a list of airports in the Central African Republic, sorted by location.

== Airports ==
Airport names shown in bold indicate the airport has scheduled commercial airline service.

City served	ICAO	IATA	Airport name	Coordinates
Alindao	FEFA		Alindao Airport	05°1′20.1″N 021°11′54.1″E
Bakouma	FEGM	BMF	Bakouma Airport	05°41′38.3″N 022°48′1.0″E
Bambari	FEFM	BBY	Bambari Airport	05°50′49.6″N 020°38′58.4″E
Bangassou	FEFG	BGU	Bangassou Airport	04°47′8.5″N 022°46′57.5″E
Bangui	FEFF	BGF	**Bangui M'Poko International Airport**	04°23′57.9″N 018°31′9.6″E
Batangafo	FEGF	BTG	Batangafo Airport	07°18′51.7″N 018°18′32.3″E
Berbérati	FEFT	BBT	Berbérati Airport	04°13′10″N 015°47′12″E
Birao	FEFI	IRO	Birao Airport	10°14′13.4″N 022°42′58.9″E
Bocaranga	FEGC		Bocaranga Airport	06°55′27.6″N 015°37′26.6″E
Bossangoa	FEFS	BSN	Bossangoa Airport	06°29′31.1″N 017°25′46.0″E
Bossembélé	FEFL	BEM	Bossembélé Airport (closed)	05°16′00.00″N 17°38′00.00″E
Bouar	FEFO	BOP	Bouar Airport	05°57′32.0″N 015°38′15.9″E
Bouca	FEGU	BCF	Bouca Airport	06°31′1.4″N 018°16′21.2″E
Bozoum	FEGZ	BOZ	Bozoum Airport	06°20′39.0″N 016°19′19.4″E
Bria	FEFR	BIV	Bria Airport	06°31′43.5″N 021°59′19.3″E
Carnot	FEFC	CRF	Carnot Airport	04°56′17.0″N 015°53′37.7″E
Gamboula	FEGG		Gamboula Airport	04°8′17.2″N 015°9′14.8″E
Gordil	FEGL	GDI	Gordil Airport	09°34′55.5″N 021°43′35.0″E
Gounda		GDA	Gounda Airport (closed)	09°16′15″N 021°11′45″E
Kaga Bandoro	FEFQ		Kaga Bandoro Airport	06°59′16.4″N 019°10′38.4″E
Kembé	FEFK		Kembé Airport	04°36′50.2″N 021°51′44.4″E
Koumala		KOL	Koumala Airport (closed)	8°29′50″N 21°15′25″E
Mobaye	FEFE		Mobaye Mbanga Airport	04°22′30″N 021°8′0″E
N'Délé	FEFN	NDL	N'Délé Airport	08°25′36.8″N 020°38′6.8″E
Obo	FEGE	MKI	M'Boki Airport	05°19′58.7″N 025°55′53.8″E
Obo	FEFB		Poste Airport	05°24′15.2″N 026°29′14.3″E
Ouadda	FEFW	ODA	Ouadda Airport	08°0′38.7″N 022°23′52.6″E
Ouanda Djallé	FEGO	ODJ	Ouanda Djallé Airport	08°54′24.9″N 022°47′51.6″E
Paoua	FEFP		Paoua Airport	07°15′6.3″N 016°26′26.6″E
Rafaï	FEGR	RFA	Rafaï Airport	04°59′19.1″N 023°55′41.1″E
Sibut	FEFU		Sibut Airport	05°43′28.0″N 019°6′22.8″E
Yalinga	FEFY	AIG	Yalinga Airport	06°31′15.2″N 023°15′34.4″E
Zémio	FEFZ	IMO	Zémio Airport	05°0′7.7″N 025°6′8.1″E

== See also ==
- Central African Republic Air Force
- Transport in the Central African Republic
- List of airports by ICAO code: F#FE – Central African Republic
- Wikipedia: WikiProject Aviation/Airline destination lists: Africa#Central African Republic
