= List of defunct airlines of the Central African Republic =

This is a list of defunct airlines of Central African Republic .

Airline	Image	IATA	ICAO	Callsign	Commenced operations	Ceased operations	Notes
Africa Airlines					2012	2012	Renamed to Karinou Airlines. Operated Boeing 737-200
Africa Lines					2003	2005	
African Airlines		FD			2004	2004	Operated Antonov An-12
Air Bangui					1966	1971	
Air Centrafrique		QR			1969	1972	
Air Oubangui					2007	2007	
Bako Air			OGJ		2007	2009	Operated Boeing 737-200
Centrafrican Airlines		GC	CET	CENTRAFRICAN	1998	2001	Operated An-8, An-12, An-32, An-72, IL-62M, IL-76, Tu-154, Yak-40
Centrafrique Air Express		6C	CAE	EXPRESS CENTRAF	2006	2009	Operated Boeing 727, Boeing 737, Boeing 747,
Centravia					1989	1996	
Compagnie Centre Africaine Air Bangui					1967	1971	Renamed to Air Centrafrique. Operated Beech Baron, Douglas DC-3
Inter RCA			CAR	QUEBEC ROMEO	1990s	1990s	
Lobaye Airways		LB	LBA		2007	2007	
Minair			OMR	ORMINE	2004	2006	
Okapi Airways					1990s	1990s	
Societé Centrafricain de Transports Aeriens			SNS		1987	1991	
Societé des Transports Aériens Centrafricain					1978	1979	Operated Canadair CL-44, Douglas DC-8-20
Transafrican		?	?	?	????	????	

== See also ==
- List of airlines of the Central African Republic
- List of airports in the Central African Republic
