= Kongo-Wara rebellion =

1928–31 rebellion in French Equatorial Africa and Cameroon

Date	1928–1931
Location	French Equatorial Africa, French Cameroon
Result	Rebellion defeated

Belligerents
Gbaya people and clans Co-belligerents: Mbum people Mbai people Pana people Yangere people Mbimou people Goundi people	France: (France) French Equatorial Africa; (France) French Cameroon; Fula people Co-belligerents: Gbaya chiefdoms

Commanders and leaders
Karnou †; Bissi; Yandjere	Governor Auguste Lamblin; Paul Germain; Gaëtan Germain; Pierre Crubillé; Lt. Émile Boutin

Strength
290,000 villagers 60,000 warriors	Unknown

Casualties and losses
10,000+	Unknown

The Kongo-Wara rebellion, also known as the War of the Hoe Handle and the Baya War, was a rural, anticolonial rebellion in the former colonies of French Equatorial Africa and French Cameroon which began as a result of recruitment of the native population in railway construction and rubber tapping. It was a large colonial uprising but also among the least well-known uprisings during the interwar period. Much of the conflict took place in what is now part of the Central African Republic.

== Background ==
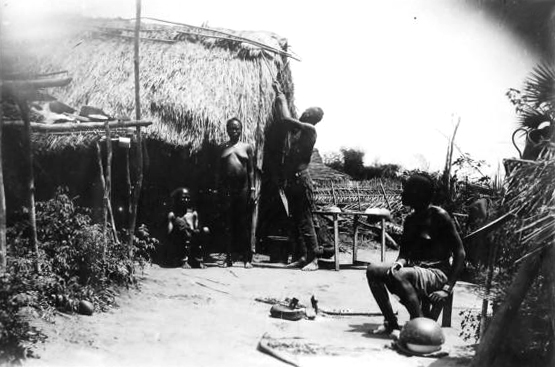
Forced labour family camp during construction of the Congo-Ocean Railway 1930.

Barka Ngainoumbey, known as Karnou (meaning "he who can change the world"), was a Gbaya religious prophet and healer from the Sangha River basin region. In 1924 he began preaching non-violent resistance against the French colonisers in response to the recruitment of natives in the construction of the Congo-Ocean Railway and rubber tapping, and mistreatment by European concessionary companies. Karnou also preached against Europeans and the Fula, who administered sections of Gbaya territory in French Cameroon on France's behalf. The nonviolent overthrow of the French and Fulani was to be achieved through the use of traditional medicine, symbolised by a small hooked stick that resembled a miniature hoe handle (koŋgo wara) that was distributed by Karnou to his followers. A movement emerged around Karnou, which grew to include a boycott of European merchandise and black solidarity. This movement went unnoticed by the French administration, which had only a limited presence in the region, until 1927, when many of the movement's followers began to take up arms. By this time there were over 350,000 adherents to the movement, including around 60,000 warriors. Such unity was unprecedented in a region known for its political fragmentation and historical lack of centralised authority.

== Fighting ==
Armed conflict broke out in mid 1928 in a clash between Karnou's followers and a group of Fula pastoralists between the towns of Baboua and Bouar, followed by similar attacks on a caravan of Hausa merchants near Gankombon and a French agricultural agent accompanied by police escort at Nahing. Karnou's message spread rapidly on the back of these engagements and many distant Gbaya groups sent emissaries to Karnou in order to adopt his methods. Violence quickly spread towards French traders, French government posts and local chiefs and soldiers who worked for the French. Bouar was then occupied and burned down by Karnou's followers. Insurgency by Karnou's followers continued in the following months despite being ill-equipped. As a whole, the conflict took place away from urban centers.

A French counterattack with reinforced troops was launched in late 1928 and on December 11, Karnou was killed by a French military patrol. The rebellion, however, continued to spread unevenly from the Sangha basin to include the neighbouring groups from Cameroon and the lower Ubangi region, namely in the Mbéré and Vina valleys of French Cameroons, around the towns of Baïbokoum and Moïssala in southern Chad, around the towns of Yaloke, Bambio, Ndele and Boda in the Mambéré-Kadéï and Lobaye regions of Ubangi-Shari, and around the town of Berandjoko in the French Congo.

To further quell "dissent", French troops were dispatched to imprison followers of the movement and also sent into areas of forest unaffected by the rebellion to relocate natives. French authorities also attempted to forcibly recruit swathes of natives in the fight against the rebels, however this was avoided by many groups including the Ngando people, many of whom abandoned their villages and relocated to camps deep in the forest for the duration of the conflict, as had occurred during periods of forced labour. The final stage of the conflict, known as the "war of the caves", took place in 1931.

Kongo-Wara followers fought under the premise of invulnerability from European soldiers from a sacred hoe handle. This mysticism, perpetuated by Karnou, encouraged unmilitarized villagers to fight bravely yet recklessly. One recorded example of this behaviour was an account of a man dancing before a French commander and threatening him with a spear while chanting: "fire, big gorilla; your gun will only shoot water".

=== Allegiances ===
Though initially a response to the atrocities committed by concession companies, the rebellion spread quickly to eastern Cameroon and southern Chad, both of which had never been controlled by such companies. Among Gbaya clans themselves, those in eastern Cameroon and western Ubangi-Shari which had cultivated links with their Fulani neighbours and French and/or former German colonisers chose to side instead with the French administration in opposing the rebellion. This was because their diplomatic ties had allowed their leaders to become officially recognised chiefs. Examples include the Gbaya chiefs in the villages of Alim and Gbangen, in the Mbéré and Pangara valleys, respectively, the Gbaya chief in the village of Lokoti and the Mbum chief in the village of Mboula, both in the Meiganga sub-prefecture, all in Cameroon. The Gbaya chiefs in the villages of Abba and Gaza in Ubangi-Shari too supported the French administration.

Much of this spread in activity against France, meanwhile, was a series of parochial reactions to the indiscriminate French suppression, with far-reaching associations with Karnou's movement being nominal at best and existing only out of convenience. This is also the case for the support by groups other than the Gbaya, as although Karnou's preachings revolved around universal Gbaya traditions and spirituality, it was not pan-ethnic in its appeal.

== Aftermath ==
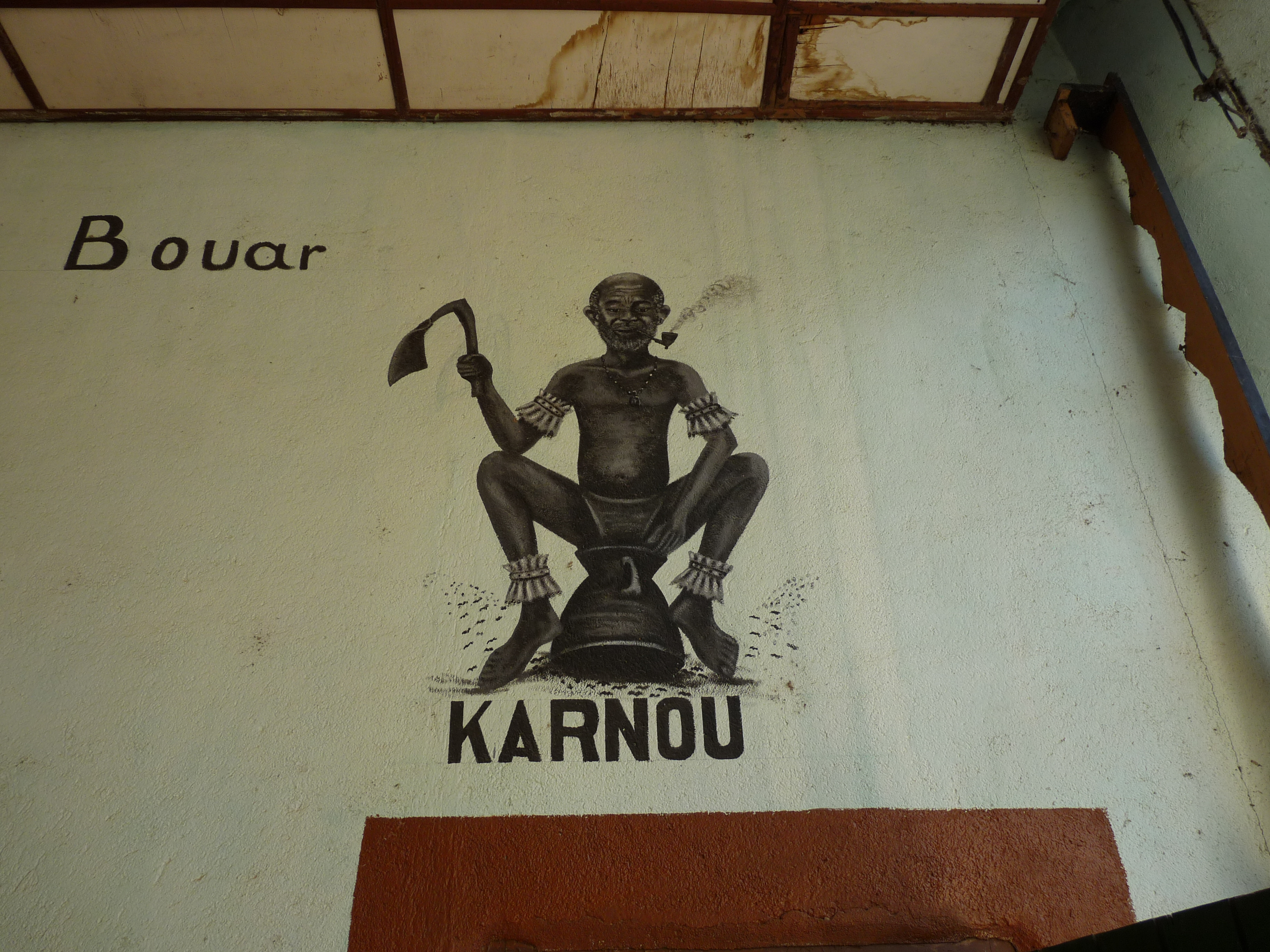
Depiction of Karnou in 2016 as a "Hero of Bouar".

The Kongo rebellion was suppressed in 1931 but had become the largest interwar insurrection of either French Cameroon or French Equatorial Africa. In the wake of the rebellion the movement's leaders were imprisoned and executed, although two of Karnou's lieutenants, Bissi and Yandjere, were not captured until 1935. Populations of natives were also forcibly relocated to designated villages where they could be supervised. Two of these villages are Ngoundi and Ndele of the Sangha-Mbaéré prefecture.

In order to assert control over the region the French administration divided the Kadei-Sangha Department, where the rebellion had originated, into the Haute-Sangha and N'Goko-Sangha department in 1933. In the following year, however, the two departments were merged. In response to the rebellion French authorities agreed not to renew the leases of concessionary companies, however European business interests, including plantations, continued to be promoted in the region.

Unlike other conflicts to have occurred in French colonies, the Kongo-Wara rebellion was relegated to relative obscurity amongst the public in France and few politicians and commentators remarked of it. What little news of the rebellion that was made known in Europe helped bring attention to the conditions faced by Central African workers. This led to criticism of French rule in Africa from communists and other groups, leading to French suspicions of the rebellion itself being instigated by communists. Though not achieving independence from the French colonial administration, the Kongo-Wara rebellion achieved an improvement in the conditions which initially sparked resistance, as the administration reduced the worse forms of oppression in a self-interested reaction to negative press the rebellion had caused. The rebellion also exposed several larger issues endemic to the French colonial system; the effect of unchecked, unrestricted capitalism upon native populations, and the fact that stability was dependent on a fragile, rural elite. Calls for fundamental reform in the wake of these revelations were silenced once order had been restored.

During the 1940s and 50s, vanguard Central African nationalist and first Prime Minister of the autonomous territory, Barthélemy Boganda, explicitly equated himself to Karnou and utilised the mass appeal of the rebellion to successfully mobilise nationalistic sentiments among Central Africans for political purposes. Boganda incidentally died in a plane crash in Lobaye, near where one version of the story tells of Karnou having seen a sign from God in the form of a shooting star. Boganda's former lieutenant, Abel Goumba, also overtly identified with the story in his nationalist movement against the alleged French puppet, President David Dacko.

The story of the rebellion continues to be passed on by Gbaya people in the form of traditional Gbaya folktales, sometimes including songs. It continues to have relevance, with Karnou's prophecies explaining the radical change in the experience of Africans under colonialism, namely regarding the new, politico-economic and Christian religious orders. It is also claimed that Boganda was the reincarnation of Karnou, having visited the epicentre of the rebellion that was Karnou's former residence in the early 1950s. In this way, the story of Karnou serves to reconcile Gbaya myth and tradition with the tumultuous history of Central Africa.

In the town of Meiganga, Cameroon, there is a cinema named after Karnou. More recently, a Central African airline has been named Karinou Airlines, using an outdated spelling of Karnou.
