= Bozoum Airport =

- IATA: BOZ; ICAO: FEGZ

Summary
- Airport type: Public
- Serves: Bozoum, Central African Republic
- Elevation AMSL: 2,188 ft / 667 m
- Coordinates: 6°20′35″N 16°19′20″E

Map
- Location of Bozoum Airport in the Central African Republic

Runways
Direction	Length		Surface
Direction	m	ft	Surface
18/36	995	3,264	Dirt
- Source: Landings.com Google Maps GCM

Bozoum Airport (IATA: BOZ, ICAO: FEGZ) is an airstrip serving Bozoum, a town in the Ouham-Pendé prefecture of the Central African Republic. The runway is 6 kilometres (4 mi) west-northwest of the town, on the opposite side of the Ouham River.

== See also ==
- Transport in the Central African Republic
- List of airports in the Central African Republic
