= Nguénguéli =

Village in Sangha-Mbaéré, Central African Republic

- Location in Central African Republic
- Coordinates: 3°14′11″N 16°15′18″E
- Country: Central African Republic
- Prefecture: Sangha-Mbaéré
- Sub-prefecture: Bayanga
- Commune: Yobé-Sangha

Population (2021)
  - Total: 1,234

Nguénguéli, also known as Ngengeli, is a village situated in Sangha-Mbaéré Prefecture, Central African Republic and on the crossroad toward SINFOCAM site.

== History ==
There are two versions of the village founding. According to Noss, responding to the Monasao's population increase, some of its residents moved and established a settlement south of their former village, Nguénguéli. Meanwhile, Tieguhong and Ndoye stipulated that Baaka from Salo-Beya axis founded Nguénguéli before the existence of Monasao. In 1994, Nguénguéli had a population of 600 inhabitants whose residents were Baaka. The village's total populations was 700 in 2016.

== Demography ==
Nguénguéli is inhabited by Baaka and Bilo.

== Economy ==
Hunting, gathering, farming, and livestock rearing are the villagers' main economy activities. In 2004, a timber company named Bayanga Wood Company operated in Nguénguéli for six months.

== Education ==
There is a school in the village.

== Bibliography ==
- Noss, Andrew J. (1995). Duikers, Cables, And Nets : A Cultural Ecology Of Hunting In A Central African Forest (Thesis). University of Florida.
- Tieguhong, Julius Chupezi; Ndoye, Ousseynou (2007). The impact of timber harvesting on the availability of non-wood forest products in the Congo Basin (PDF) (Report).
