= Ouanda =

Ouanda may refer to:

- Ouanda Djallé, town in Vakaga, Central African Republic
- Ouanda Djallé Airport, airport in Ouanda Djallé, Central African Republic
- Adonija Ouanda (born 2005), Ivorian footballer
