= N10 road (Central African Republic) =

Road in Central African Republic

N10 Road

Route information
- Maintained by Central African Republic National Highways Authority

Major junctions
- North end: Berbérati
- South end: Nola

Location
- Country: Central African Republic

Highway system
- Transport in the Central African Republic

The N10 road also designated as RN10, is a national route in Central African Republic with a total distance of 134 kilometers. The road provides connection between the towns of Berbérati and Nola, located in the southwestern region of the country. As a key transportation route, the N10 facilitates travel and commerce between these two towns, contributing to the regional economy and social development.

== Route ==
The N10 route originates in Berbérati, a small town where it intersects with the N6. Initially, the road extends approximately 80 kilometers southeast, venturing into the dense tropical rainforest. As an unpaved road, the N10 traverses flat and sparsely populated areas, characteristic of the region. From Katakpo, the road continues southwest for an additional 50 kilometers, ultimately terminating in the town of Nola, situated on the banks of the Sangha River. Notably, some maps indicate that the N10 may extend further west from Nola, spanning an additional 80 kilometers to the border with Cameroon, although this segment is not universally recognized.

== History ==
The N10 serves as a link between the town of Nola, which has a population of approximately 29,000 inhabitants, and the rest of the Central African Republic. However, it is not a through connection, but rather a critical access route for the local community. The entirety of the N10 is a dirt road, making it challenging to navigate during and after rainfall, which can impact its passability and the movement of people and goods.
