= Senkpa-Mbaéré =

- sub-prefectures
- Location in Central African Republic
- Coordinates: 4°30′10″N 16°29′40″E
- Country: Central African Republic
- Prefecture: Mambéré

Government
  - Sub-Prefect: Pierre Dotoua

Area
- 966.82 sq mi (2,504.04 km^{2})

Population (2021)
  - Total: 18,270

Senkpa-Mbaéré is a sub-prefecture in the Central African Republic. It extends south of the town of Carnot, and takes its name from the Mbaéré river, a tributary of the Lobaye.

== Geography ==
The commune of Senkpa-Mbaéré is located in the east of the prefecture of Mambéré.

== History ==
Before 2020, the commune was in the prefecture of Mambéré-Kadéï. Senkpa-Mbaéré became a sub-prefecture following the administrative reform at the end of 2020.

== Villages ==
The main villages of the commune are: Koumbé, Kamba, Boudoua, Kanga-Barc, Mboula, Kamanga, Malbeve, and Mbatamalé. In the countryside, the commune has 35 villages recorded in 2003: Barka-Bac, Boudoua, Bourdil, Dengbe, Djingando, Dondi-Nord, Gbago, Gboyo-Beya, Guembe, Kamanga, Kamba, Kanga-Bac, Kankele 1, Kankele 2, Kolou, Koumbe, Kpama, Mambeve, Mbaere, Mbatamale, Mboula Centre, Mekongo, Ndourou, Ngoungou, Pakanza, Panga 1, Panga 2, Panga 3, Ribozo, Songuene, Tengue, Votovo, Wamini, Wanyale, Zaoro-Dana.

== Education ==
The commune has 4 public schools in Kamba, Dengbe, Mboula, and Panga, as well as one private school: Sainte Famille associated Catholic school in Mboula.
