= Zabé =

- Location in Central African Republic
- Coordinates: 5°51′54″N 22°13′19″E
- Country: Central African Republic
- Prefecture: Mbomou
- Sub-prefecture: Bakouma
- Commune: Bakouma

Population (2016)
  - Total: 517

Zabé is a village situated in Mbomou Prefecture, Central African Republic.

== History ==
LRA attacked Zabé on 18 January 2016. They burned 48 homes, abducted eight people, and looted food and community radio. Due to the LRA's incursion, the residents of Zabé and its surroundings fled to the bush. They only returned to their respective village in March and April 2016.

Due to the UPC's attack in Kologbota on 14 April 2024, many of the villagers sought refuge in Bakouma.

== Economy ==
Agriculture is the main economic income for the majority of residents.

== Education ==
Zabé has one school. However, the school was closed due to the LRA attack in January 2016.

== Healthcare ==
There is a health center in the village. In 2015, the health center stopped its operation due to the lack of medicine and equipment.

== Bibliography ==
- ACTED (May 2016). Evaluation multisectorielle RRM - rapport préliminaire : Villages de Ndambissoua, Ouago, et Zabé, commune de Bakouma, sous-préfecture de Bakouma, Préfecture du Mbomou, du 08 au 11 mai 2015 (PDF) (Report).
