= Sibut Airport =

- IATA: none; ICAO: FEFU

Summary
- Airport type: Public
- Owner: Government
- Serves: Sibut, Central African Republic
- Elevation AMSL: 1,460 ft (450 m)
- Coordinates: 5°42′40″N 19°04′15″E

Map
- Location of Sibut Airport in the Central African Republic

Runways
Direction	Length		Surface
Direction	m	ft	Surface
15/33	760	2,493	Grass
- Sources: Landings.com Google Maps GCM

Sibut Airport (ICAO: FEFU) is an airstrip serving Sibut, a city in the Kémo prefecture of the Central African Republic. The airstrip is 2 kilometres (1.2 mi) southwest of the town. It was built after January 2014 and replaces a long closed airport east of Sibut.

== See also ==
- Transport in the Central African Republic
- List of airports in the Central African Republic
