= N11 road (Central African Republic) =

Road in Central African Republic

N11 Road

Route information
- Maintained by Central African Republic National Highways Authority

Major junctions
- North end: Carnot
- South end: Baoro

Location
- Country: Central African Republic

Highway system
- Transport in the Central African Republic

The N11 road also designated as RN11, is a national route in Central African Republic with a total distance of 94 kilometers. The road connects the N6 near Carnot to the N3 in Baoro, forming a north–south axis in the western region of the country. As a dirt road, the N11 provides a link between these two routes, facilitating travel and commerce in the area. However, its unpaved surface poses challenges during adverse weather conditions.
