= Evangelical Baptist Church of the Central African Republic =

Baptist Christian denomination in the CAR

- Classification: Evangelicalism
- Theology: Baptist
- Associations: Baptist World Alliance
- Headquarters: Berbérati, Central African Republic
- Origin: 1962
- Congregations: 237
- Members: 68,397
- Official website: eeb-rca.com

The Evangelical Baptist Church of the Central African Republic (Église Évangélique Baptiste en République Centrafricaine) is a Baptist Christian denomination, affiliated with the Baptist World Alliance, in Central African Republic. The headquarters is in Berbérati.

== History ==
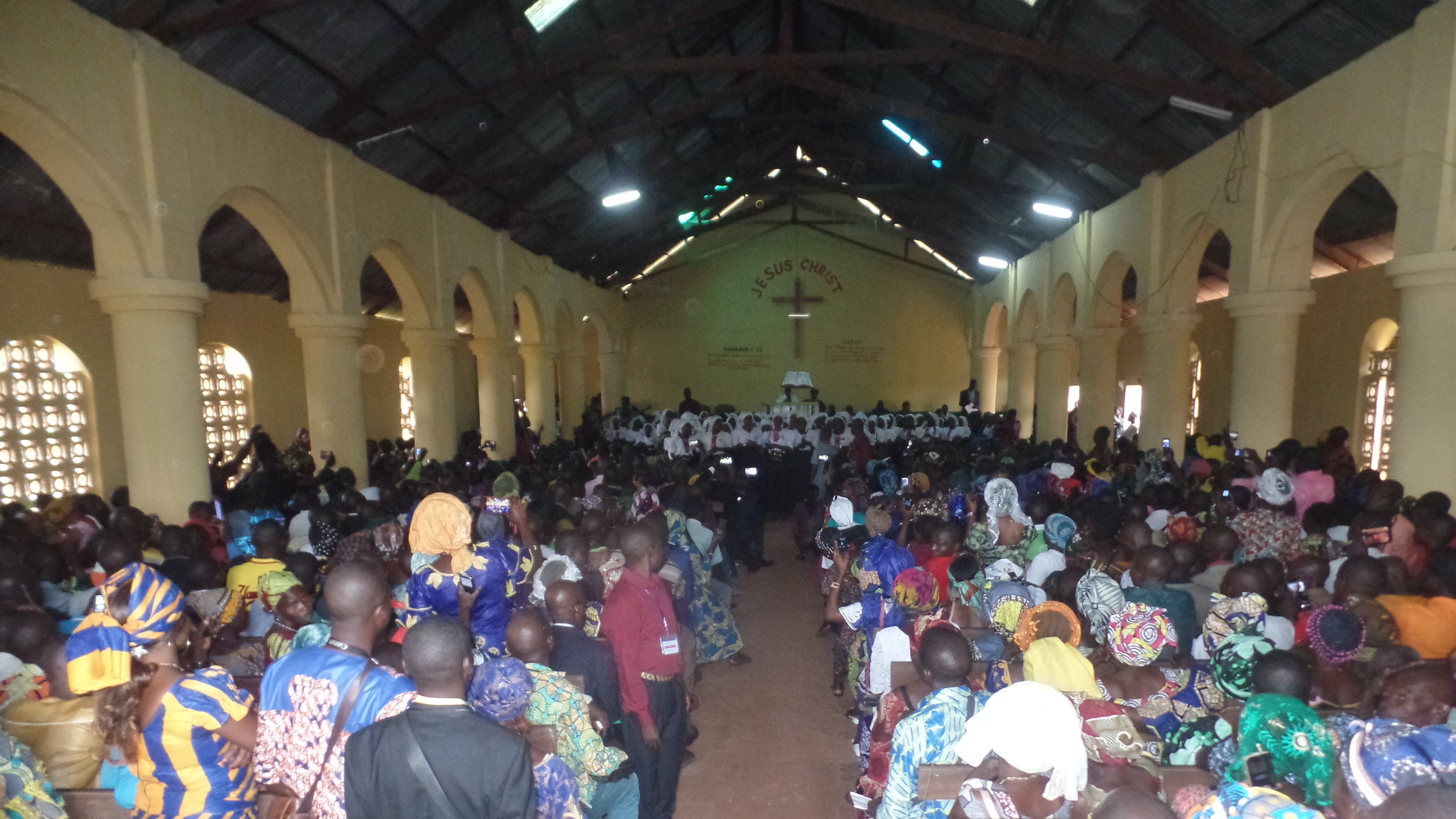
Worship service at the Evangelical Baptist Church of Berbérati-centre, affiliated to the Union.

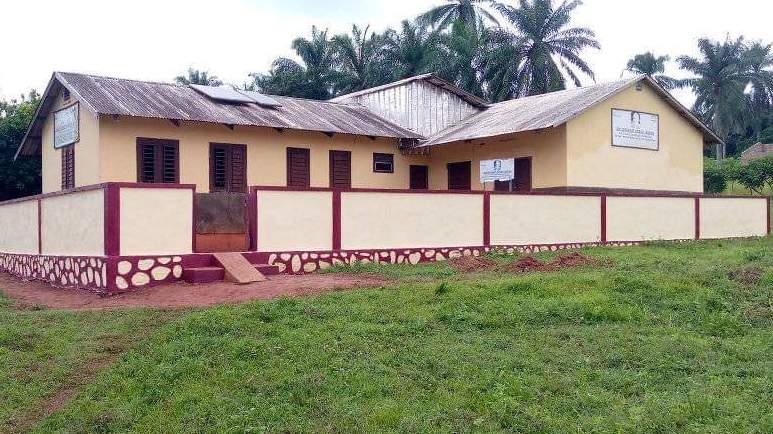
John Hilberth Institute of Theology in Carnot, Central African Republic.

The Evangelical Baptist Church of the Central African Republic has its origins in a Swedish mission of the Örebro Mission in 1923 in Bania, Mambéré-Kadéï. It was officially founded in 1962. According to a census published by the denomination in 2023, it claimed 237 churches and 68,397 members.

== See also ==
- Bible
- Born again
- Jesus Christ
- Believers' Church
