= Gounda Airport =

- IATA: GDA; ICAO: none

Summary
- Airport type: Closed
- Serves: Gounda, Central African Republic
- Coordinates: 9°16′15″N 21°11′45″E

Map
- Location of Gounda Airport in the Central African Republic

Runways
Direction	Length		Surface
Direction	ft	m	Surface
Closed
- Source: WAC Bing Maps

Gounda Airport (IATA: GDA) was a rural airstrip in the Bamingui-Bangoran prefecture of the Central African Republic.

== See also ==
- Transport in the Central African Republic
- List of airports in the Central African Republic
