= Paoua Airport =

- IATA: none; ICAO: FEFP

Summary
- Airport type: Public
- Owner: Government
- Serves: Paoua, Central African Republic
- Elevation AMSL: 2,037 ft / 621 m
- Coordinates: 7°15′00″N 16°26′27″E

Map
- Location of Paoua Airport in the Central African Republic

Runways
Direction	Length		Surface
Direction	m	ft	Surface
18/36	1,400	4,593	Grass
- Source: Landings.com Google Maps GCM

Paoua Airport (ICAO: FEFP) is an airport serving Paoua, a city in the Ouham-Pendé prefecture of the Central African Republic. The airport is on the northeast side of the city.

== See also ==
- Transport in the Central African Republic
- List of airports in the Central African Republic
