= Kembé Airport =

Airport in the Central African Republic

- IATA: none; ICAO: FEFK

Summary
- Airport type: Public
- Serves: Kembé, Central African Republic
- Elevation AMSL: 1,913 ft (583 m)
- Coordinates: 4°36′50″N 21°51′45″E

Map
- Location of Kembé Airport in the Central African Republic

Runways
Direction	Length		Surface
Direction	m	ft	Surface
09/27	1,780	5,840	Grass
- Source: Landings.com Google Maps GCM

Kembé Airport (ICAO: FEFK) is an airstrip serving Kembé, a village in the Basse-Kotto prefecture of the Central African Republic. The runway is just west of the village.

The Kembe non-directional beacon (Ident: KB) is located on the field.

== See also ==
- Transport in the Central African Republic
- List of airports in the Central African Republic
