= Gamboula Airport =

- IATA: none; ICAO: FEGG

Summary
- Airport type: Public
- Serves: Gamboula, Central African Republic
- Elevation AMSL: 2,001 ft / 610 m
- Coordinates: 4°8′17″N 15°9′15″E

Map
- Location of Gamboula Airport in the Central African Republic

Runways
Direction	Length		Surface
Direction	m	ft	Surface
06/24	1,085	3,560	Grass
- Source: Landings.com Google Maps GCM

Gamboula Airport (ICAO: FEGG) is an airstrip serving Gamboula, a town in the Mambéré-Kadéï prefecture of the Central African Republic. The airstrip is 3 kilometres (2 mi) northeast of the town, alongside the RN6 road.

The Berberati VOR (Ident: BT) is located 38.4 nautical miles (71.1 km) east of the airstrip.

== See also ==
- Transport in the Central African Republic
- List of airports in the Central African Republic
