= Bouar Airport =

- IATA: BOP; ICAO: FEFO

Summary
- Airport type: Public
- Serves: Bouar, Central African Republic
- Elevation AMSL: 3,374 ft / 1,028 m
- Coordinates: 5°57′35″N 15°38′15″E

Map
- Location of Bouar Airport in the Central African Republic

Runways
Direction	Length		Surface
Direction	m	ft	Surface
17/35	1,960	6,430	Asphalt, dirt
- Sources: GCM Google Maps SkyVector

Bouar Airport (IATA: BOP, ICAO: FEFO) is an airport serving Bouar, a city in the Nana-Mambere prefecture of the Central African Republic.

The airport is 5 kilometres (3.1 mi) east of the city. Most of the runway is dirt, with asphalt pavement on both ends.

The Bouar non-directional beacon (Ident: FBU) is located on the field.

== See also ==
- Transport in the Central African Republic
- List of airports in the Central African Republic
