= Belemboké =

- Location in Central African Republic
- Coordinates: 3°23′0″N 16°13′14″E
- Country: Central African Republic
- Prefecture: Sangha-Mbaéré
- Sub-prefecture: Nola
- Commune: Nola

Population (2021)
  - Total: 1,925

Belemboké is a village situated in Sangha-Mbaéré Prefecture, Central African Republic.

== History ==
A French Missionary named Father Lambert founded Belemboké in 1973 to create a settlement for Baka people. In 1985, around 2,000 Bakas inhabited the village.

== Demographics ==
Baka people make up the majority of the village population.

== Education ==
There is a school in the village that is provided by the catholic mission.

== Healthcare ==
Belemboké has one health center. In 2021, the health center had 24-hour electricity access after a solar panel was planted on the building's roof.
