= Kaga Bandoro Airport =

- IATA: none; ICAO: FEFQ

Summary
- Airport type: Public
- Serves: Kaga Bandoro, Central African Republic
- Elevation AMSL: 1,476 ft (450 m)
- Coordinates: 6°59′15″N 19°10′38″E

Map
- Location of Kaga Bandoro Airport in the Central African Republic

Runways
Direction	Length		Surface
Direction	m	ft	Surface
17/35	1,050	3,445	Grass
- Source: Landings.com Google Maps GCM

Kaga Bandoro Airport (ICAO: FEFQ) is an airstrip serving Kaga Bandoro, a town in the Nana-Grébizi prefecture of the Central African Republic. The runway is just south of the town.

== See also ==
- Transport in the Central African Republic
- List of airports in the Central African Republic
