= Mobaye Mbanga Airport =

- IATA: none; ICAO: FEFE

Summary
- Airport type: Public
- Serves: Mobaye, Central African Republic
- Elevation AMSL: 1,332 ft / 406 m
- Coordinates: 4°22′30″N 21°08′00″E

Map
- Location of Mobaye Mbanga Airport in the Central African Republic

Runways
Direction	Length		Surface
Direction	m	ft	Surface
03/21	1,960	6,430	Laterite
- Source: Landings.com

Mobaye Mbanga Airport (ICAO: FEFE) is an airport serving Mobaye, a town on the Ubangi River in the Basse-Kotto prefecture of the Central African Republic. The airport is 7 kilometres (4.3 mi) downstream from the town.

== See also ==
- Transport in the Central African Republic
- List of airports in the Central African Republic
