= GDA =

GDA may refer to:

- Generic Design Assessment, UK assessment process for new nuclear reactor designs
- Global Development Alliance, a program of the United States Agency for International Development
- GNU Data Access, a software API specification
- Golden Disc Awards, an annual South Korean major music awards ceremony
- Golden Dome for America, a planned missile defense system
- Gounda Airport, in the Central African Republic
- Grand Democratic Alliance, a political alliance in Pakistan
- Greater Dublin Area, a region of Ireland
- Grupo de Diarios América, an international trade organization
- Guideline Daily Amount in the United Kingdom
- Gwadar Development Authority, in Gwadar, Pakistan
- GDA (gene), which encodes the enzyme guanine deaminase
- Giornate degli Autori, independent section of the Venice Film Festival
- GDA, also known as Grupo de Amigos.
