= Gordil Airport =

- IATA: GDI; ICAO: FEGL

Summary
- Airport type: Private
- Serves: Gordil, Central African Republic
- Location: Melle
- Elevation AMSL: 1,427 ft / 435 m
- Coordinates: 9°35′00″N 21°44′00″E

Map
- Location of Gordil Airport in the Central African Republic

Runways
Direction	Length		Surface
Direction	m	ft	Surface
12/30	980	3,215	Laterite
- Source: Landings.com Google Maps GCM

Gordil Airport (IATA: GDI, ICAO: FEGL) is an airstrip serving Gordil, a village in the Vakaga prefecture of the Central African Republic. The airstrip is 5 kilometres (3.1 mi) southeast of Gordil alongside the RN8 road in the northern part of Manovo-Gounda St. Floris National Park.

The runway is unusable during the rainy season, and aircraft have to do steep departures and landings in order not to disturb the wildlife in the park. The east end of the runway overruns onto the RN8 road.

== See also ==
- Transport in the Central African Republic
- List of airports in the Central African Republic
