= Bania, Central African Republic =

Bania
- Location in Central African Republic
- Coordinates: 4°0′23″N 16°6′46″E
- Country: Central African Republic
- Prefecture: Mambéré-Kadéï
- Sub-prefecture: Berbérati
- Commune: Basse-Mambéré

Bania is a village located in Mambéré-Kadéï Prefecture, Central African Republic.

== History ==
Pierre Savorgnan de Brazza established a post in Bania in January 1892. In 1895, a sleeping sickness outbreak occurred in Bania and wiped out 30% of the residents. Örebro Mission founded a station in Bania in 1923.

Anti-balaka militias from Carnot and Bouar attacked Bania in February 2014 and killed two Muslim leaders, resulting in the Muslim residents fleeing to the bush. Moreover, 80% of the residents fled Bania and only returned three months later with the arrival of international forces. In early 2015, Anti-balaka demolished a mosque in Bania to prevent the Muslims from returning to the village.

Fifty 3R rebels captured Bania on 31 December 2021 and torched several houses. The locals sought refuge in the bush due to the presence of the 3R.

== Economy ==
Gold and diamond mining and logging are the main economic activities in the village.

== Education ==
Bania has two schools.

== Healthcare ==
The village has one health center.

== Bibliographies ==
- Amnesty International (31 July 2015). Erased identity: Muslims in ethnically-cleansed areas of the Central African Republic (PDF) (Report).
- Première Urgence (31 July 2015). EVALUATION RRM Bania, Balego, Yamando et Mboussa Préfectures de la Mambéré Kadéi et Sangha Mbaéré 23 au 26 juin 2015 Rapport d’évaluation (PDF) (Report).
