= Ouanda Djallé Airport =

- IATA: ODJ; ICAO: FEGO

Summary
- Airport type: Public
- Serves: Ouanda Djallé
- Elevation AMSL: 1,985 ft / 605 m
- Coordinates: 08°54′25″N 22°47′50″E

Map
- Location of Ouanda Djallé Airport in the Central African Republic

Runways
Direction	Length		Surface
Direction	m	ft	Surface
14/32	1,300	4,265	Grass
- Source: Landings.com Google Maps GCM

Ouanda Djallé Airport (IATA: ODJ, ICAO: FEGO) is an airstrip serving Ouanda Djallé, a village in the Vakaga prefecture of the Central African Republic. The airstrip lies alongside the RN5 road that runs northwest out of the village.

There is a large hill 3 kilometres (1.9 mi) southeast of the airstrip.

== See also ==
- Transport in the Central African Republic
- List of airports in the Central African Republic
