= Mambéré =

Prefecture of the Central African Republic

- Prefecture
- Mambéré in the Central African Republic
- Country: Central African Republic
- Capital: Carnot

Government
  - Prefect: Guy Arnold Clemenceau

Area
  - Total: 15,740 km^{2} (6,080 sq mi)

Population (2024 estimation)
  - Total: 324,406
  - Density: 20.61/km^{2} (53.38/sq mi)

Mambéré [mɑ̃.be.ʁe] is a prefecture in the Central African Republic. In 2024, the prefecture had a population of around 324,406 inhabitants.

Mambéré has a size of 15,740 km^{2}. Carnot is the capital of the prefecture. It is named for the Mambéré River.

== History ==
Together with Lim-Pendé and Ouham Fafa, Mambéré Prefecture was established on 10 December 2020. Previously all sub-prefectures and communes of Mambéré were part of Mambéré-Kadéï.

== Administration ==
Mambéré was divided into four sub-prefectures and five communes:

Sub Prefecture	Commune	Population (2022 estimation)
Carnot	Carnot	159 987
Amada-Gaza	Haute-Boumbé	15 151
Gadzi	Topia	54 598
Gadzi	Mbali	17 473
Senkpa-Mbaéré	Senkpa-Mbaéré	18 270
