= Gboyo River =

River in the Central African Republic

Coordinates: 5.642°N 23.077°E

Gboyo is a river of the Central African Republic. It flows through the town of Bakouma.

The Gboyo is a potentially excellent source for hydro electric power in Bakouma. The pico hydro power station (PCH) is situated on the left bank of the river.

== Sources ==
- Esi-africa.com
