= Bossembélé Airport =

- IATA: BEM; ICAO: FEFL

Summary
- Airport type: Defunct
- Serves: Bossembélé, Central African Republic
- Elevation AMSL: 2,211 ft / 674 m
- Coordinates: 5°16′01″N 17°37′59″E

Map
- Location of Bossembélé Airport in the Central African Republic

Runways
Direction	Length		Surface
Direction	ft	m	Surface
Closed
- Source: Google Maps OurAirports

Bossembélé Airport (IATA: BEM, ICAO: FEFL) was an airstrip located within Bossembélé, a town in the Ombella-M'Poko prefecture of the Central African Republic. Mature trees now overhang the former runway.

== See also ==
- Transport in the Central African Republic
- List of airports in the Central African Republic
