= Monasao =

- Location in Central African Republic
- Coordinates: 3°15′35″N 16°14′53″E
- Country: Central African Republic
- Prefecture: Sangha-Mbaéré
- Sub-prefecture: Bayanga
- Commune: Yobe-Sangha

Population (2021)
  - Total: 2,458

Monasao, also spelled Monassao, is a village situated in Sangha-Mbaéré Prefecture, Central African Republic.

== History ==
A French missionary, Renè Ripoche, established Monassao in 1975 to settle Baka people.

== Demographics ==
In the early period, the village was mainly inhabited by Baka people. Currently, Monasao is not solely settled by Pygmy, but also by Bantus. A Catholic mission is present in Monasao, and it covers four villages.

== Education ==
There is a primary school in Monasao.

== Healthcare ==
Monasao has one health center.
