= Carnot Airport =

Carnot Airport Aéroport de Carnot
- IATA: CRF; ICAO: FEFC

Summary
- Airport type: Public
- Owner: Government
- Serves: Carnot, Central African Republic
- Elevation AMSL: 1,985 ft (605 m)
- Coordinates: 4°56′20″N 15°53′37″E

Map
- Location of Carnot Airport in the Central African Republic

Runways
Direction	Length		Surface
Direction	m	ft	Surface
17/35	1,205	3,953	Grass
- Source: Landings.com Google Maps GCM

Carnot Airport (French: Aéroport de Carnot, English: /kɑːrˈnoʊ/ kar-NOH) (IATA: CRF, ICAO: FEFC) is an airstrip serving Carnot, a city in the Mambéré-Kadéï prefecture of the Central African Republic. The runway is on the western edge of the city.

The Berberati VOR (Ident: BT) is located 42.8 nautical miles (79.3 km) south of the airstrip.

== See also ==
- Transport in the Central African Republic
- List of airports in the Central African Republic
