= List of airlines of the Central African Republic =

This is a list of airlines currently operating in the Central African Republic:

Airline	IATA	ICAO	Callsign	Image
Invicta Air Cargo				
Karinou Airlines	U5	KRN		
Via Air				

== See also ==
- List of airlines
- List of defunct airlines of Africa
