= Bouca Airport =

Airport in Central African Republic

- IATA: BCF; ICAO: FEGU

Summary
- Airport type: Private
- Serves: Bouca, Central African Republic
- Elevation AMSL: 1,532 ft / 467 m
- Coordinates: 6°31′00″N 18°16′21″E

Map
- Location of Bouca Airport in the Central African Republic

Runways
Direction	Length		Surface
Direction	m	ft	Surface
17/35	1,220	4,003	Grass
- Source: Landings.com Google Maps GCM

Bouca Airport (IATA: BCF, ICAO: FEGU) is an airstrip serving Bouca, a village in the Ouham prefecture of the Central African Republic.

The airstrip is within the northern section of the village, alongside the RN4 road. There are houses close to the south end of the runway.

== See also ==
- Transport in the Central African Republic
- List of airports in the Central African Republic
