= Zémio Airport =

- IATA: IMO; ICAO: FEFZ

Summary
- Airport type: Public
- Owner: Government
- Serves: Zémio, Central African Republic
- Elevation AMSL: 1,995 ft (608 m)
- Coordinates: 05°02′12″N 25°08′55″E

Map
- Location of the airport in Central African Republic

Runways
Direction	Length		Surface
Direction	m	ft	Surface
05/23	1,335	4,380	Dirt
- Sources: GCM Google Maps

Zémio Airport (IATA: IMO, ICAO: FEFZ) is an airport serving the village of Zémio, in the Haut-Mbomou prefecture of the Central African Republic. The airport is located just northeast of the village.

== See also ==
- Transport in the Central African Republic
- List of airports in the Central African Republic
