= M'Boki Airport =

- IATA: MKI; ICAO: FEGE

Summary
- Airport type: Public
- Serves: Obo, Central African Republic
- Elevation AMSL: 2,136 ft / 651 m
- Coordinates: 5°19′58″N 25°55′55″E

Map
- Location of M'Boki Airport in the Central African Republic

Runways
Direction	Length		Surface
Direction	m	ft	Surface
09/27	1,750	5,741	Dirt
- Source: Landings.com Google Maps GCM

M'Boki Airport (IATA: MKI, ICAO: FEGE) is an airport serving Obo and Mboki, a village in the Haut-Mbomou prefecture of the Central African Republic. The runway is 3 kilometres (2 mi) northwest of the village of M'boki and about 60 kilometres (37 mi) west of Obo, the capital of Haut-Mbomou prefecture.

== See also ==
- Transport in the Central African Republic
- List of airports in the Central African Republic
