= N'Délé Airport =

- IATA: NDL; ICAO: FEFN

Summary
- Airport type: Public
- Serves: N'Délé, Central African Republic
- Elevation AMSL: 1,677 ft / 511 m
- Coordinates: 8°25′35″N 20°38′07″E

Map
- Location of N'Délé Airport in the Central African Republic

Runways
Direction	Length		Surface
Direction	m	ft	Surface
17/35	1,509	4,951	Grass
- Source: Landings.com Google Maps GCM

N'Délé Airport (IATA: NDL, ICAO: FEFN) is an airport serving N'Délé, a town in the Bamingui-Bangoran prefecture of the Central African Republic. The airport is on the northwest edge of the town.

The Ndele VOR (Ident: LE)is located 3.5 nautical miles (6.5 km) east-southeast of the airport.

== See also ==
- Transport in the Central African Republic
- List of airports in the Central African Republic
