= Bambari Airport =

- IATA: BBY; ICAO: FEFM

Summary
- Airport type: Public
- Serves: Bambari, Central African Republic
- Elevation AMSL: 1,558 ft / 475 m
- Coordinates: 5°50′50″N 20°39′00″E

Map
- Location of Bambari Airport in the Central African Republic

Runways
Direction	Length		Surface
Direction	m	ft	Surface
09/27	1,600	5,249	Dirt
- Source: Landings.com Google Maps GCM

Bambari Airport (IATA: BBY, ICAO: FEFM) is an airport serving Bambari, a city in the Ouaka prefecture of the Central African Republic.

The airport is in the countryside 9 kilometres (5.6 mi) north-northwest of Bambari, on the opposite side of the Ouaka River.

The Bambari non-directional beacon (Ident: BM) is located on the field.

== See also ==
- Transport in the Central African Republic
- List of airports in the Central African Republic
