= Batangafo Airport =

Airport in Batangafo, Central African Republic

- IATA: BTG; ICAO: FEGF

Summary
- Airport type: Public
- Serves: Batangafo, Central African Republic
- Elevation AMSL: 1,378 ft / 420 m
- Coordinates: 7°18′50″N 18°18′30″E

Map
- Location of Batangafo Airport in the Central African Republic

Runways
Direction	Length		Surface
Direction	m	ft	Surface
05/23	1,055	3,461	Grass
- Source: Landings.com Google Maps GCM

Batangafo Airport (IATA: BTG, ICAO: FEGF) is an airport serving Batangafo, a city on the Ouham River in the Ouham prefecture of the Central African Republic. The airport is on the northeastern edge of the city, just off the RN4 road.

== See also ==
- Transport in the Central African Republic
- List of airports in the Central African Republic
