= Rafaï Airport =

Airport in Central African Republic

- IATA: RFA; ICAO: FEGR

Summary
- Airport type: Public
- Owner: Government
- Serves: Rafaï
- Elevation AMSL: 1,759 ft / 536 m
- Coordinates: 4°59′20″N 23°55′41″E

Map
- Location of Rafaï Airport in the Central African Republic

Runways
Direction	Length		Surface
Direction	m	ft	Surface
01/19	1,260	4,134	Grass
- Source: Landings.com Google maps GCM

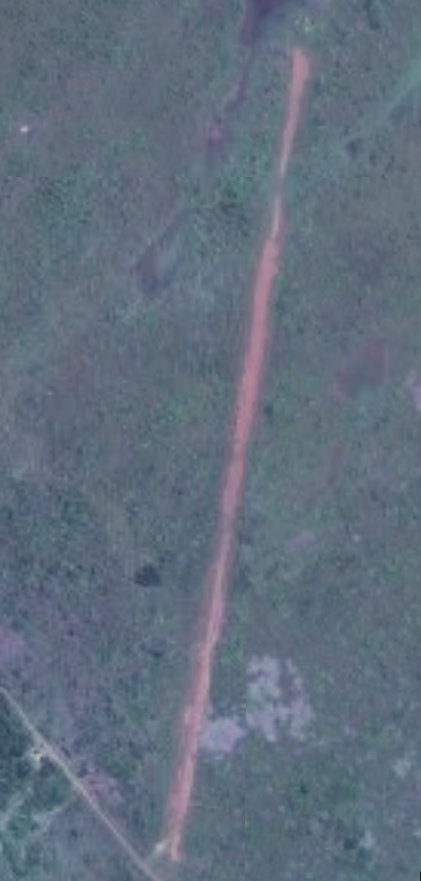
Aerial photograph of Rafaï Airport

Rafaï Airport (IATA: RFA, ICAO: FEGR) is an airstrip serving Rafaï, a village in the Mbomou prefecture of the Central African Republic. Rafaï village lines the RN2 road, and the runway is located mid-village just off the road.

== See also ==
- Transport in the Central African Republic
- List of airports in the Central African Republic
