= Birao Airport =

- IATA: IRO; ICAO: FEFI

Summary
- Airport type: Public
- Serves: Birao, Central African Republic
- Elevation AMSL: 1,522 ft / 464 m
- Coordinates: 10°14′15″N 22°43′00″E

Map
- Location of Birao Airport in the Central African Republic

Runways
Direction	Length		Surface
Direction	m	ft	Surface
06/24	1,805	5,922	Dirt
- Source: Landings.com Google Maps GCM

Birao Airport (IATA: IRO, ICAO: FEFI) is a rural airstrip serving Birao, a village in the Vakaga prefecture of the Central African Republic. The runway is 10 kilometres (6.2 mi) southwest of the village.

The Birao non-directional beacon (Ident: BO) is located 4.7 nautical miles (8.7 km) east-northeast of the airstrip.

== See also ==
- Transport in the Central African Republic
- List of airports in the Central African Republic
