= Bakouma Airport =

- IATA: BMF; ICAO: FEGM

Summary
- Airport type: Public
- Serves: Bakouma, Central African Republic
- Elevation AMSL: 1,640 ft / 500 m
- Coordinates: 5°41′38″N 22°48′00″E

Map
- Location of Bakouma Airport in the Central African Republic

Runways
Direction	Length		Surface
Direction	m	ft	Surface
08/26	1,200	3,937	Grass
- Source: Landings.com Google Maps GCM

Bakouma Airport (IATA: BMF, ICAO: FEGM) is an airstrip serving Bakouma, a village in the Mbomou prefecture of the Central African Republic. The airstrip is 2 kilometres (1 mi) east of the village along the RR18 road.

== See also ==
- Transport in the Central African Republic
- List of airports in the Central African Republic
