= N6 road (Central African Republic) =

Road in Central African Republic

N6 Road

Route information
- Maintained by Central African Republic National Highways Authority

Major junctions
- North end: Bangui
- South end: Gamboula (CAM)

Location
- Country: Central African Republic

Highway system
- Transport in the Central African Republic

The N6 road also designated as RN6, is a national route in Central African Republic which is situated in the southwestern region of the country. The 600-kilometer-long road connects the capital city of Bangui to the border with Cameroon at Gamboula, serving as a transportation link between the two countries. The N6 serves trade, travel, and communication between the Central African Republic and Cameroon.

== Route ==
The N6 traverses the extreme southwest of the Central African Republic, a region characterized by tropical rainforests. The road originates in the capital city of Bangui and extends southwest to Mbaïki, covering a distance of over 100 kilometers, with this initial segment being paved. From Mbaïki, the N6 turns northwest, passing through Carnot, before curving south to Berbérati, and finally proceeding west to the border with Cameroon at Gamboula. Upon crossing into Cameroon, the N10 continues, providing a connection to major cities such as Bertoua and Yaoundé, facilitating regional trade and travel.

== History ==
In the 1960s, the southern route from Bangui to Douala, Cameroon, was considered the optimal option for a road link, given the Central African Republic's landlocked status and reliance on foreign ports for exports. Between 1969 and 1972, the World Bank financed the country's first major road project, paving the N6 from Bangui to Mbaïki. This marked the country's inaugural paved road. However, the N6's southern location in a high-precipitation climate, combined with its jungle terrain, made maintenance and year-round passability challenging. Consequently, focus shifted in the 1970s to the northern route via the N1-N3 to Cameroon. The remaining sections of the N6 have not been paved since. Due to the long distances, poor dirt road conditions, and limited facilities, the N6 is seldom used for travel from Bangui to Cameroon.
