= Bria Airport =

- IATA: BIV; ICAO: FEFR

Summary
- Airport type: Public
- Serves: Bria, Central African Republic
- Elevation AMSL: 1,916 ft / 584 m
- Coordinates: 6°31′45″N 21°59′20″E

Map
- Location of Bria Airport in the Central African Republic

Runways
Direction	Length		Surface
Direction	m	ft	Surface
14/32	1,722	5,650	Dirt
- Source: Landings.com Google Maps GCM

Bria Airport (IATA: BIV, ICAO: FEFR) is an airport serving Bria, a town on the Kotto River in the Haute-Kotto prefecture of the Central African Republic. The airport is in the southern section of the town.

The Bria VOR (Ident: IA) is located on the field.

== See also ==
- Transport in the Central African Republic
- List of airports in the Central African Republic
