= Bangassou Airport =

- IATA: BGU; ICAO: FEFG

Summary
- Airport type: Public
- Serves: Bangassou, Central African Republic
- Elevation AMSL: 1,640 ft / 500 m
- Coordinates: 4°47′08″N 22°47′00″E

Map
- Location of Bangassou Airport in the Central African Republic

Runways
Direction	Length		Surface
Direction	m	ft	Surface
09/27	1,805	5,922	Grass
- Source: Landings.com Google Maps GCM

Bangassou Airport (IATA: BGU, ICAO: FEFG) is an airport serving Bangassou, a city on the Mbomou River in the Mbomou prefecture of the Central African Republic. The Mbomou River forms the local border with the Democratic Republic of the Congo.

The airport is 5 kilometres (3.1 mi) northwest of the city, near the Mbari River, a tributary of the Mbomou.

== See also ==
- Transport in the Central African Republic
- List of airports in the Central African Republic
