= Gordil =

- Location in the Central African Republic
- Coordinates: 9°36′36″N 21°40′51″E
- Country: Central African Republic
- Prefecture: Vakaga
- Sub-Prefecture: Birao
- Commune: Ouandja
- Time zone: UTC+1 (WAT)

Gordil is a town in the Vakaga Prefecture of the northern Central African Republic.

== History ==
In 1962, Gordil had a population of 264 people.

From 25-26 June 2006, a battle took place in Gordil between joint FACA-FOMUC force and Chadian rebels of FUC and MPRD which caused casualties. This battle led to the death of 20 rebels, 11 FACA soldiers, and 2 Chadian soldiers.

On 11 March 2022, Wagner Group and FACA entered Gordil to conduct door-to-door operations and killed 15 people. On 11 April 2022, Wagner Group and FACA visited Gordil. They killed 22 people and burned houses. On 23 May 2022, Wagner Group revisited Gordil and stayed for three days. During the three days of Wagner's presence, they looted shops.

== Demography ==
Goula makes up the majority of the town population.

== Transport ==
The town is served by Gordil Airport.
