= Bambio =

- Sub-prefecture and town
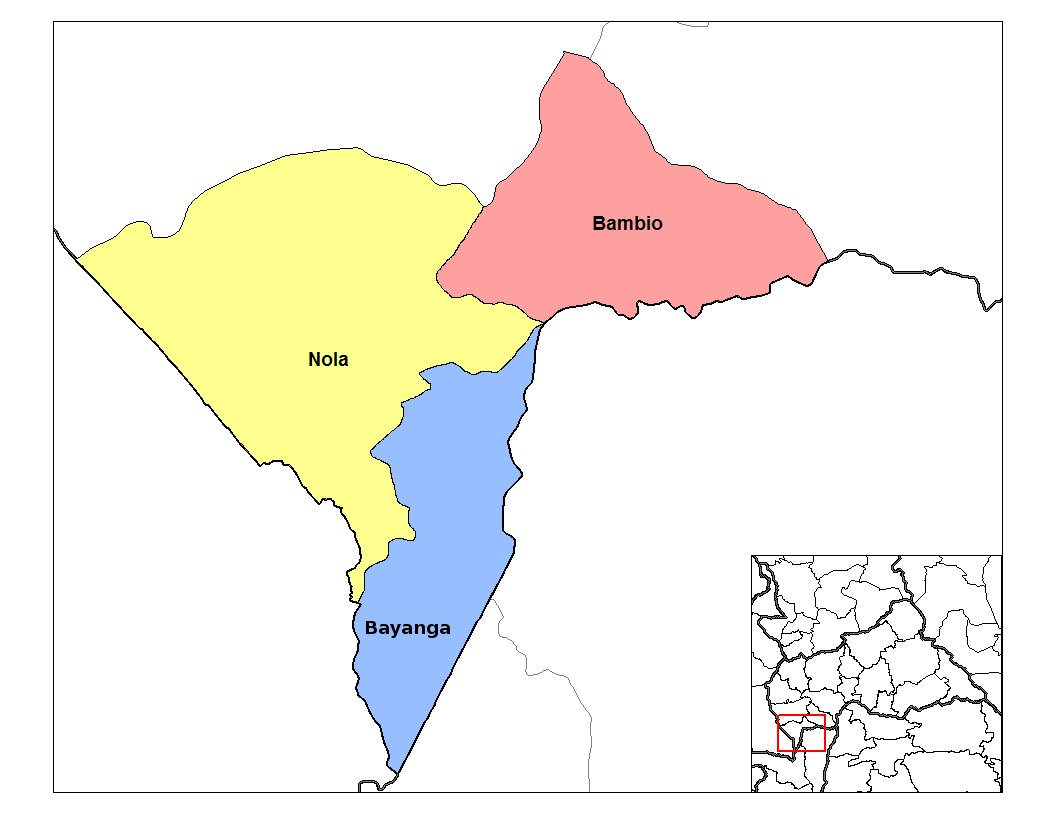
- Sub-prefectures of Sangha-Mbaéré

- Location in the Central African Republic
- Coordinates: 3°54′N 16°59′E
- Country: Central African Republic
- Prefecture: Sangha-Mbaéré

Government
  - Sub-Prefect: Yackyz Poubolo Memory
- Time zone: UTC+1 (WAT)

Bambio is a sub-prefecture and town in the Sangha-Mbaéré Prefecture of the south-west Central African Republic.
