= Bangui M'Poko International Airport =

International airport serving Bangui, Central African Republic

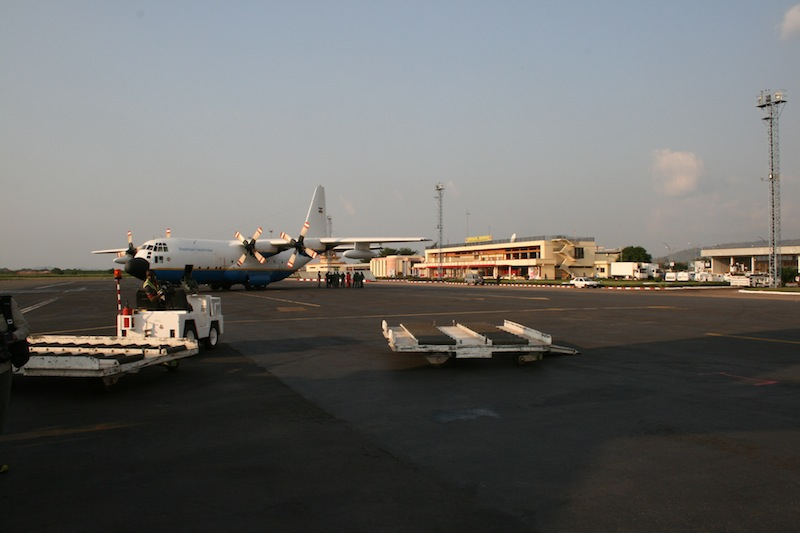
- Airport tarmac
- IATA: BGF; ICAO: FEFF

Summary
- Airport type: Public
- Owner: Government
- Serves: Bangui
- Opened: 1967
- Elevation AMSL: 1,208 ft / 368 m
- Coordinates: 04°23′54.51″N 018°31′07.63″E
- Website: https://www.aeroport-bangui.com/bangui_international_airport.php

Map

Runways
Direction	Length		Surface
Direction	ft	m	Surface
16/34	8,530	2,600	Asphalt

Statistics (2014)
- Passengers: 11,600

Bangui M'Poko International Airport (IATA: BGF, ICAO: FEFF) is an international airport located seven kilometres (4 nautical miles) northwest of Bangui, the capital of the Central African Republic. It is owned by the government of the Central African Republic. The airport is situated at an elevation of 368 meters (1,208 feet) and has a single asphalt runway, designated 17/35, measuring 2,600 meters in length and 45 meters in width (8,530 feet × 148 feet). The airport has two boarding gates, a food concession, a bar, and a first aid center. Car rental services are also available.

In 2004, the airport served 53,862 passengers. In 2012, the airport had an average attendance of about 120,000 passengers, despite a maximum capacity of 10,000 passengers.

The airport was an unofficial refugee camp for some 60,000 refugees as of May 2014. In 2017, the airport was functioning under the supervision of UN aviation officials.

Currently, airlines operating flights at Bangui M'Poko International Airport include ASKY Airlines, Royal Air Maroc, and Air Côte d'Ivoire, among others.

== Expansion ==
On March 12, 2009, during a technical briefing on the Bangui M'Poko Airport rehabilitation project held by the Central African Ministry of Transport and Civil Aviation, the project leader stated that the airport's facilities had not been updated since it began operations in 1967. With the socio-economic development of the Central African Republic, passenger traffic surged from 32,000 in 2003 to nearly 100,000 in 2008, far exceeding the airport's capacity. In response, the French Development Agency funded a feasibility study to assess the potential for enhancing the airport's infrastructure. According to the proposed expansion and renovation plan, the project would be carried out in two phases and require funding of €4 million (approximately 9 billion CFA francs). The African Development Bank agreed to finance the project, provided it meets the standards set by the International Civil Aviation Organization (ICAO).

== Airlines and destinations ==
Airlines	Destinations
AfriJet	Libreville, Yaounde
ASKY Airlines	Douala, Lomé
Ethiopian Airlines	Addis Ababa
Royal Air Maroc	Casablanca
RwandAir	Kigali

== Statistics ==
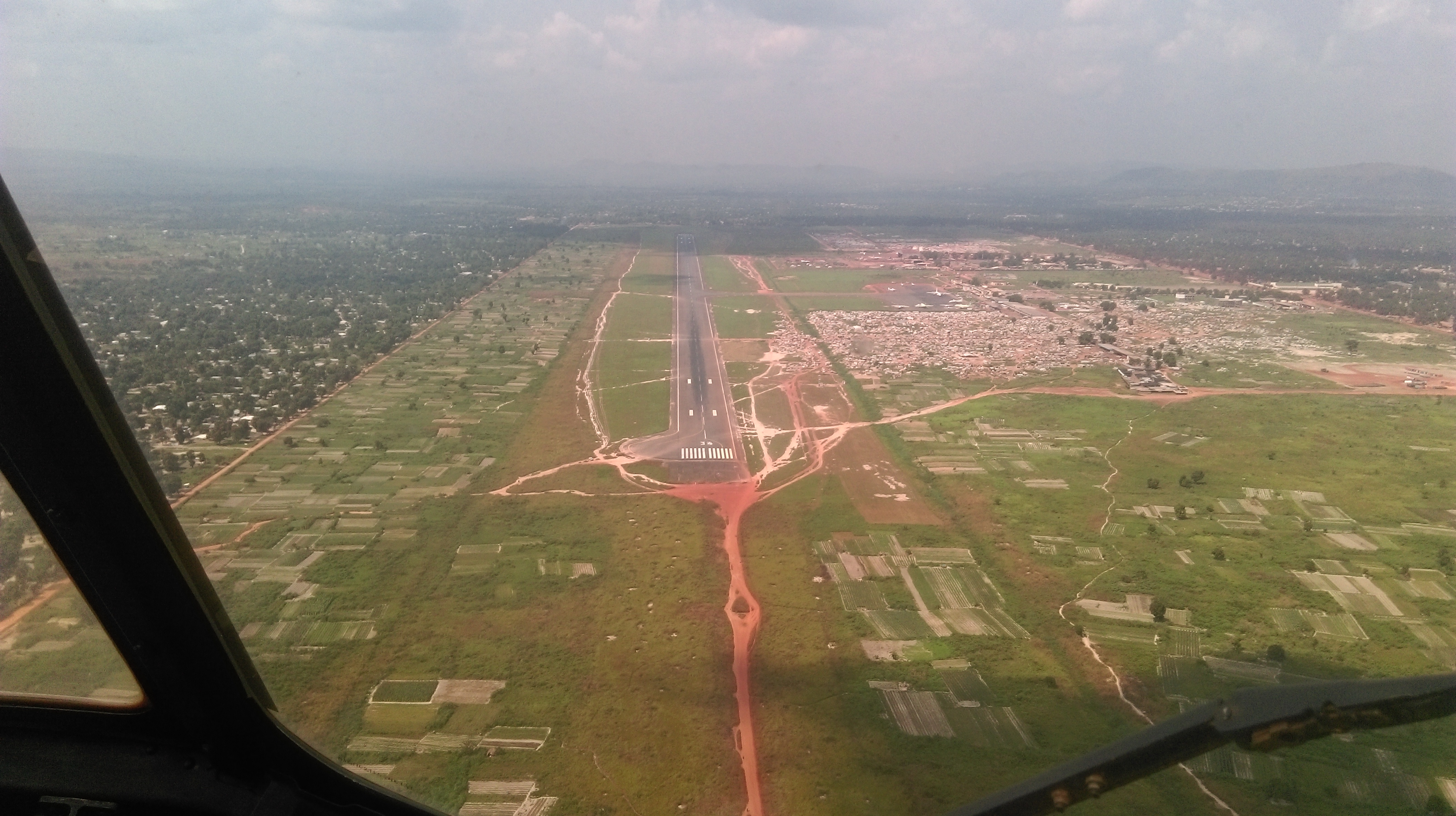
Runway

Year	Total passengers	Increase	Freight (tons)	Total aircraft movements
2003	12,666		50	1,178
2004	53,862	76.8%	105	3,871
2005	52,854	–0.4%	905	4,722
2006	66,058	15.9%	2,152	5,609
2007	97,633	37.2%	2,841	7,258
2008	107,079	4.4%	2,885	7,049

== See also ==
- List of airports in the Central African Republic
- List of the busiest airports in Africa
- Transport in the Central African Republic
