= Ouanda Djallé =

- town
- Location within Central African Republic
- Coordinates: 8°54′N 22°48′E
- Country: Central African Republic
- Prefecture: Vakaga

Government
  - Sultan: Massanguiya Grebaye Abdallah
  - Sub-prefect: Idriss Kouzougala
- Elevation: 697 m (2,287 ft)

Population (2003)
  - Total: 2,839

Ouanda Djallé is a sub-prefecture and town in the prefecture of Vakaga in the Central African Republic. It is located 130 km south of Birao. By population it is one of the smallest sub-prefectures in the country (only Bambouti and Djémah are smaller).

== History ==
The modern town was founded by Captain Souclier in December 1912 after the fall of the last redoubt of resistance in Dar al Kuti. In May 1913, it became a subdivision comprising the area of Birao, and during the following years it came to be a part of the sub-divisions of Haute-Kotto and Dar-Kouti Oriental. In 1914 the town was temporarily abandoned after destruction by fire. After independence the town became a control post within the autonomous sub-prefecture of Birao. The current division was finally imposed in November 1964.

On 10 November 2006, rebels from the previously unknown Union of Democratic Forces for Unity seized Ouanda Djallé. They had started their offensive two weeks earlier at the capital of the Vakaga prefecture, Birao, where 50-60 rebels managed to chase away 60 government soldiers posted in the city. They then took nine vehicles, including two pick-ups mounted with 14.5 mm heavy machine guns that were left by the government troops and continued south towards Ouanda Djallé. During the following weeks the troops seized not only Ouanda Djallé, but also neighbouring sub-prefectures Birao, N'Délé and Ouadda. All of these towns were finally taken back by the Central African Republic military force, supported by French troops on 27 November. At the time of defeat, the rebel soldiers were in Mouka, on their way to Bria.

On 5 September 2010, Ouanda Djallé was attacked by LRA. They killed 12 civilians and abducted 44 town residents as well as two humanitarian workers. Besides, LRA burned hundreds of houses and looted the clinic. In retaliation for the raid, UFDR attacked LRA.

Following the Séléka takeover of the country in 2013 Ouadda Djalle had been under control of ex-Séléka armed groups, including FPRC, RPRC and UPC which used the town to tax movement of goods from Sudan. On 27 May 2022 groups of soldiers was deployed in Ouanda Djalle. On 17 June coalition of FPRC, UPC and RPRC rebels recaptured the town after clashes with armed forces. Armed forces recaptured the town on 26 June.

== Geography and climate ==
During the last 20 years the Sahel area has spread closer and closer to Ouanda Djallé. In the mid-1990s, the border was said to be halfway between Birao and Ouanda Djallé. Ouanda Djallé is located on the Bongo Massif and its peak Mont Toussoro (1330m) is east of Ouanda Djallé.

The town is located close to the Sudanese border, about 75 km from South Darfur.

== Transport ==
The town is a bit isolated from the rest of the country. Most people live in the western parts of the Central African Republic, and this town is located far from the capital, dependent on bad roads. It has an airfield [ODJ] Info, located parallel to the RN5 main road.
