= Bakouma =

- Sub-prefecture and town
- Location within Central African Republic
- Coordinates: 5°41′55″N 22°47′0″E
- Country: Central African Republic
- Prefecture: Mbomou

Government
  - Sub-Prefect: Serge Didier Kamegba Makimba
  - Mayor: Sylvain Ngoualima
- Elevation: 500 m (1,600 ft)

Population (2003)
  - Total: 17,599

Bakouma is a sub-prefecture in the prefecture of Mbomou in Central African Republic. The area is known for its prosperity of mineral resources which have for a long time remained unexploited.

== History ==
Bakouma was founded in September 1892 when the Belgians, led by Commander Georges Adolphe Balat and Captain Georges Le Marinel set up a military post on the site. It became a part of the French Upper Oubangui in July 1894. Bakouma became a district under the French rule in 1944 and on 23 January 1961, the region eventually became a Sous-Préfecture in the Mbomou prefecture in the newly formed Central African Republic.

The Lengo Petroglyphs are located near Bakouma.

In a uranium survey in 1959–1961, phosphatic sediments were discovered near Bakouma. The phosphates are characterized by their high uranium content, which are the highest in sub-Saharan Africa. Further feasibility studies showed that in the area, there are 41 million pounds of U_{3}O_{8} with an average grade of 0.27% (which is almost 20 times higher than the resources in Trekkopje, Namibia). A large concentration of Cretaceous ferruginous limestones has also been found near Bakouma. .

However, commercial exploitation in the area never took off. The French Commissariat à l'énergie atomique (CEA) studied the area, as did Alusuisse in the 1970s, which only came to conduct small scale mining. The Japanese in the 1980s came to the conclusion that any large exploitation would not be commercially viable.

During the 1990s, former political prisoner Jeanne-Marie Ruth-Rolland was elected deputy leader of Bakouma and lead a gold prospector's consortium. She was also active in diamond mining in the area. Following her death, a monument was elected in her honor.

Due to the increasing world market price on uranium, combined with decreasing stocks, the area gained new interest in the mid-2000s. Australian company Paladin Energy expressed its interest in the area, but it never took off. The same thing happened with the Chinese.

Finally, in May 2006, the South African company UraMin invested 90% in a Bakouma uranium project. The remaining 10% is held by the Government. A mining convention was signed, guaranteeing fixed taxes for 25 years. The project consists of ten separate areas of uranium mineralization and the consortium has applied for two additional licenses, which, if granted, would extend the project area to 2,900 square kilometres. A feasibility study that started in August 2006 has drilled some 9,400 meters and indicated that the resource is significantly deeper than previous studies have shown. The production is expected to ramp up from late 2009 and peak in 2010 at 3000 tonnes Per Annum.

=== Civil war ===
In July 2017 it was reported that Bakouma was under joint control of anti-balaka and FPRC rebel groups. From December 2018 to January 2019 heavy clashes took place in the city between ex-Séléka militias and government forces resulting in withdrawal of ex-Séléka militias.

Three UN peacekeepers from Burundi were killed in Dekoa and Bakouma on 26 December 2020, one day before the 2020 Central African general election. On 29 December government forces withdrew from Bakouma after being surrounded by FPRC and UPC rebels. On 10 May 2021 Bakouma was recaptured by government forces.

== Geography and climate ==
Bakouma is situated on the Gboyo River. In is on the northern end of the Mbomou forest, which has an area of 10.000 km^{2}.

When it became clear that the Government was going to allow for a concession of uranium, many voices were heard, mainly from the opposition, claiming that uranium mining in other countries has created much harm to the environment and the population. The Government claimed that this was the words of evil tongues. It said that the bill on the regulation of exploitation of radioactive minerals, which passed the Parliament on 30 August 2006, would protect from any such damage.

UraMin has started to drain the marches on its site.

== Law and government ==
Although the Government has its representative in Bakouma, the presence of UraMin in the town has attracted visits of several high-level government officials. When UraMin arrived with their first equipment to Bangui, the unloading of the airplane was monitored by the Minister of Mining and Energy, Sylvain Ndoutingaï. When the team later arrived in Bangassou with a second plane, the unloading was monitored by the prefect of Mboumou, Remy Sem Ndouto, along with representatives of the police, the gendarmerie, the customs and the armed forces. The customs was represented by Colonel Yvon Songue.

In March 2007, the UraMin site was inspected by the Director for the Ministry of Mining and Energy, Mr Guy Ngaïkomessé. Also present were the Regional Director for Mining, the Assistant Commander of the Mining Brigade, the Commander of the Mboumou Police Force as well as several police and gendarme officers. They found that the UraMin team consisted of six Tanzanians, two Europeans and one Cameroonian. The Tanzanians and the Cameroonian did not have visas for the country and were brought to Bangui for regularisation.

== Economy ==
3000 people are expected to be employed by UraMin and the Government has predicted a boom for the whole region. Numerous young men have left Bangassou, Nzako, Irabanda in Haute-Kotto for Bakouma. However, there has been reports that members of the Central African Government has arranged for transport of their own family members and own ethnic groups to Bakouma, to function as manpower in the mining project. This has led to irritation among Bakouma's original citizens.

Prices on food items are said to have exploded since the international mining companies arrived. While the normal price on chicken is said to be 600 or 700 CFA franc, it is now negotiated at between 1500 and 2000 CFA franc. Fish and beef can hardly be found at all.

There is a small hydro-power plant on the left bank of Gboyo, which is owned by the Catholic Diocese of Bangassou. The water flows of the river allows electricity production 305 days per year. The electricity is used to feed the mission and its hospital.

=== Transport ===
Bakouma is located about 870 km from Bangui. UraMin, which has its site 7 km outside of Bakouma has invested 0.5 million to upgrade road access, but it is unknown what other roads in the area will be upgraded. The Catholic Diocese of Bangassou has recently upgraded 19 bridges between Bakouma and Nzako.

There is an airstrip in Bakouma, close to the uranium exploitation. But when UraMin arrived with its machinery in July 2006, the Antonov freighter had to land at Bangassou, with a considerably longer runway.
