= Gounda =

- Location in the Central African Republic
- Coordinates: 9°3′N 21°12′E
- Country: Central African Republic
- Prefecture: Bamingui-Bangoran
- Sub-prefecture: N'Délé
- Time zone: UTC + 1

Gounda is a village in the Bamingui-Bangoran Prefecture in the northern Central African Republic.

== History ==
As of 2018 Gounda was under control of FPRC armed group. On 11 March 2022 rebels from FPRC and Russian mercenaries from the Wagner Group clashed in Gounda. Four Russians, six rebels and two civilians were killed. Rebels withdrew from the village and Russians continued to Gordile.
