= Karinou Airlines =

Central African airline

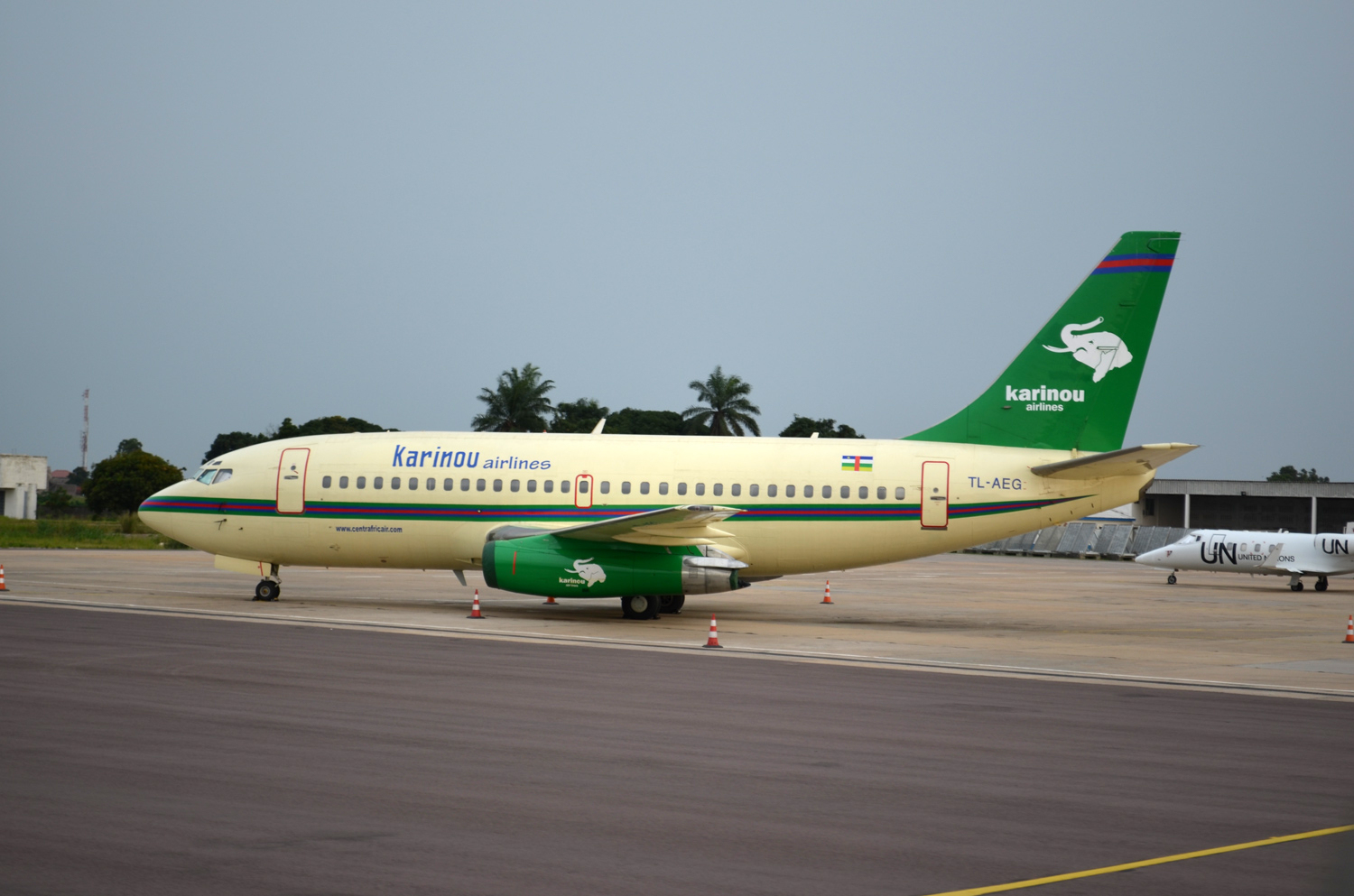
IATA	ICAO	Call sign
U5	KRN	-
- Commenced operations: 2012 as African Airlines
- Ceased operations: December 2019
- Hubs: Bangui M'Poko International Airport
- Focus cities: Bangui
- Fleet size: 2
- Destinations: 10
- Headquarters: Bangui, Central African Republic
- Website: karinouairlines.com (suspended)

Karinou Airlines was an airline based in Bangui, Central African Republic. It operated scheduled passenger services to a range of destinations across Africa.

== History ==
Karinou Airlines commenced charter operations under African Airlines. The business model was not working for the airline. Subsequently, less than one year later they rebranded as Karinou Airlines, changing their business model from charter to scheduled operations.

Shortly after the rebranding, in early 2013, Karinou Airlines began operating scheduled passenger flights to ten destinations across the African continent reportedly using a capital base of US$100 million.

In March 2013, after rebel fighters moved into Bangui, President Francois Bozizé was shown to have fled to the Democratic Republic of Congo on board a Karinou Airlines aircraft.

In August of 2013 the airline added its first Boeing 737-300.

== Destinations ==
Karinou Airlines serves the following destinations (as of August 2013):

Destinations
Country	City	Airport
Central African Republic	Bangui	Bangui M'Poko International Airport (hub)
Benin	Cotonou	Cadjehoun Airport
Cameroon	Douala	Douala International Airport
Cameroon	Yaoundé	Yaoundé Nsimalen International Airport
Chad	N'Djamena	N'Djamena International Airport
Democratic Republic of the Congo	Kinshasa	N'djili Airport
Equatorial Guinea	Malabo	Malabo International Airport
Gabon	Libreville	Léon-Mba International Airport
Republic of the Congo	Brazzaville	Maya-Maya Airport
Republic of the Congo	Pointe-Noire	Agostinho-Neto International Airport

== Fleet ==
The Karinou Airlines fleet consists of the following aircraft (as of August 2019):

Karinou Airlines fleet
Aircraft	In service	Order	Notes
Airbus A319-100	0	2	
Boeing 737-200	1	0	
Boeing 737-300	1	0	
Total	2	2	
