= Bouar =

Bouar Buar
- Town
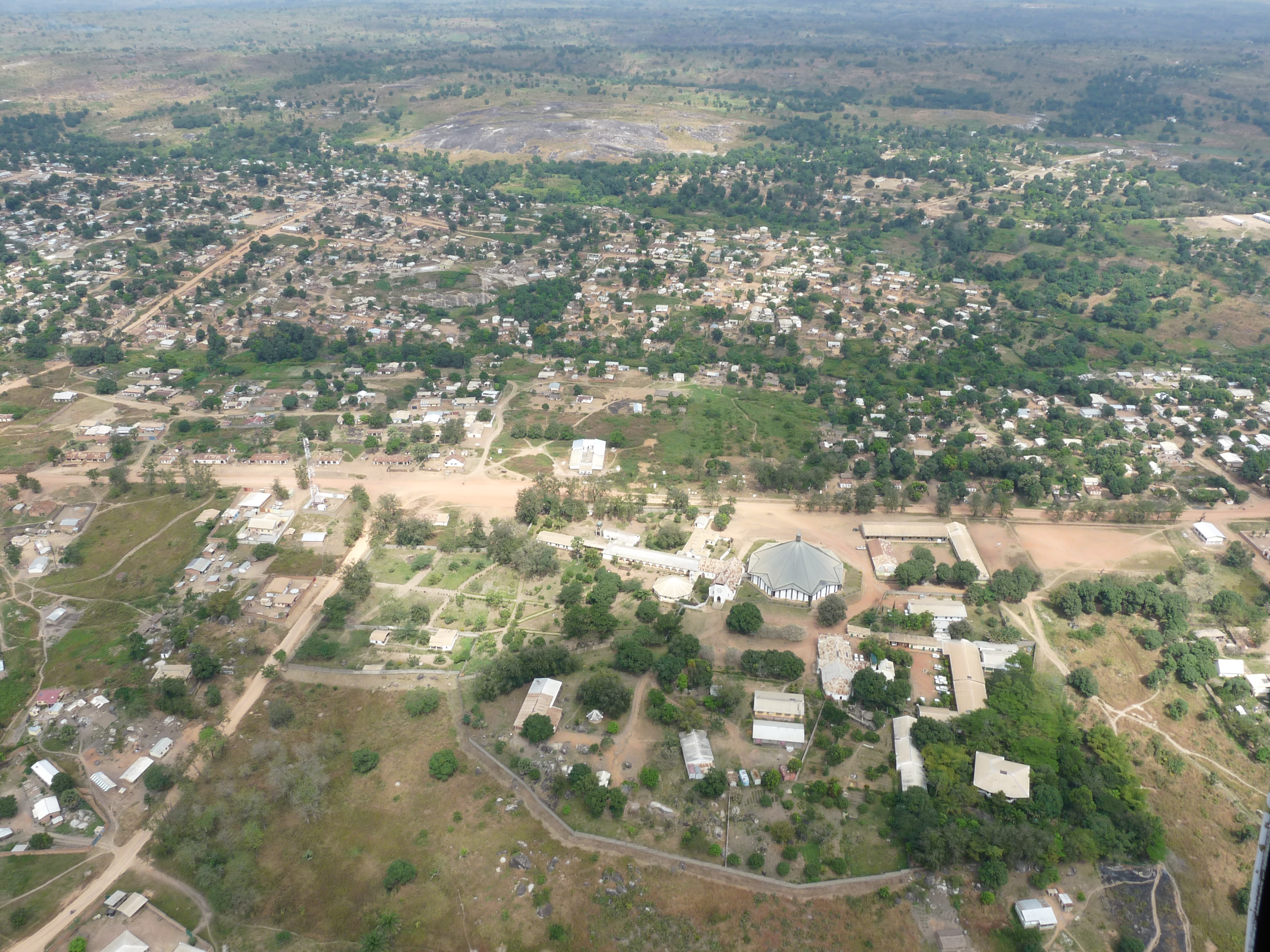
- Bouar

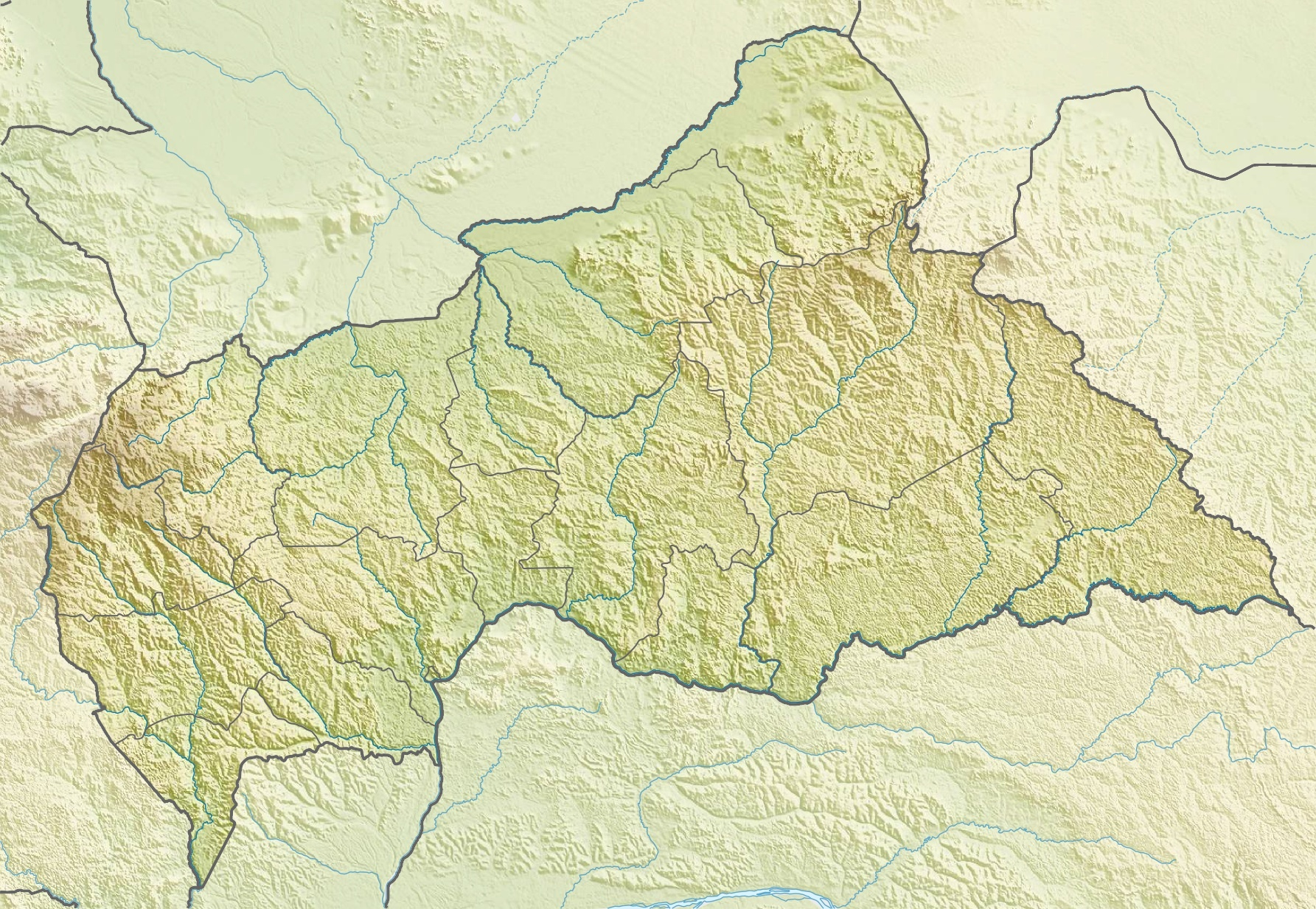
- Location in the Central African Republic
- Coordinates: 5°56′19″N 15°35′34″E
- Country: Central African Republic
- Prefecture: Nana-Mambéré

Government
  - Sub-prefect: Jean Michel Bouaka
  - Mayor: Dieu-Beni Massina
- Elevation: 1,046 m (3,432 ft)

Population (2012)
  - Total: 39,205
- Time zone: UTC+01:00 (WAT)

Bouar is a market town in the western Central African Republic, lying on the main road from Bangui (437 km) to the frontier with Cameroon (210 km). The city is the capital of Nana-Mambéré prefecture, has a population of 40,353, while the whole sous-préfecture has a population of 96,595 (2003 census). Bouar lies on a plateau almost 1000m above sea level and is known as the site of Camp Leclerc, a French military base.

About seventy groups of megaliths lie in the town and to its north and east. The Bouar Megaliths, dating back to the very late Neolithic Era (c. 3500–2700 BC) were added to the UNESCO World Heritage Tentative List on April 11, 2006 in the Cultural category.

The town's name comes from the Gbaya word for bean, hbouar.

== History ==
Hundreds of granite megaliths around Bouar were erected during the Late Stone Age by an ancient farming society. These stone megaliths are nowadays known as tanzunu in Gbaya.

The Gbaya people settled in the region around the 1500s. The settlement of Bouar itself was founded circa 1840 by chief Bogbafeï on the site of a bean field. His grandson, Mbarta, served as the chief between 1904 and 1916 and nowadays is remembered as a local hero.

In 1882, France invaded Central Africa and 1894, the borders of French Congo encompassed Bouar. In 1911, the area around Bouar was ceded by France to Germany under the terms of the Morocco-Congo Treaty, becoming part of the German colony of Neukamerun until it was reconquered by the French during World War I. The Germans eventually settled in the town around Christmas of 1913, where they constructed a military post and a road. In 1928, the town became part of the French colony of Ubangi-Shari.

The colonial town centre was occupied and burned down in the late 1920s by Gbaya rebels during the Kongo-Wara rebellion. This was the most significant period in which the Gbaya population and others resisted French colonial rule in Ubangi-Shari.

In 1948, the administrative centre of Ouham-Pendé prefecture was moved from Bozoum to Bouar. Later, the western part of the prefecture would become Nana-Mambéré prefecture with Bouar as its capital, while Bozoum would become the capital of the remaining Ouham-Pendé prefecture. Electricity was installed in Bouar in 1952. In 1960 the colony became independent as the Central African Republic.

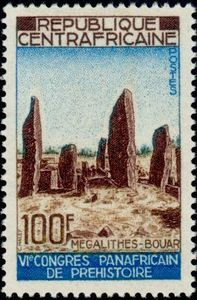
The ancient stone megaliths of Bouar depicted on a 1967 stamp.

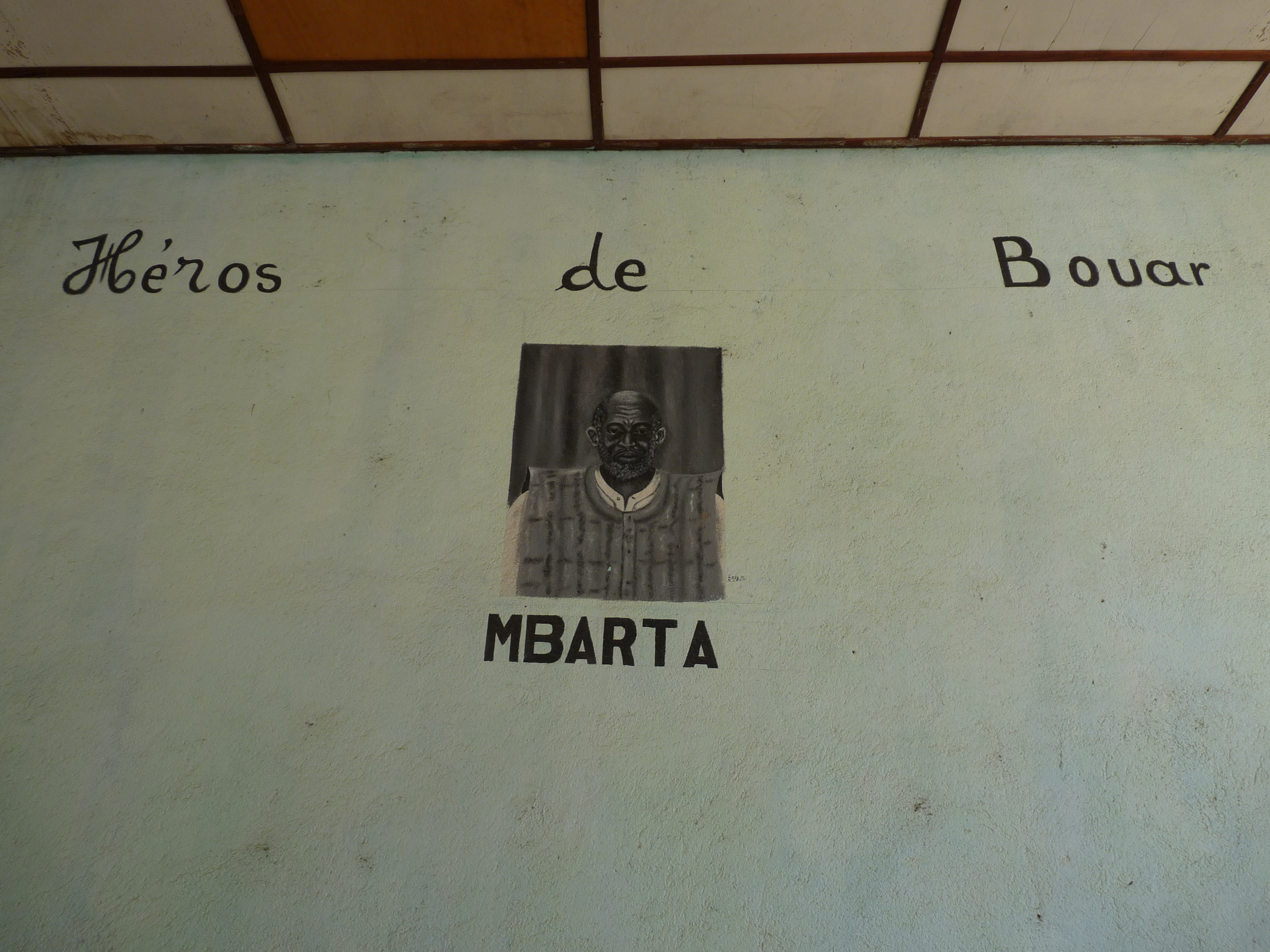
A portrait of chief Mbarta as a "Hero of Bouar" in the town's museum.

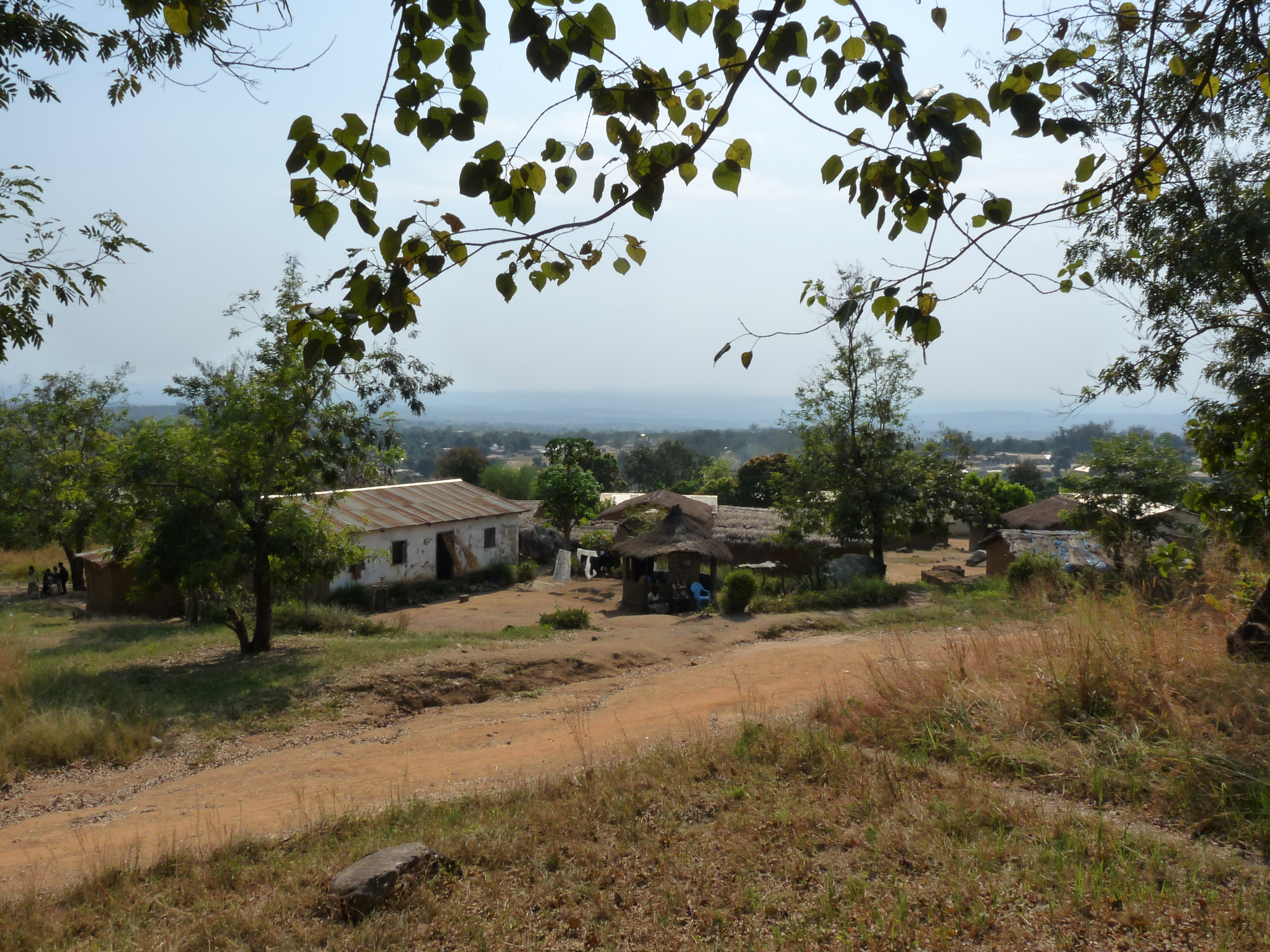
A view of Bouar in 2015.

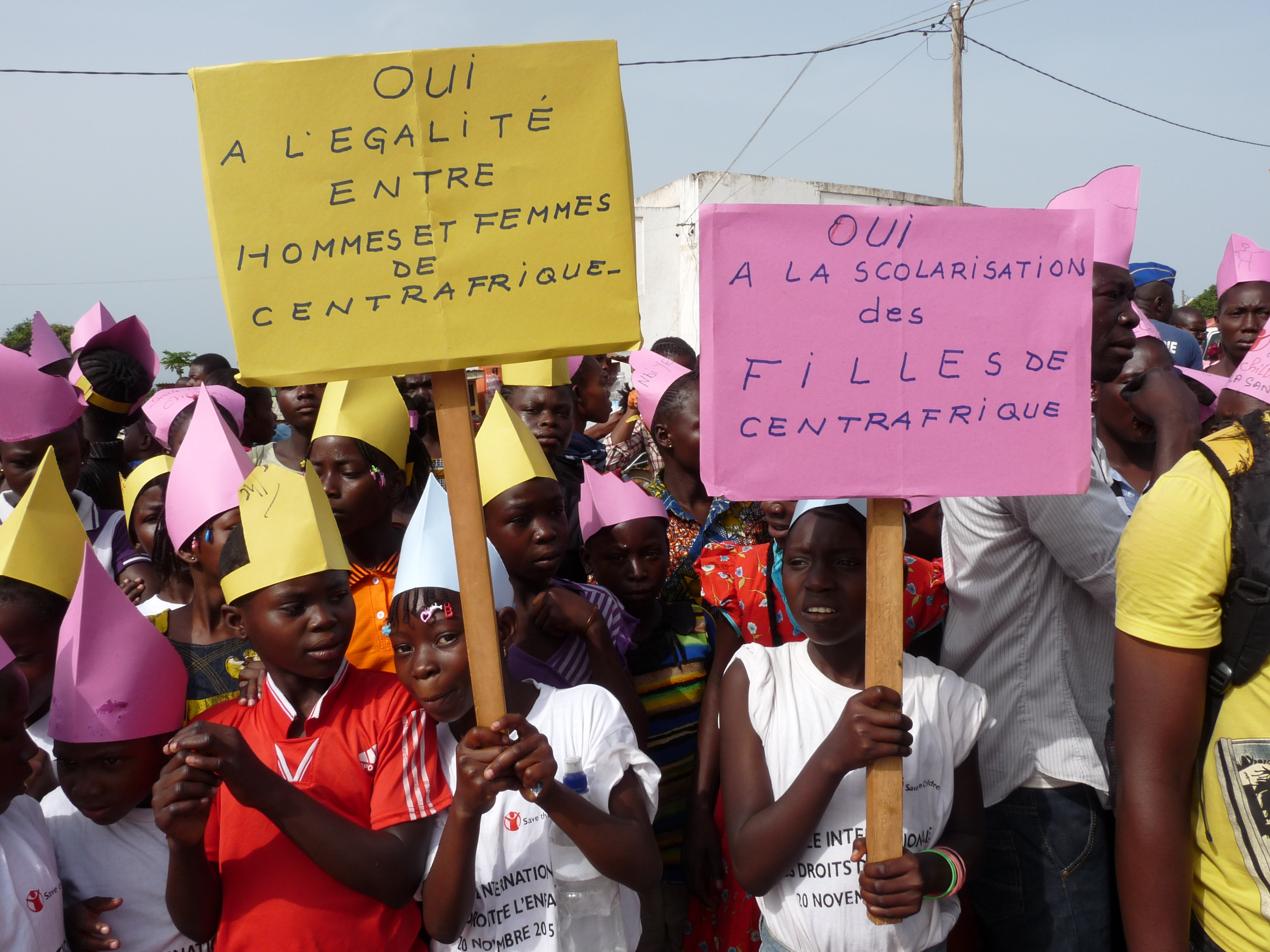
Children celebrating International Women's Day in 2016.

=== Civil war ===
On 28 March 2013 Bouar was captured by Séléka rebels. On 26 October 2013 Bouar was attacked and captured by Anti-balaka militias resulting in more than 20 deaths. As of February 2014 the town and region around Bouar were experiencing ethnic cleansing, principally against Muslim civilians. A French journalist, Camille Lepage, was also killed and her body found in the car of Anti-balaka troops in the Bouar region in May, 2014.

On 18 September 2017 city was recaptured by FACA from Anti-balaka. On 20 December 2020 parts of city were captured by rebels from Coalition of Patriots for Change. On 27 December entire city was captured by rebels. After many clashes it was recaptured by government forces on 8 February 2021.

== Places of worship ==
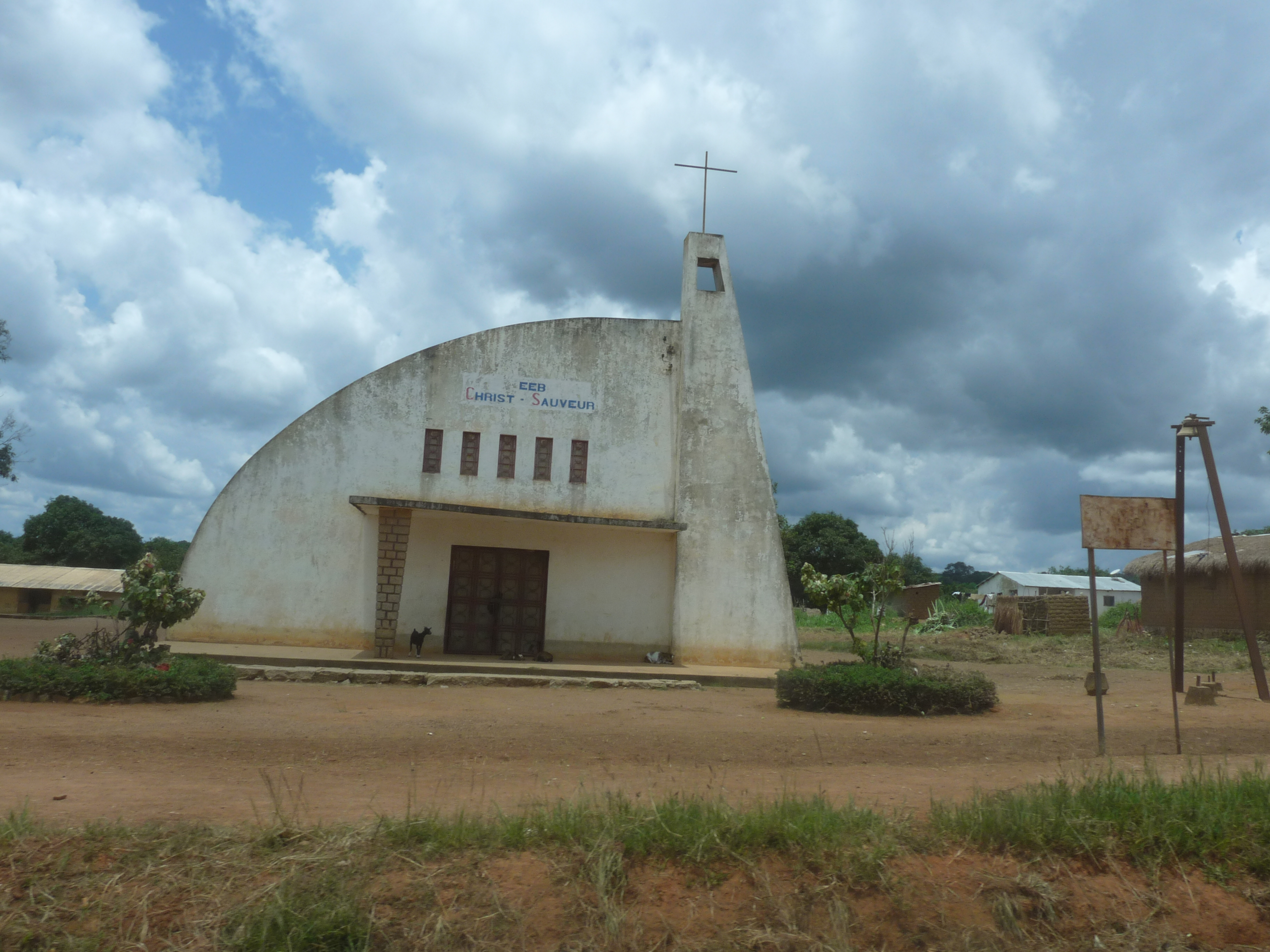
The Evangelical Baptist Church in Bouar.

Among the places of worship, they are predominantly Christian churches and temples : Evangelical Lutheran Church of the Central African Republic (Lutheran World Federation), Evangelical Baptist Church of the Central African Republic (Baptist World Alliance), Roman Catholic Diocese of Bouar (Catholic Church). There are also Muslim mosques.

== Climate ==
Köppen-Geiger climate classification system classifies Bouar’s climate as tropical wet and dry (Aw).

Climate data for Bouar (1991–2020)
Month	Jan	Feb	Mar	Apr	May	Jun	Jul	Aug	Sep	Oct	Nov	Dec	Year
Mean daily maximum °C (°F)	31.4 (88.5)	32.6 (90.7)	31.9 (89.4)	30.1 (86.2)	28.3 (82.9)	27.2 (81.0)	26.2 (79.2)	26.0 (78.8)	27.0 (80.6)	27.8 (82.0)	29.9 (85.8)	30.7 (87.3)	29.1 (84.4)
Daily mean °C (°F)	24.4 (75.9)	26.0 (78.8)	26.3 (79.3)	24.9 (76.8)	23.8 (74.8)	22.8 (73.0)	22.2 (72.0)	22.1 (71.8)	22.4 (72.3)	22.9 (73.2)	24.0 (75.2)	24.5 (76.1)	23.9 (75.0)
Mean daily minimum °C (°F)	17.8 (64.0)	19.4 (66.9)	20.3 (68.5)	19.9 (67.8)	19.3 (66.7)	18.8 (65.8)	18.4 (65.1)	18.4 (65.1)	18.3 (64.9)	18.5 (65.3)	18.5 (65.3)	17.9 (64.2)	18.8 (65.8)
Average precipitation mm (inches)	1.9 (0.07)	13.0 (0.51)	43.5 (1.71)	109.9 (4.33)	144.2 (5.68)	165.2 (6.50)	223.5 (8.80)	277.5 (10.93)	266.4 (10.49)	196.1 (7.72)	18.3 (0.72)	2.1 (0.08)	1,461.7 (57.55)
Average precipitation days (≥ 1.0 mm)	0.1	1.5	4.9	9.2	12.0	13.0	16.4	18.0	18.2	15.0	2.0	0.3	110.7
Average relative humidity (%) (daily average)	34.4	39.6	57.0	71.6	77.8	80.8	82.4	82.9	80.4	77.5	61.7	41.1	65.6
Source: NOAA

== See also ==
- List of cities in the Central African Republic
- Prefectures of the Central African Republic
