= Bozoum =

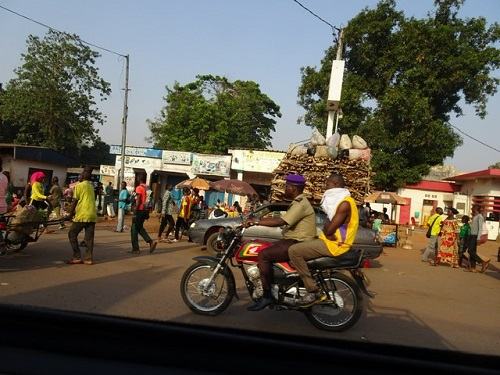

- Location in Central African Republic
- Coordinates: 6°19′02″N 16°22′42″E
- Country: Central African Republic
- Prefecture: Ouham-Pendé
- Sub-prefecture: Bozoum
- Commune: Bozoum

Government
  - Sub-Prefect: Esaïe Gbanne
- Elevation: 660 m (2,170 ft)

Population (2012)
  - Total: 22,284

Bozoum is the capital of Ouham-Pendé, one of the 14 prefectures of the Central African Republic.

== History ==
In the Early 1920s Bozoum was chosen as the site for the Brethren Mission. On a hill right outside of the then Village, the Bassai mission station was established. Bassai is the name of a local mountain. While the mission has long been abandoned, the founder of the Brethren Mission in this part of Africa, James Gribble is buried there along with fellow missionary Lester W. Kennedy Sr.

In 1976, Bozoum received electricity for the first time.

On 13 January 2014 Seleka withdrew from Bozoum. Anti-balaka took control of the town. Muslims who lived there were subjects to threats by militiamen. In March 2017 Anti-balakas disarmed peacekeepers who tried to enter Bozoum.

In March 2019 it was reported that Bozoum was under control of the government with armed forces being deployed there to protect Chinese companies operating in the area.

On 19 November 2020 government forces withdrew from Bozoum and month later on 18 December it was captured by rebels from Coalition of Patriots for Change. It was recaptured by government forces on 25 February 2021.

== Climate ==
Köppen-Geiger climate classification system classifies its climate as tropical wet and dry (Aw).

Climate data for Bozoum
Month	Jan	Feb	Mar	Apr	May	Jun	Jul	Aug	Sep	Oct	Nov	Dec	Year
Mean daily maximum °C (°F)	32.5 (90.5)	33.5 (92.3)	33.1 (91.6)	31.6 (88.9)	30.5 (86.9)	29 (84)	28 (82)	28.2 (82.8)	28.8 (83.8)	29.7 (85.5)	31.8 (89.2)	32.5 (90.5)	30.8 (87.3)
Daily mean °C (°F)	24.3 (75.7)	25.4 (77.7)	26.4 (79.5)	26 (79)	25.3 (77.5)	24.1 (75.4)	23.5 (74.3)	23.9 (75.0)	24 (75)	24.3 (75.7)	24.5 (76.1)	24.2 (75.6)	24.7 (76.4)
Mean daily minimum °C (°F)	16.1 (61.0)	17.4 (63.3)	19.8 (67.6)	20.4 (68.7)	20.1 (68.2)	19.3 (66.7)	19.1 (66.4)	19.6 (67.3)	19.2 (66.6)	18.9 (66.0)	17.2 (63.0)	15.9 (60.6)	18.6 (65.5)
Average precipitation mm (inches)	2 (0.1)	10 (0.4)	36 (1.4)	74 (2.9)	131 (5.2)	158 (6.2)	228 (9.0)	272 (10.7)	235 (9.3)	172 (6.8)	12 (0.5)	1 (0.0)	1,331 (52.5)
Source: Climate-Data.org, altitude: 671m

== See also ==
- List of cities in the Central African Republic
- Prefectures of the Central African Republic
