= Sangha-Mbaéré =

Prefecture of the Central African Republic

Coordinates: 3°30′N 16°05′E

- Prefecture
- Sangha-Mbaere in the Central African Republic

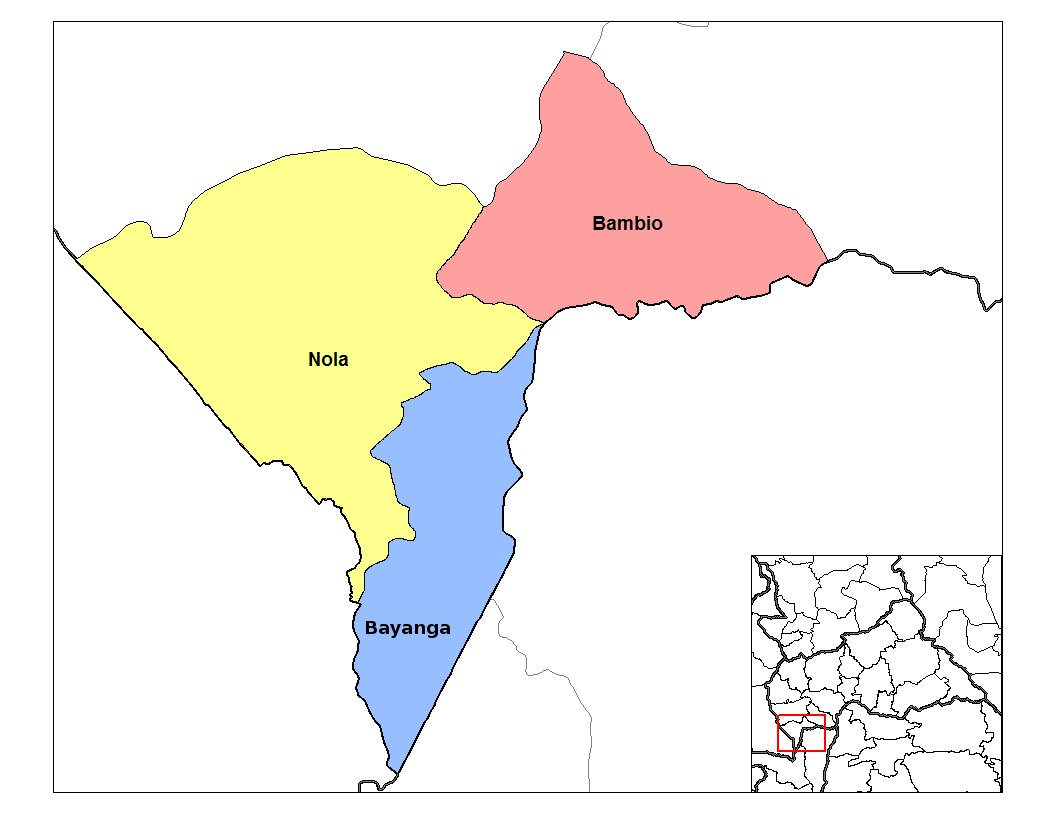
- Sub-prefectures of Sangha-Mbaéré
- Country: Central African Republic
- Capital: Nola

Government
  - Prefect: Louis Marie Kpoka

Area
  - Total: 19,412 km^{2} (7,495 sq mi)

Population (2003 census)
  - Total: 101,074
  - Estimate (2024 estimation): 152,675

Sangha-Mbaéré is one of the 20 prefectures of the Central African Republic. Its capital is Nola. In 2024, official estimates suggest the population reached 152,675 inhabitants.

== Sub-prefectures ==
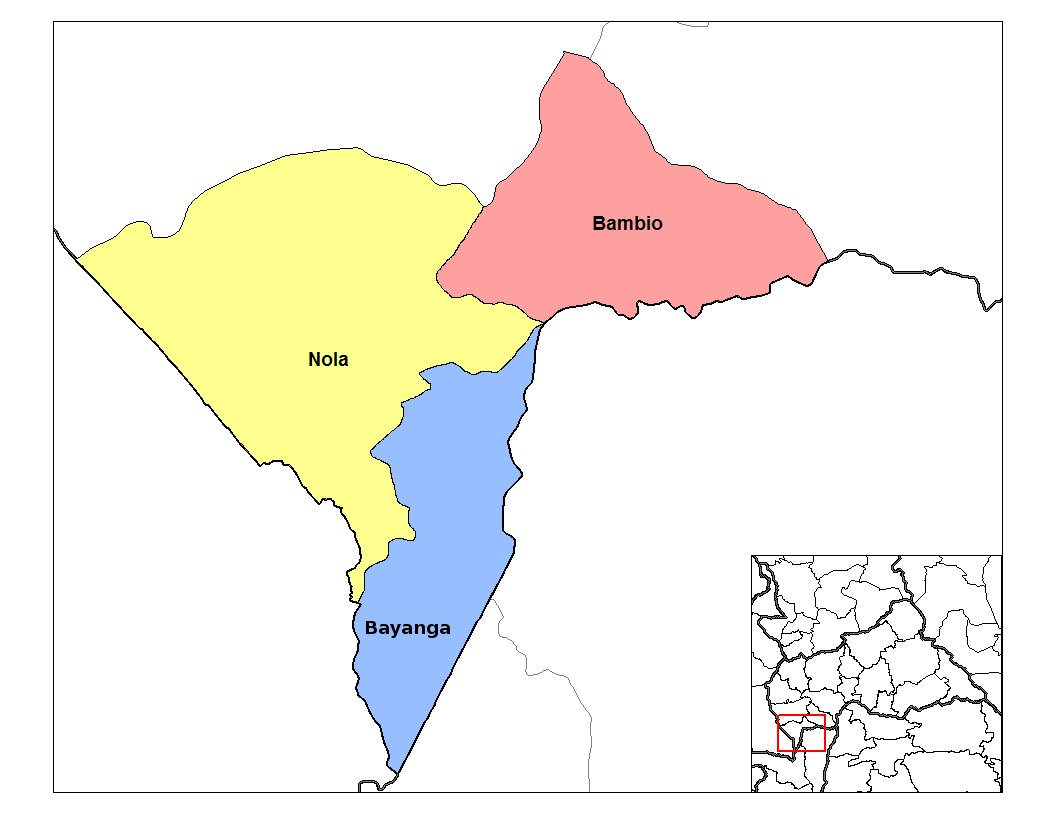
Sub-prefectures of Sangha-Mbaere

- Bambio
- Bayanga
- Nola
