= Carnot, Central African Republic =

Carnot
- Location in Central African Republic
- Coordinates: 4°56′N 15°52′E
- Country: Central African Republic
- Prefecture: Mambéré

Government
  - Sub-Prefect: Clarisse Yakende
- Elevation: 485 m (1,591 ft)

Population (2012)
  - Total: 54,551

Carnot is a city located in the south west of the Central African Republic (CAR), in the prefecture of Mambéré.

It has a population of 54,551 (2012 census), making it the fourth largest city in CAR by population.

The city takes its name as a tribute to the assassinated French President Sadi Carnot.

The city is situated on the eastern bank of the Mambéré river, and is served by Carnot Airport.

Yams, cassava, and cotton are cultivated, and cattle are reared in the area. The region lacks a functioning health service and is affected by an extremely high mortality rate and a high disease burden of malaria, HIV and tuberculosis.

== History ==
In 1894, François Joseph Clozel founded a French military post near the village of Tendira. The locality was given the name Carnot in homage to the French president assassinated in 1894: Sadi Carnot (1837-1894).

In 1902, the town became home to the 5th company of the 1st RTS (Senegalese Rifle Regiment), a corps of colonial infantry in the French army.

On 4 November 1911, as part of the Franco-German Accord, an agreement that ended the Agadir Crisis, Carnot was ceded to the German Cameroon (Kamerun). While claimed by Germany, the region became known as Neukamerun.

During the First World War, the Kamerun campaign (1914), saw the departure of the German occupiers. As a result of this, France then re-claimed the region. By decree on 12 December 1920, Carnot became the capital of a subdivision of the district of Haute-Sangha, then the capital of the district of Mambéré-Lobaye, in French Congo (Colonie du Moyen-Congo). The city was involved in the rubber trade. From the middle of the 1920s onward, cars and roads were introduced to the area. A ferry across the Mambéré was commissioned in 1926. The region was struck by an earthquake in 1934. The following year a Protestant mission was built in Carnot.

French soldiers departed from the city in 1937. In 1938, Berbers and Fulani peoples arrived from North Africa and settled in the area. The first mosque was built in Carnot in 1940, and a bridge over the river Mambéré was constructed in 1944.

The city is the seat of the Roman Catholic parish of Notre-Dame de la Mambéré de Carnot founded in 1945; it depends on the diocese of Berbérati.

The collapse of the mining industry in 2009, and resulting impoverishment of much of the population in Carnot, exacerbated the already poor health situation resulting in high levels of malnutrition and mortality.

=== Civil war ===
On 1 February 2014 Seleka withdrew from Carnot leaving city under Anti-balaka control. Local Muslims were subject to threats and attacks. More than 18 people were killed until 8 February. In July 2017 it was reported to be under control of security forces. On 27 December 2020 rebels from Coalition of Patriots for Change took control of Carnot. They withdrew from the town on 30 December after looting public buildings and burning voting cards.

In December 2020, Carnot became the capital Mambéré Prefecture.

== Notable people ==
- Alexandre Banza
