= Transport in the Central African Republic =

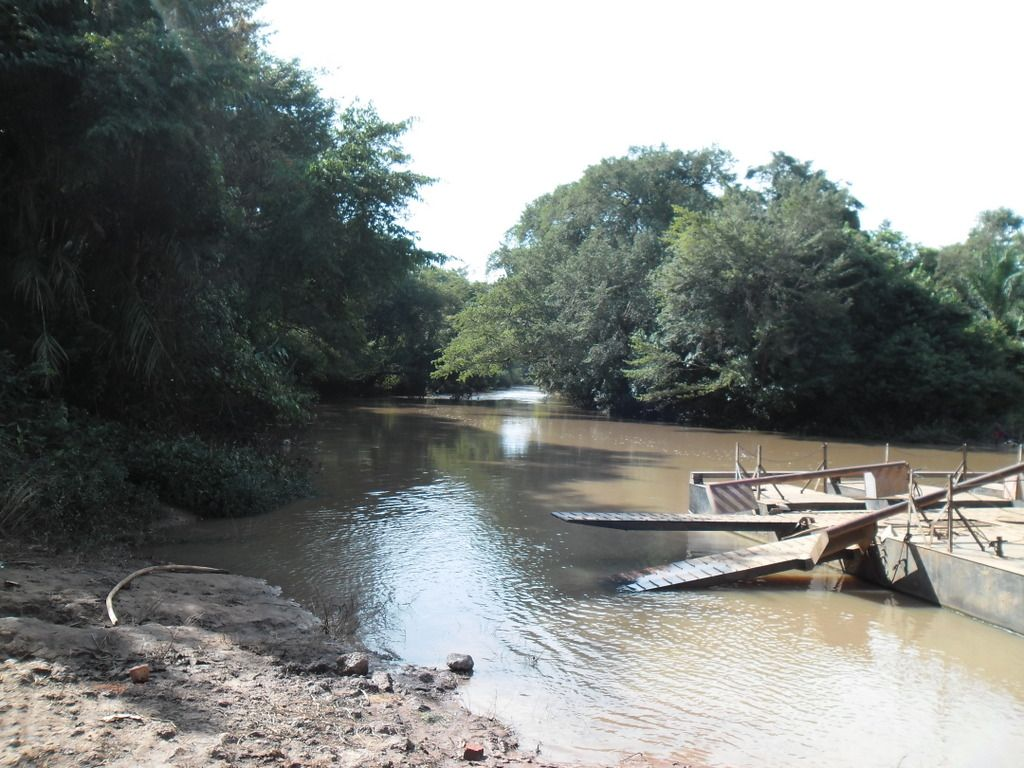
Ferries such as this one near Djemah are sometimes used to transport vehicles across rivers.

Modes of transport in the Central African Republic include road, water, and air. Most of the country is connected to the road network, but not all of it. Some roads in the country do not connect to the rest of the national road network and may become impassable, especially during heavy monsoon rain. Many remote areas that not connected to the country's road network, especially in the eastern part of the country outside of the major cities and towns, can only be reached by light aircraft, boat (via river) or on foot. Most roads are unpaved, and which centres on the routes nationales identified as RN1 to RN11. Bangui serves as a seaport, and 900 km of inland waterways are navigable, the main route being the Oubangui river. There is one international airport at Bangui-Mpoko, two other paved airports, and over 40 with unpaved runways.

== Railways ==
There are presently no railways in the Central African Republic.

A line from Cameroon port of Kribi to Bangui was proposed in 2002.

== Highways ==
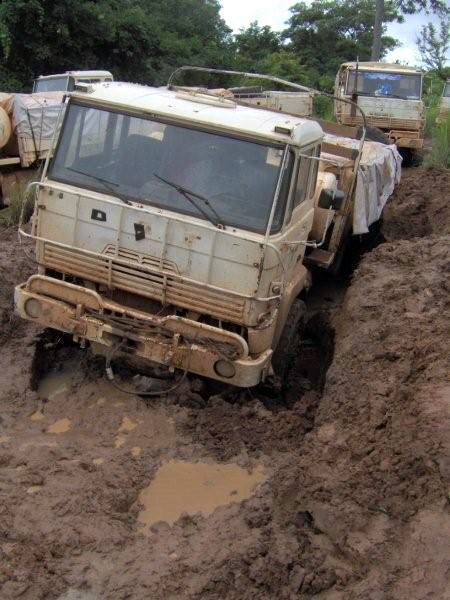
Most highways in the Central African Republic are unpaved and susceptible to damage.

Two trans-African automobile routes pass through the Central African Republic: the Tripoli-Cape Town Highway and the Lagos-Mombasa Highway.

- Total: 23,810 km
- Paved: 643 km
- Unpaved: 23,167 km (1999 est.)

Major roads include:

- RN1 (Route Nationale 1) north from Bangui. 482 km via Bossangoa to Moundou, Chad.
- RN2 east from Bangui. 1202 km via Bambari and Bangassou to the South Sudanese border at Bambouti.
- RN3 west from RN1 at Bossembélé. 453 km via Bouar and Baboua to Boulai on the Cameroon border as part of the east-west Trans-African Highway 8 Lagos-Mombasa.
- RN4 from RN2 at Damara, 76 km north of Bangui, north 554 km via Bouca and Batangafo to Sarh, Chad.
- RN6 south and west from Bangui, 605 km via Mbaïki, Carnot and Berbérati to Gamboula on the border with Cameroon.
- RN8 north-east from RN2 at Sibut, 023 km via Kaga Bandoro, Ndéle, and Birao to the Sudanese border.
- RN10 south from RN6 at Berbérati, 136 km via Bania to Nola.
- RN11 from Baoro on RN3 south, 104 km to Carnot on RN6.

The roads east to Sudan and north to Chad are poorly maintained.

== Waterways ==
900 km; traditional trade carried on by means of shallow-draft dugouts; Oubangui is the most important river, navigable all year to craft drawing 0.6 m or less; 282 km navigable to craft drawing as much as 1.8 m.

=== Ports and Harbors ===
There is only one river port, located at the capital, Bangui. It serves as the country's sole modern fluvial gateway, connecting the Central African Republic to the Atlantic via the Oubangui–Congo river system, which flows downstream to Brazzaville and Kinshasa, and onward by rail from Pointe-Noire to ocean-going vessels.

=== Regulations and Transit Requirements ===
Because the Central African Republic is landlocked, all maritime imports and exports must transit through a neighboring coastal country, most commonly Cameroon; via the ports of Douala or Kribi, and to a lesser extent through the Congo-river corridor via Pointe-Noire. The BESC/ECTN remains strictly compulsory for all shipments destined for Bangui. The Electronic Cargo Tracking Note (ECTN), also known locally as the Bordereau Électronique de Suivi des Cargaisons (BESC) or BSC, was established by Bangui customs authorities in 2000 and must be validated no later than five days before the vessel's arrival at the port of discharge.

The certificate is issued against the bill of lading, commercial invoice, and freight invoice, and is the shipper's responsibility to obtain; missing or inaccurate ECTNs trigger heavy fines and customs delays at the transit port.

for cargo transiting through Douala or Kribi, only one BESC is required, specifically issued for the Central African Republic.

== Airports ==
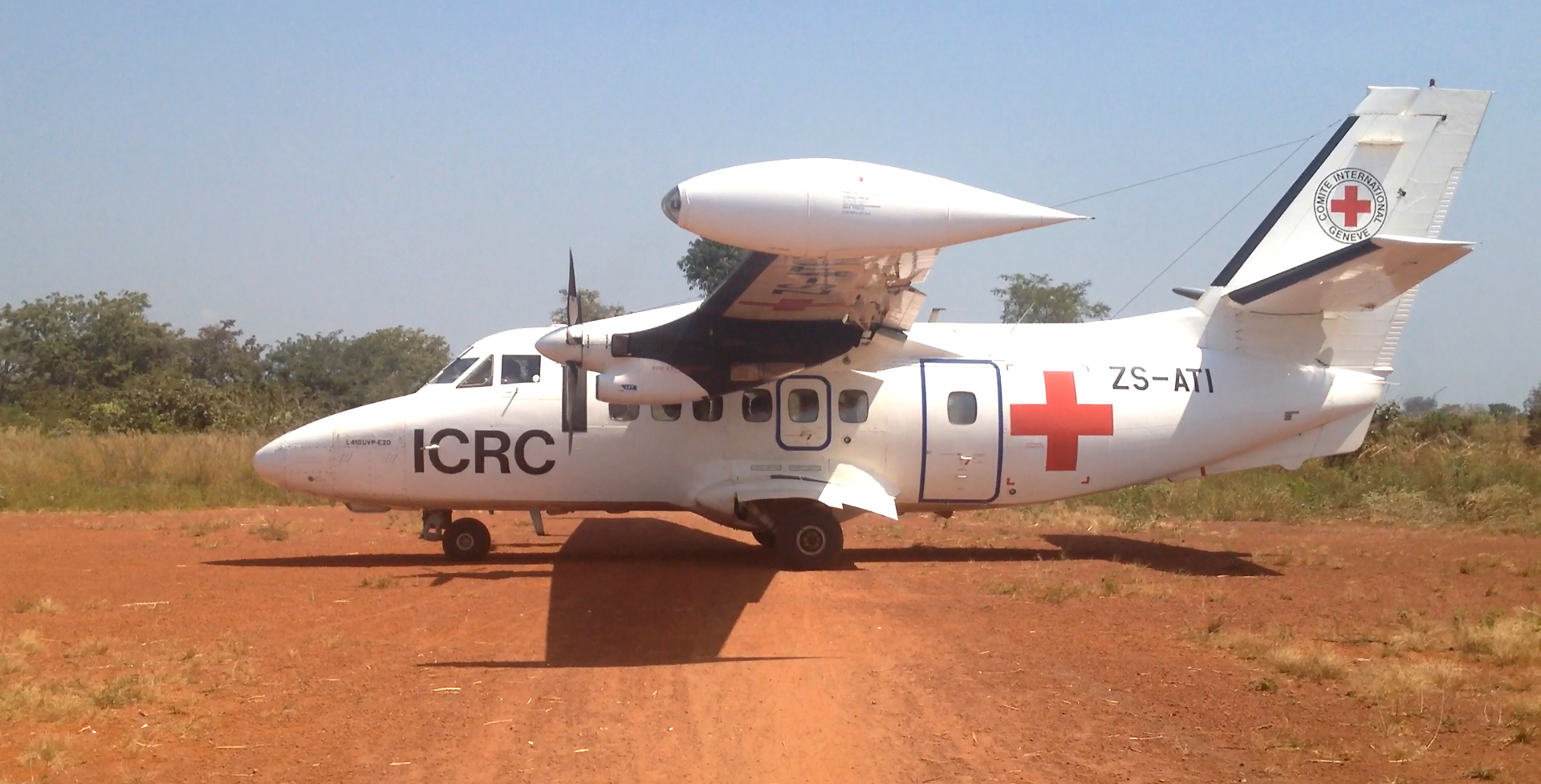
The majority of airfields in the Central African Republic have unpaved runways and are only used by chartered flights such as this one from the Red Cross.

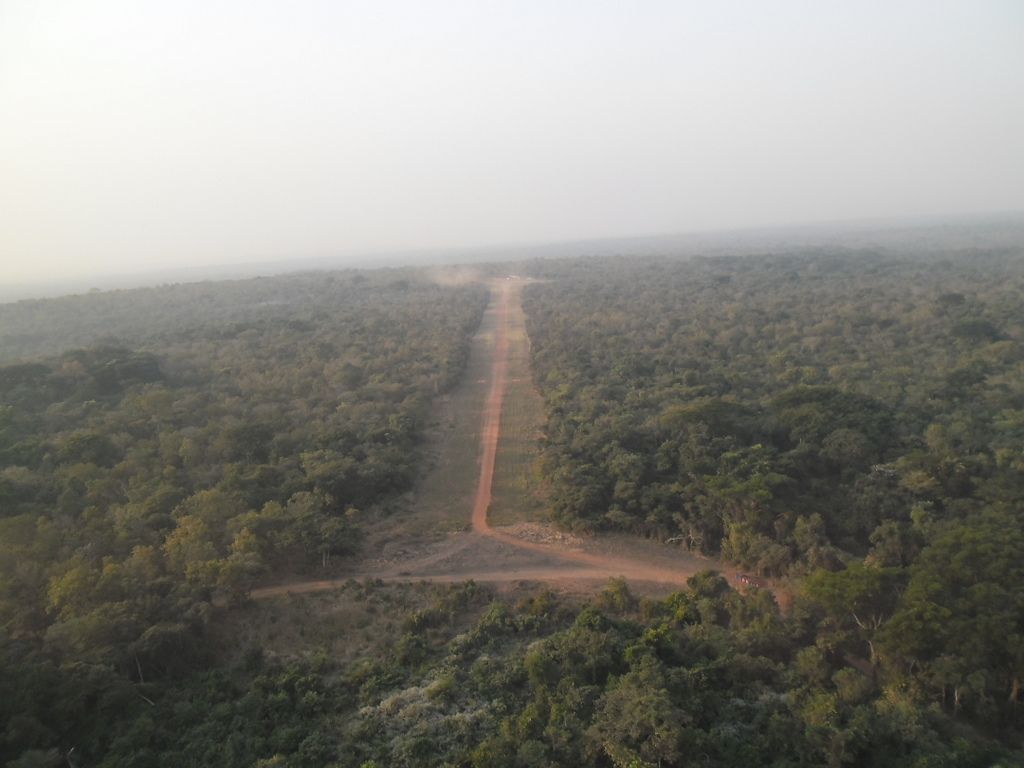
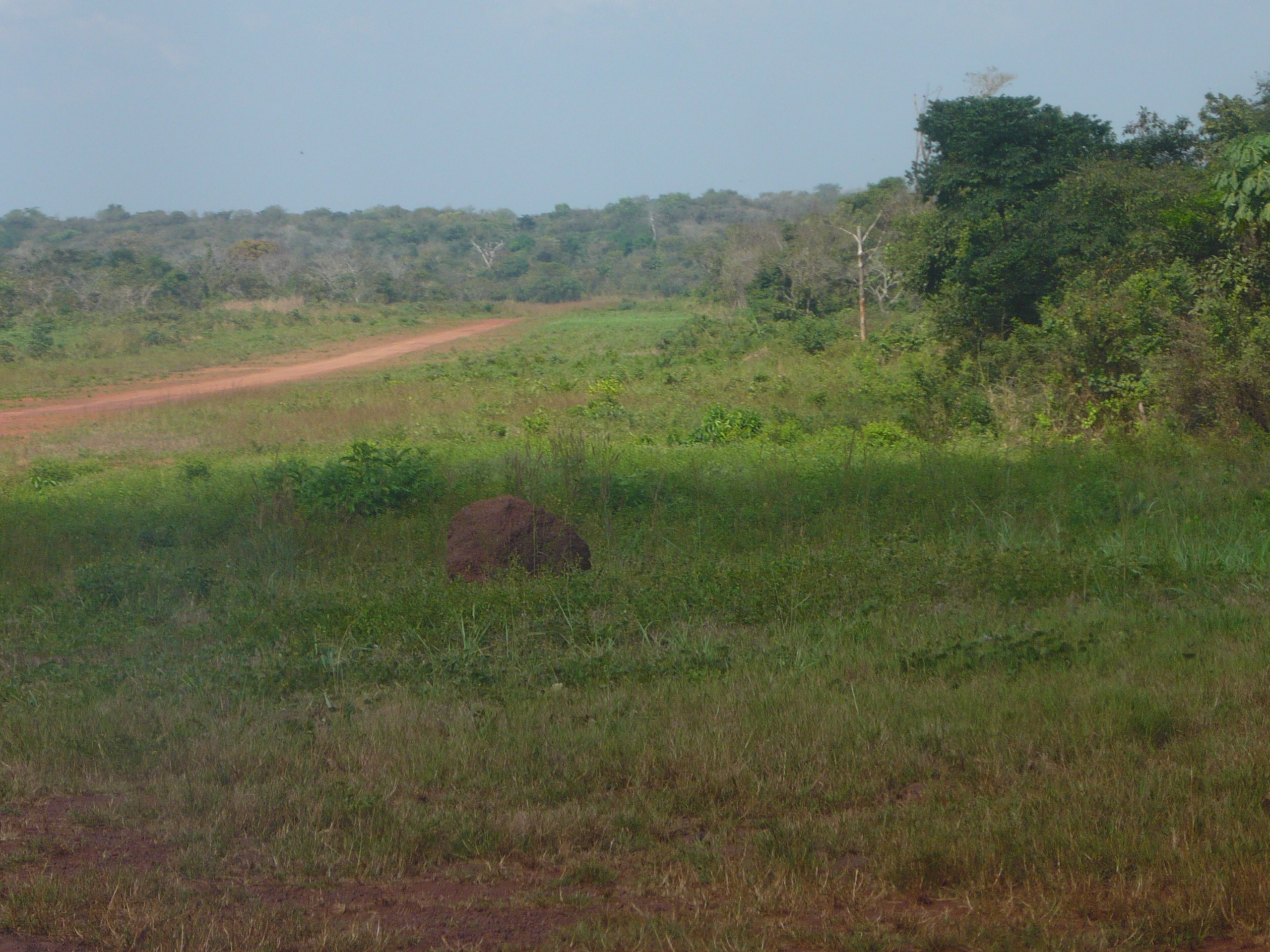
Dirt runways in Djemah and Obo, respectively.

=== Airports with paved runways ===
- Total: 3
- 2,438 to 3,047 m: 1
- 1,524 to 2,437 m: 2 (2002)

The most important airport in the Central African Republic is Bangui M'Poko International Airport (ICAO: FEFF)

=== Airports with unpaved runways ===
- Total: 47
- 2,438 to 3,047 m: 1
- 1,524 to 2,437 m: 10
- 914 to 1,523 m: 23
- Under 914 m: 13 (2002)

== See also ==
- Central African Republic
