= 2018 Batangafo clashes =

- Part of the Central African Republic Civil War
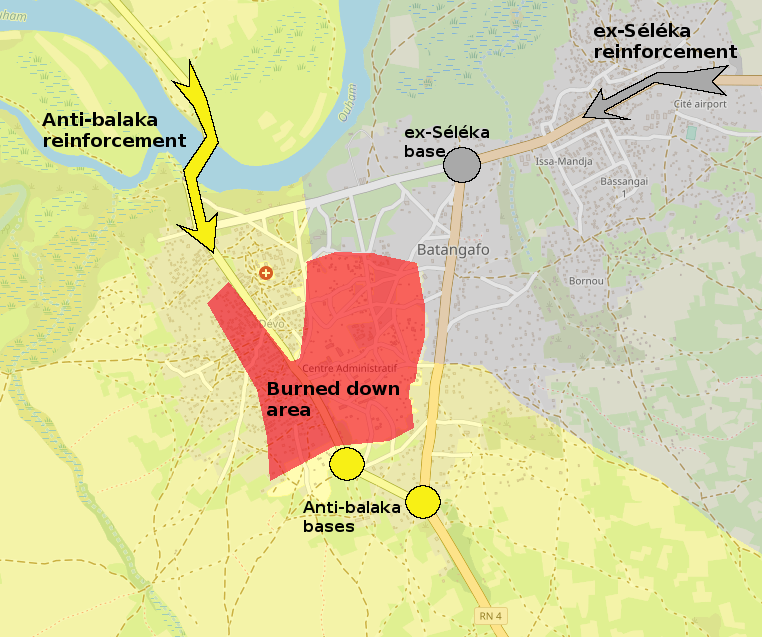
Date	31 October – 17 November 2018
Location	Batangafo, Central African Republic
Result	Stalemate

Belligerents
ex-Séléka: FPRC; MPC	Anti-balaka	(United Nations) MINUSCA: Cameroon; Pakistan

Strength
120 (initial)	50 (initial)	31 October: (Pakistan) 100; 1 November: (Pakistan) 128; 7 November: (Pakistan) (Cameroon) 138

Casualties and losses
0–2 killed, 12 injured	2–4 killed, 3 injured	None
- At least 9 civilians killed, 14 injured and 20,809 displaced

In 2018 a series of clashes occurred in the Central African Republic town of Batangafo between Anti-balaka and Ex-Séléka militias.

== Timeline of events ==
- 31 October: Anti-balaka fighters stabbed motorcyclist from Kabo who delivered vaccines to hospital. In retaliation Ex-Séléka fighters attacked IDP camps burning shelters.
- 1 November: Ex-Séléka attacked and looted places in Batangafo. MINUSCA reinforcement arrived.
- 2 November: Reinforcement from Kabo and Kaga-Bandoro for Ex-Séléka and from Ouogo/Kambakota for Anti-balaka arrived.
- 4 November: Young people demonstrated against MINUSCA.
- 5 November: Continuous fight between Ex-Séléka and Anti-balaka.
- 6 November: Demonstration against Pakistani troops. Another MINUSCA reinforcement arrived.
- 7 November: Fightings largely stop. Another MINUSCA reinforcement arrived.
- 8 November: Anti-balaka barriers disappeared. 5,100 tents have been destroyed.
- 11 November: Anti-balaka blocked access to hospital for people from Lakouanga.
- 12 November: MINUSCA dispersed Anti-balaka.
- 13 November: Women and children protested against MINUSCA inaction.
- 15 November: FPRC threatened to burn down the hospital.
- 17 November: Meeting between MINUSCA and Ex-Séléka on ultimatum.

== Fatalities ==
15 people were killed and 29 were injured as a result of the clashes. 20,809 people were displaced, 5,141 huts (93 percent of the total) and 200 houses were burnt.
