= Bongonon =

- Location in Central African Republic
- Coordinates: 7°16′14″N 18°34′53″E
- Country: Central African Republic
- Prefecture: Ouham-Fafa
- Sub-prefecture: Kabo
- Commune: Ouaki

Bongonon is a village located in Ouham-Fafa Prefecture, Central African Republic.

== History ==
An alleged Mbororo herder militia attacked Bongonon on 8 May 2012, killing two people. Bongonon residents fled to Farazala or settlements in the south of their village due to the clashes in Ouandago–Batangafo axis in July 2014. A fire incident broke out in the village's IDP camps that hosted refugees from Bouca and its surrounding area on 12 February 2021.

== Education ==
There is a school in Bongonon.

== Healthcare ==
Bongonon has one health post. In 2023, MSF Spain provided support to the health post operational.
