= Kpokpo, Nana-Grébizi =

Kpokpo
- Location in Central African Republic
- Coordinates: 7°1′17″N 19°9′16″E
- Country: Central African Republic
- Prefecture: Nana-Grebizi
- Sub-prefecture: Kaga Bandoro
- Commune: Botto

Kpokpo is a village situated 6 km from Kaga-Bandoro in Nana-Grebizi Prefecture, Central African Republic.

== History ==
On 11 December 2006, FACA and Presidential Guard forces entered Kpokpo, killing four people and burning 44 houses.

Around 2016 to 2017, MPC and FPRC rebels controlled the village and erected a roadblock. Serving as the first of the nine roadblocks along the Kaga-Bandoro-Sido road, the Kpokpo roadblock was a strategic and profitable site where the rebels earned 800,000 FCFA per week. In July 2017, some villagers sought refuge at the Lazare site due to fear of retaliation by armed groups.

== Education ==
There is a school in Kpokpo.

== Healthcare ==
The village has one health post.

== Bibliography ==
- HRW, HRW (18 April 2008). State of Anarchy: Rebellion and Abuses against Civilians (PDF) (Report). Human Rights Watch.
