= Maorka =

- Location in Central African Republic
- Coordinates: 6°39′36″N 19°40′48″E
- Country: Central African Republic
- Prefecture: Nana-Grebizi
- Sub-prefecture: Mbrès
- Commune: Mbrès

Government
  - Village chief: Alphonse Mapouka

Population (2020)
  - Total: 555

Maorka is a village situated in Nana-Grebizi Prefecture, Central African Republic.

== History ==
In mid-April 2013, Séléka stormed Maorka, pillaging the civilian properties and burning 38 houses. This attack caused 113 families to seek refuge in the bush. FPRC militias from Mbrès attacked Maorka on 2 April 2015, killing six civilians, looting civilian belongings, and prompting the residents to flee to the bush.

MPC militias invaded the village on 20 August 2015 because of an alleged Anti-balaka attack on a Fulani camp that killed six civilians. During the attack, two people were killed. On 22 August 2015, armed militia reattacked Maorka, forcing the displacement of the villagers. Several days after the attack, the attackers encouraged the residents to return to Maorka. However, the village was reinvaded again on 1 September 2015, leading the villagers to flee to the bush. Maorka's residents left their village for bush on 11 May 2016 due to the attack on the neighboring village of Ndiba.

== Education ==
There is a school in Maorka.

== Healthcare ==
The village has one health post. An armed group looted the health post in July 2018.
