= Mahamat Al-Khatim =

Leader of Central African Patriotic Movement

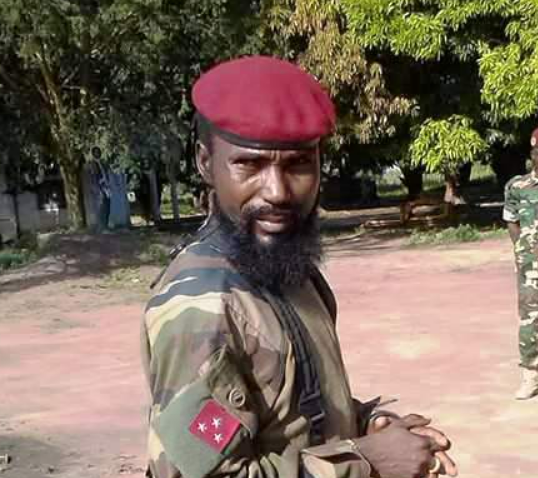
- Born: Chad
- Military career
- Allegiance: Central African Patriotic Movement
- Service years: 2014–present

Mahamat Al-Khatim is a Central African military leader who leads the Central African Patriotic Movement armed group in the Central African Republic.

== Biography ==
Mahamat Al-Khatim is a Baggara Arab belonging to the Salamat ethnic group. At some point, he rebelled against the Chadian government, but was reintegrated into the Chad National Army in 1997. He was among the so-called "liberators", fighters who had supported Bozizé's coup d’état in 2003. In 2013 he joined the Séléka coalition.

In July 2015 he created the Central African Patriotic Movement armed group which controlled areas in northern parts of the Central African Republic, including Moyenne-Sido, Kabo and Kaga-Bandoro. In December 2020, al-Khatim and the MPC joined the Coalition of Patriots for Change led by François Bozizé. He ordered his fighters to attack Bangui in January 2021. Due to the failure of this coup attempt, al-Khatim was forced to flee the Central African Republic and, as of June 2021, he resides in the capital of Chad, N'Djamena.

Togerther with Abakar Sabone, ANS detained Al-Khatim on 10 April 2024 for exposing the Chadian government embezzlement of Angolan fund for the Central African warlord who settled in Chad. Chadian authorities released him on the first week of March 2025.
