= Kambakota =

- Location in Central African Republic
- Coordinates: 7°9′23″N 17°52′21″E
- Country: Central African Republic
- Prefecture: Ouham-Fafa
- Sub-prefecture: Batangafo
- Commune: Bédé

Population (2008)
  - Total: 1,300

Kambakota or Kamakota is a village located in the Central African Republic prefecture of Ouham-Fafa.

== History ==
In 1985 UNICEF built three wells in Kambota, two of which had broken down as of 2008. In March 2008 around 1,400 displaced people arrived there from other villages.

On 1 December 2016 it was reported that Kambakota was under control of MPC. As of October 2018 Kambakota was under control of Anti-balaka. In October 2020 heavy clashes erupted between Anti-balaka factions in Kambakota. On 26 February 2021 Kambakota was captured by government forces supported by Rwandan military. On 4 January 2022 armed forces clashes with CPC rebels killing four of them.
