= Bozakon =

- Location in Central African Republic
- Coordinates: 6°56′58″N 18°30′19″E
- Country: Central African Republic
- Prefecture: Ouham-Fafa
- Sub-prefecture: Bouca
- Commune: Lady-Gbawi

Population (2014)
  - Total: 375

Bozakon is a village situated in Ouham-Fafa Prefecture, Central African Republic.

== History ==
Peuhl herders militia attacked Bozakon in January 2015, burning houses and food storage facilities and causing the villagers to flee to Mbada. The FPRC invaded the village in May 2015 and killed one person. A clash between two armed groups in Bouca-Bozakon prompted residents to seek refuge in Kozoro 1 and Kozoro 2 in May 2018.

== Religion ==
There is a Baptist church in the village.

== Bibliography ==
- ACF; UNICEF (November 2019). République Centrafricaine: RRM : Rapport d’Intervention Wash, Localités : Bozakon, Commune : Lady Gbawi, Sous-préfecture : Bouca, Préfecture : Ouham (Période d’Intervention du 19 au 28 août 2019) (PDF) (Report).
