= Ramadane =

- Location in Central African Republic
- Coordinates: 7°3′36″N 19°56′31″E
- Country: Central African Republic
- Prefecture: Nana-Grebizi
- Sub-prefecture: Mbrès
- Commune: Mbrès

Government
  - Village chief: Nicaise Walamba

Population (2020)
  - Total: 696

Ramadane is a village situated in Nana-Grebizi Prefecture, Central African Republic.

== History ==
In March 2022, all Ramadane's residents fled to the nearby villages due to the insecurity and the presence of CPC rebels.

== Education ==
There is a school in the village.

== Healthcare ==
Ramadane has one health post.
