= Gbadéné =

- Location in Central African Republic
- Coordinates: 7°8′31″N 18°20′24″E
- Country: Central African Republic
- Prefecture: Ouham-Fafa
- Sub-prefecture: Batangafo
- Commune: Ouassi

Gbadéné, often written Gbadene, is a village situated 24 km from Batangafo in Ouham-Fafa Prefecture, Central African Republic.

== History ==
An armed group stormed Gbadéné on 14 April 2013 and burned over 100 homes. Human Rights Watch blamed the Séléka while RJDH attributed the Fulani herder militias for the attack. An armed group attacked Gbadéné on 8 January 2019, leading to the displacement of the villagers to Lamy and other settlements within the Lady–Bouca axis.

== Education ==
Gbadéné has one school.

== Healthcare ==
The village has one health post. The armed militia looted the health post during the January 2019 attack.
