= Lakouetene =

- Location in Central African Republic
- Coordinates: 6°36′29″N 19°49′15″E
- Country: Central African Republic
- Prefecture: Nana-Grebizi
- Sub-prefecture: Mbrès
- Commune: Mbrès

Lakouetene, also written Lakouéténé, is a village situated in Nana-Grebizi Prefecture, Central African Republic.

== History ==
In August 2014, ex-Seleka militias attacked Lakouetene and killed five people. UPC rebels led by Ousman Abakae alias Chauffeur stormed Lakouetene and burned the civilian houses to avenge the looting of an UPC-escorted truck in Sueur on 12 August. Due to the attack, the residents fled to the forest. Anti-balaka attacked MINUSCA patrol in the village on 20 July 2018, and later they withdrew from the scene.

== Education ==
Lakouetene has one school.

== Healthcare ==
There is a health post in the village.
