= Marali =

- Location in Central African Republic
- Coordinates: 6°2′21″N 18°24′16″E
- Country: Central African Republic
- Prefecture: Ouham-Fafa
- Sub-prefecture: Bouca
- Commune: Fafa-Boungou

Marali is a village situated in Ouham-Fafa Prefecture, Central African Republic.

== History ==
In the 1940s, Marali became the capital of Canton of Koumi.

An armed group from Bogangolo attacked Marali on 18 October 2015 as an act of retaliation, after one of its members was killed by a person from Marali. During the attack, they burned the village, killed four people, and looted 123 houses. Responding to the attack, the villagers sought refuge either to bush or nearby villages such as Bofidoua, Kolinga, and Donzi.

== Education ==
There is a school in the village.

== Healthcare ==
Marali has one health center.
