= Bamatara =

- Location in Central African Republic
- Coordinates: 6°56′5″N 18°59′23″E
- Country: Central African Republic
- Prefecture: Nana-Grebizi
- Sub-prefecture: Kaga Bandoro
- Commune: Botto

Bamatara is a village situated in Nana-Grebizi Prefecture, Central African Republic.

== History ==
In April 2017, Bamatara and the other villages along the Botto axis were attacked, burned, and looted by an unknown armed group. The attacks caused the residents in those villages to flee to Kaga Bandoro. Bamatara residents began returning only in June and July 2017. An armed group attacked Bamatara on 17-18 October 2017, killing two people and stealing motorcycles and money. Due to the attack, Bamatara, Fah, and Fah Pilote residents sought refuge in the bush or Botokon. They gradually returned on 25 October 2017.

An armed herder group attacked and looted the village on 16 January 2019. They also destroyed the school and health post. The villagers fled to the bush and returned one day after the attack. However, an armed militia entered the village again and caused the residents to seek refuge in the bush or villages along the Bamatara–Kaga-Bandoro and Marzé axes. They only returned to Bamatara on 23 January.

An armed group invaded Bamatara and looted the health post on 24 August 2020, prompting the residents to flee to the bush, MINUSCA's IDP camp in Kaga Bandoro, and settlements in the Kaga Bandoro–Bangui axis. Previously, there was a tension between the villagers and the Fulani armed herders in early 2020. The latter destroyed Bamatara farming fields.

== Education ==
Bamatara has one school.

== Healthcare ==
There is a health post in the village.
