= Morobanda =

- Location in Central African Republic
- Coordinates: 6°31′36″N 19°50′2″E
- Country: Central African Republic
- Prefecture: Nana-Grebizi
- Sub-prefecture: Mbrès
- Commune: Mbrès

Morobanda is a village situated in Nana-Grebizi Prefecture, Central African Republic.

== History ==
A clash between Ex-Séléka and Anti-balaka ensued in Morobanda on 19 October 2014 and it resulted in the death of two people. LRA raided Morobanda between December 2014 and February 2015, kidnapping 14 children.

A June 2018 attack on two trucks heading to Mbrès and a threat from an armed group caused Morobanda's residents to flee to bush or Mbrès. In November 2018, an armed group occupied the village, causing the displacement of the villagers. On 30 March 2021, CPC rebels visited Morobanda and abducted two youths. Their presence led to the displacement of the villagers.

== Economy ==
There is a mine near the village.

== Education ==
Morobanda has one school.

== Healthcare ==
The village has one health post.
