= Grevaï =

- Location in Central African Republic
- Coordinates: 7°3′13″N 19°26′26″E
- Country: Central African Republic
- Prefecture: Nana-Grebizi
- Sub-prefecture: Kaga Bandoro
- Commune: Grivaï-Pamia

Population (2021)
  - Total: 5,300

Grevaï, also spelled Ngrévaï, is a village located in Nana-Grebizi Prefecture, Central African Republic.

== History ==
An armed herder captured Grevaï on 5 April 2014. They killed the villagers, looted the civilian's properties, and raped women.

CPC attacked Grevaï on 17 May 2021. They torched down houses and pillaged villagers' properties. The militias killed ten people and injured several others. As a result, the villagers fled to Kaga-Bandoro. Previously, over 2000 people fled to Kaga Bandoro due to the presence of CPC in Grevaï.

== Economy ==
The villagers rely on the hunting and farming sector for their livelihood. A market can also be found located in the village's square.

== Education ==
There is one school in Grevaï.

== Healthcare ==
The village has one health center. The health center has maternity ward.
