= Dissikou =

- Location in Central African Republic
- Coordinates: 6°27′42″N 19°8′39″E
- Country: Central African Republic
- Prefecture: Nana-Grebizi
- Sub-prefecture: Kaga Bandoro
- Commune: Ndenga

Dissikou is a village situated in Nana-Grebizi Prefecture, Central African Republic.

== History ==
An alleged Anti-balaka threw a grenade at a convoy of Muslims in Dissikou on 29 April 2014, killing two and injuring six people. Ex-Seleka and Fulani militia attacked Dissikou on 10 May 2014 and burned 13 civilians to death in their homes. Due to the attacks, the villagers fled to Kaga Bandoro. Anti-balaka ambushed cattle truck heading to Bangui on 20 September and killed five Muslims after hiding.

An Armed group stormed a convoy of livestock trucks escorted by MINUSCA on 29 October 2016, injuring two soldiers and two militias. Nevertheless, the trucks managed to reach Sibut.

== Education ==
There is a school in the village.

== Healthcare ==
Dissikou has one health center. In 2021, the health center was rehabilitated.
