= Gbazara =

- Location in Central African Republic
- Coordinates: 7°27′13″N 18°26′24″E
- Country: Central African Republic
- Prefecture: Ouham-Fafa
- Sub-prefecture: Batangafo
- Commune: Ouassi

Government
  - Village chief: Mathurin Kouenam

Gbazara is a village situated in Ouham-Fafa Prefecture, Central African Republic.

== History ==
An armed militia from Chad attacked Gbazara on 14 April 2022, looting civilian properties and injuring two women. As of October 2023, the village is under the control of the government forces.

== Education ==
Gbazara has one school.

== Economy ==
There is a market in Gbazara.

== Healthcare ==
Gbazara has one health post. In January 2020, the health post did not operate.
