= Mbali =

Mbali is a feminine given name meaning "flower."

- Mbali, Ouham-Fafa, a village in Ouham-Fafa Prefecture, Central African Republic
- Mbali language, a minor Bantu language of Angola
- Mbali Dhlamini, South African artist
- Mbali Ntuli (born c. 1988), South African politician
- Mbali Sigidi, a South African sports broadcaster
