= Albert Vanbuel =

Catholic bishop of Kaga-Bandoro, CAR

Albert Vanbuel S.D.B.
- Bishop Emeritus of Kaga-Bandoro
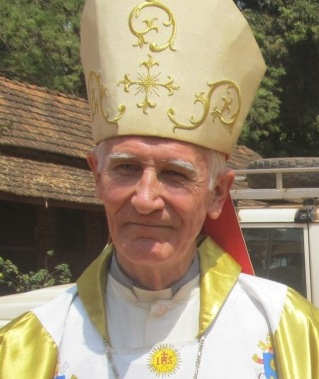
- Church: Catholic Church
- Diocese: Diocese of Kaga-Bandoro
- In office: 16 July 2005 – 27 September 2015
- Predecessor: Xavier Yombandje
- Successor: Tadeusz Kusy

Orders
- Ordination: 21 September 1967
- Consecration: 28 September 2005 by Xavier Yombandje

Personal details
- Born: 5 December 1940 (age 85) Zolder, Military Administration in Belgium and Northern France, Nazi Germany
- Education: Catholic University of Louvain

Albert Vanbuel (born 5 December 1940) is a Belgian Salesian missionary and former bishop of Kaga-Bandoro in the Central African Republic. He was educated at the Don Bosco College in Hechtel and entered the Salesian novitiate in 1958. He made his perpetual vows in 1965, and was ordained priest in 1967. He studied Religious and Moral Sciences at the Catholic University of Louvain, graduating in 1969, and followed this with a degree in Theology in 1971.

After holding several appointments in his order in Belgium, and working some time as a parish priest and youth worker, he became a missionary in Central Africa in 1994. On 16 July 2005, Pope Benedict XVI appointed him bishop of Kaga-Bandoro.

On 9 June 2011, as president of the Episcopal Commission for Justice and Peace, he sent an appeal to the international community "to provide the necessary logistical and material support to the fight against the growing insecurity in the country".

Vanbuel offered his resignation in 2015 and Pope Francis accepted it on 27 September 2015. He was succeeded by Tadeusz Kusy OFM.
