= Tadeusz Kusy =

Polish Roman Catholic prelate (1951–2024)

Most Reverend Tadeusz Zbigniew Kusy, OFM
- Bishop of Kaga-Bandoro
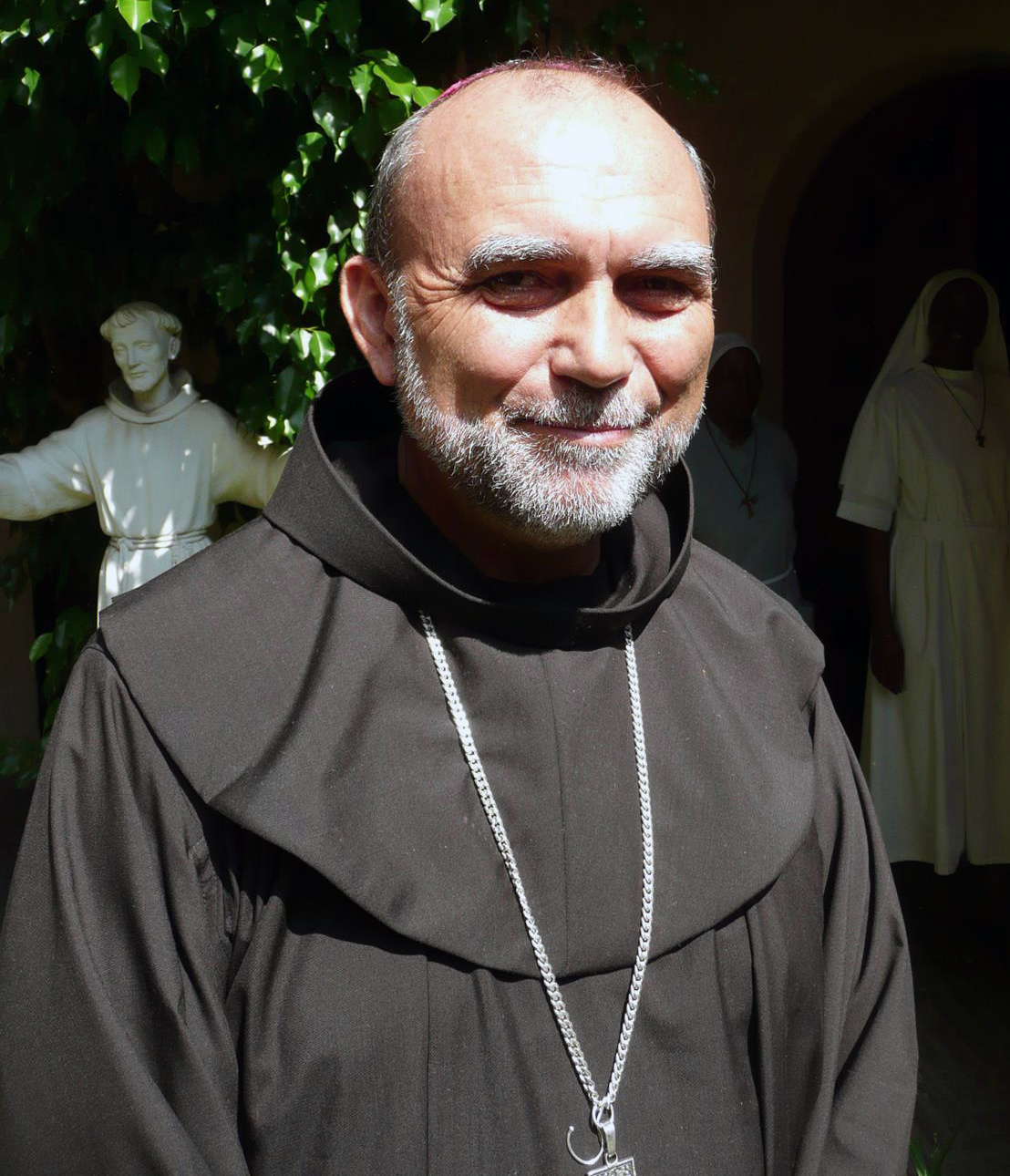
- Church: Roman Catholic Church
- Metropolis: Roman Catholic Archdiocese of Bangui
- Diocese: Roman Catholic Diocese of Kaga-Bandoro
- Installed: 27 September 2015
- Term ended: 31 March 2024
- Predecessor: Albert Vanbuel, S.D.B.
- Successor: Vacant
- Previous post: Bishop coadjutor of Kaga-Bandoro (2014–2015)

Orders
- Ordination: 15 April 1976 by Herbert Bednorz
- Consecration: 15 August 2014 by Dieudonné Nzapalainga C.S.Sp.

Personal details
- Born: Tadeusz Kusy; 2 December 1951 Cieszyn, Poland
- Died: 31 March 2024 (aged 72) Kaga-Bandoro, Central African Republic
- Denomination: Roman Catholic
- Education: St. Bonaventure’s Franciscan Theological Seminary in Katowice
- Motto: Z Tobą i dla Ciebe, Jezu! (Polish): With you and for you, Jesus!
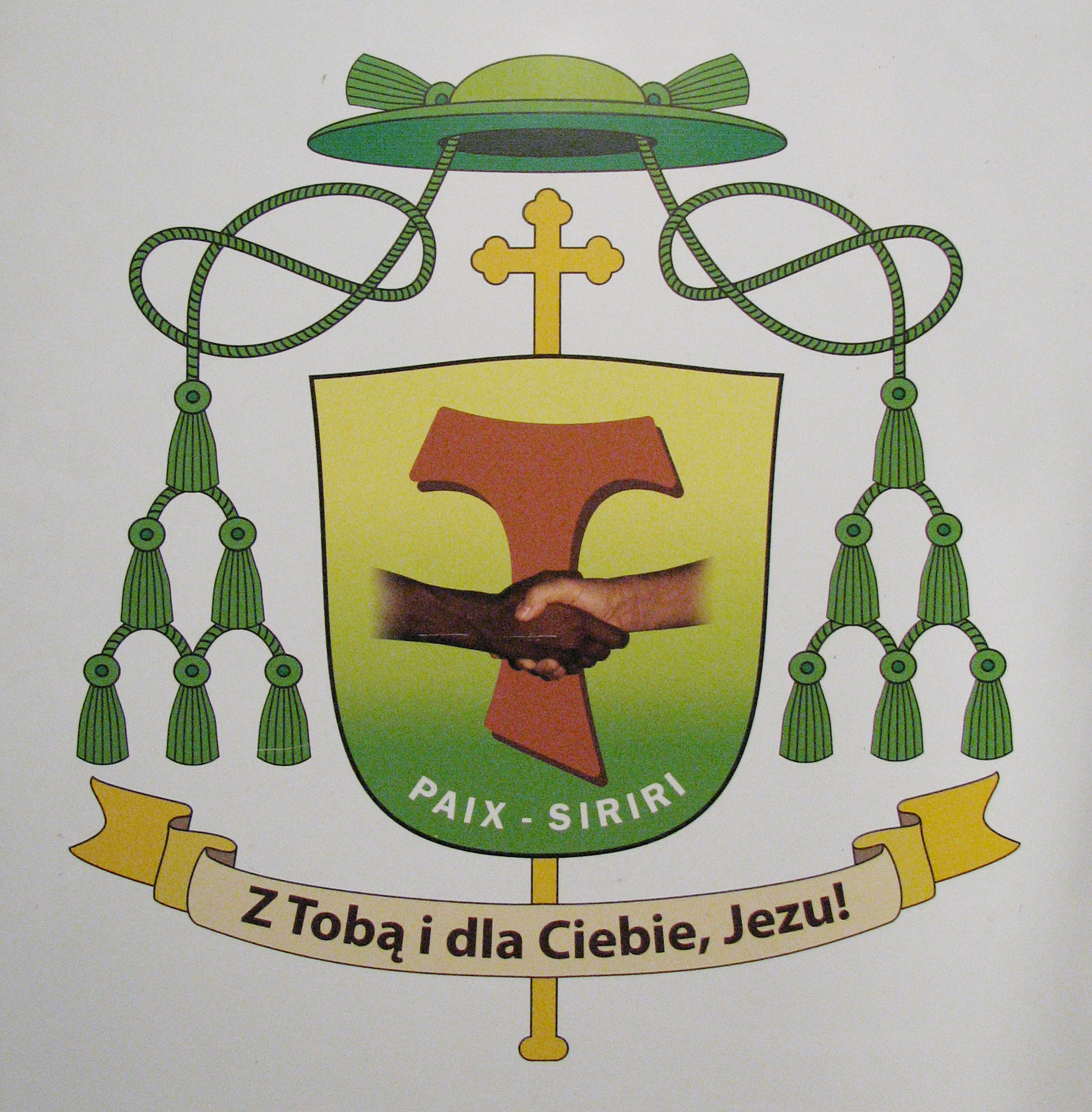
- Coat of arms

Styles of Tadeusz Kusy
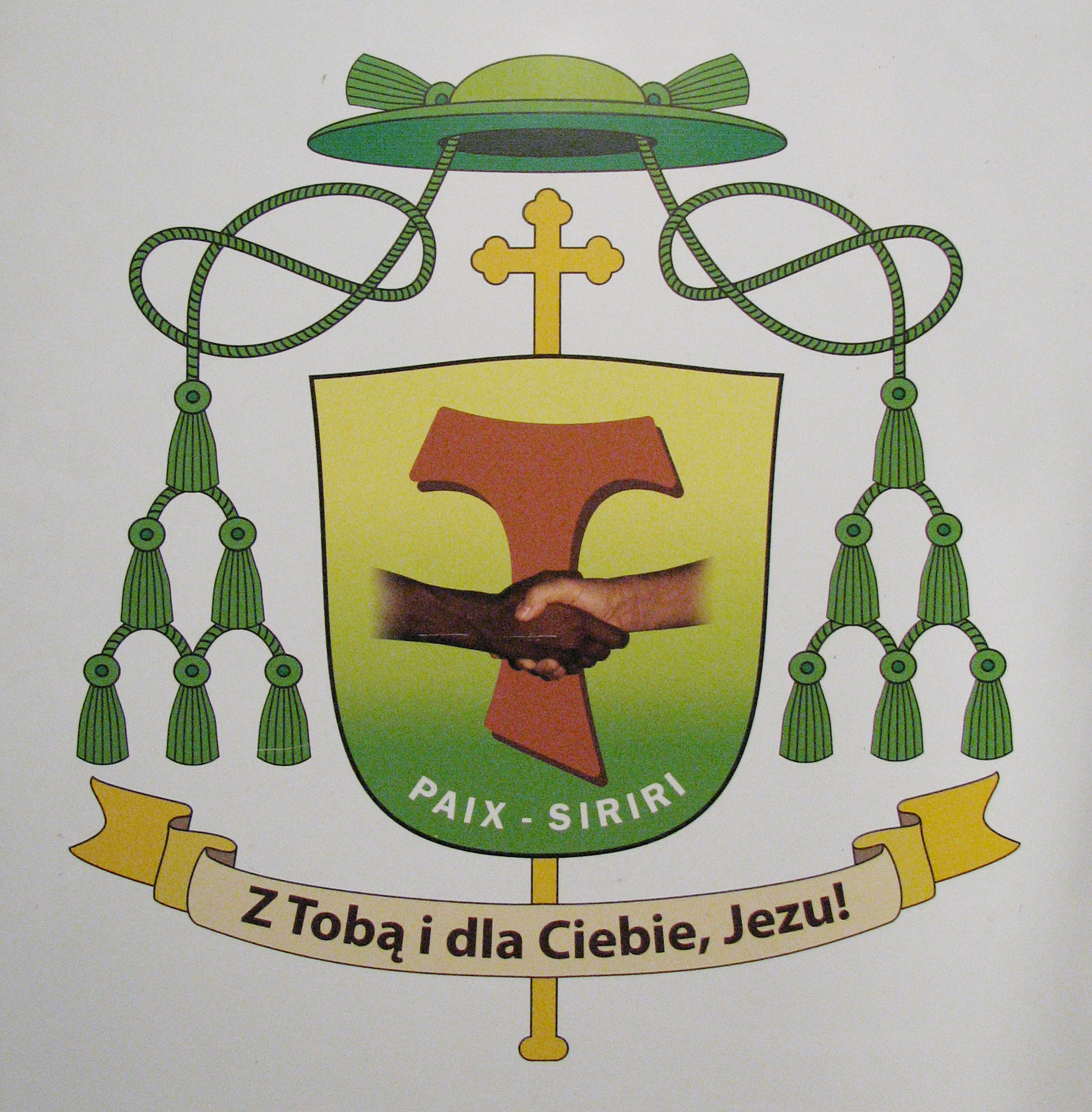
- Reference style: His Excellency; The Most Reverend
- Spoken style: Your Excellency
- Religious style: Bishop

Tadeusz Zbigniew Kusy, O.F.M. (2 December 1951 – 31 March 2024) was a Polish Franciscan missionary and bishop of Kaga-Bandoro in the Central African Republic.

== Biography ==
Born in Cieszyn, Kusy became a member of the Franciscan Order in Katowice in 1968. He made his perpetual vows in 1974, and was ordained to the priesthood on 15 April 1976. After working in parish in Katowice Panewniki, he became a missionary in Zaire in 1979. In the years 1986–1989 he studied at the Institute of Science and Theology of Religions in Paris, France. He returned to the Central African Republic in 1986. Father Kusy was an educator of young brothers in Bimbo in the Archdiocese of Bangui. He chaired the commission for the consecrated life, and was a member of the Archbishop's college of consultors.

On 31 May 2014, Pope Francis appointed him bishop coadjutor of Kaga-Bandoro. Father Kusy received his episcopal consecration on the following 15 August from Dieudonné Nzapalainga, Archbishop of Bangui, with bishop of Kaga-Bandoro, Albert Vanbuel, and bishop emeritus of Kole in the Democratic Republic of the Congo, Stanislas Lukumwena Lumbala, serving as co-consecrators. On 27 September 2015, he was named bishop of the Roman Catholic Diocese of Kaga-Bandoro.

Kusy died on Easter Sunday, 31 March 2024, at the age of 72.

Catholic Church titles
Preceded by Albert Vanbuel	Bishop of Kaga-Bandoro; 2015–2024	Succeeded by Vacant
