= Mbali, Ouham-Fafa =

Mbali
- Location in Central African Republic
- Coordinates: 7°11′47″N 17°40′23″E
- Country: Central African Republic
- Prefecture: Ouham-Fafa
- Sub-prefecture: Batangafo
- Commune: Bédé

Mbali is a village situated in Ouham-Fafa Prefecture, Central African Republic.

== History ==
In February or March 2015, an unknown armed group attacked Mbali, leading the residents to flee to Kaboro. The village received another attack from an armed militia on 12 and 18 November 2015, killing two and injuring five people. Due to the attack, the villagers sought refuge in Katie, Kabodjo, and Kangoro. Some of the residents returned to the village in February 2016.

FACA attacked armed bandits from Chad on 17 August 2022, eliminating six of them.

== Education ==
Mbali has one school. Seleka occupied the school from August 2013 to July 2016, and during its occupation, they burned desks and books. The school was reopened in March 2017.

== Healthcare ==
There is a health post in the village.
