= Farazala =

- Location in Central African Republic
- Coordinates: 7°23′6″N 18°44′26″E
- Country: Central African Republic
- Prefecture: Ouham-Fafa
- Sub-prefecture: Kabo
- Commune: Ouaki

Farazala is a village situated in Ouham-Fafa Prefecture, Central African Republic.

== History ==
Presidential Guard forces led by Lt. Eugene Ngaïkosset burned three houses and arrested the village chief and a woman to know the location of the APRD base. An unidentified person torched more than 60 houses in Farazala on 4 June 2012, killing one person. FPR controlled Farazala in October 2012 and it posted its 36 militia.

A clash between an armed militia and herders ensued in Farazala on 25 June 2018, killing 3 persons and injuring 3 and causing the villagers to seek refuge in the bush and nearby villages. From 9 to 14 August 2021, a heavy rain poured Farazala, leading to the collapse of 64 houses.

As of December 2023, FACA controlled Farazala. An armed group burned the village on 6 November 2024, prompting the residents to flee.

== Education ==
Farazala has one school. In 2012, the school was closed.

== Healthcare ==
The village has one health center. MSF used to manage the health center before it handed its operation to the Central African Ministry of Health on 1 October 2022 due to the insecurity, the closure of Kabo Airstrip, and poor road conditions.
