= Fort Crampel Affair =

1903 criminal case involving two French colonial officials

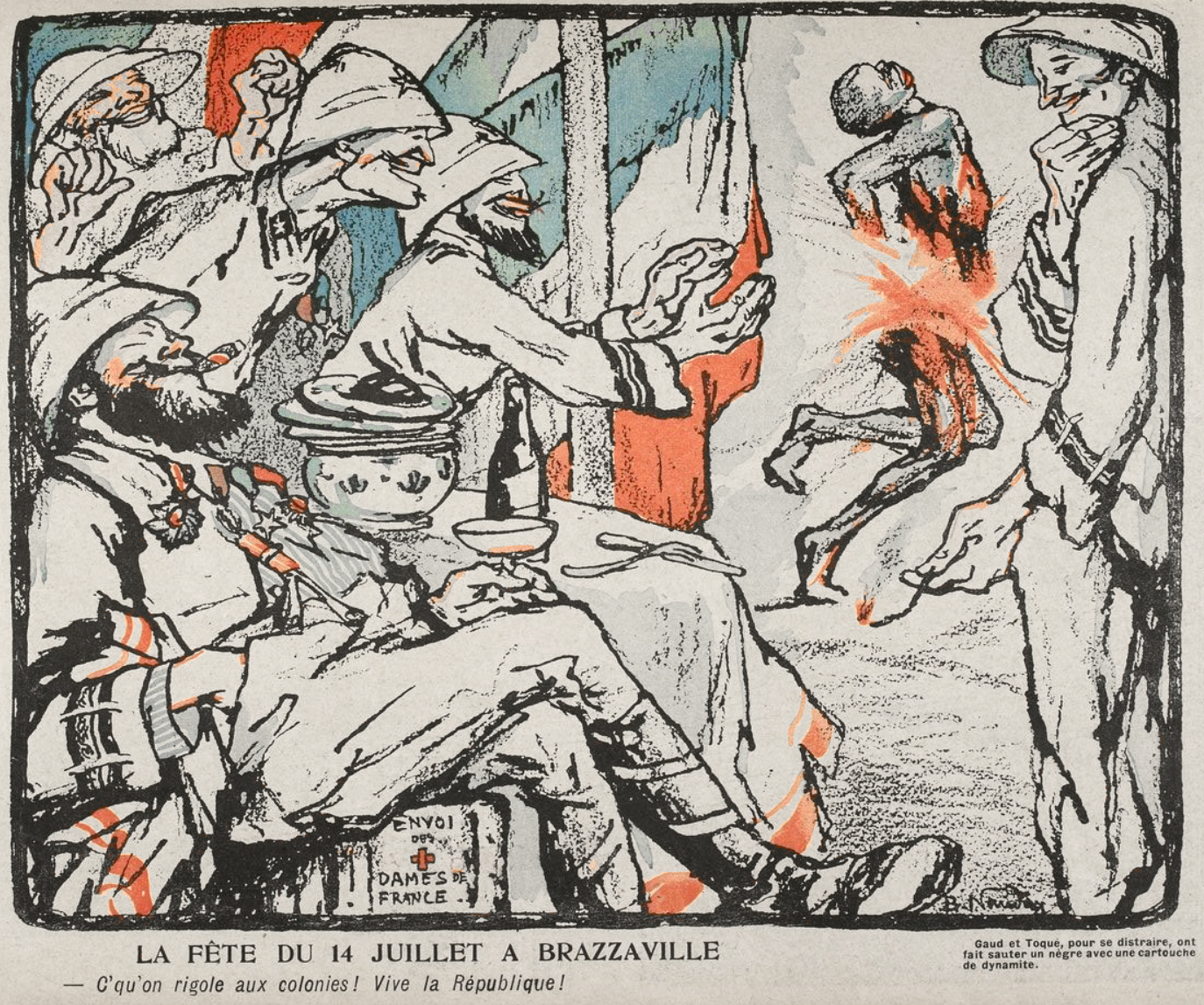
The execution with dynamite, caricatured by Bernard Naudin in L' Assiette au beurre, March 11, 1905.

The Fort-Crampel Affair or Gaud-Toqué Affair was a legal scandal in France in 1905 after two colonial officials were accused of arbitrarily executing several native people. This included one execution performed with a cartridge of dynamite at Fort Crampel, in what is now the Central African Republic. Both officials accused, Georges Toqué and Fernand Gaud, were sentenced to five years in prison.

== Context ==
=== Officials involved ===
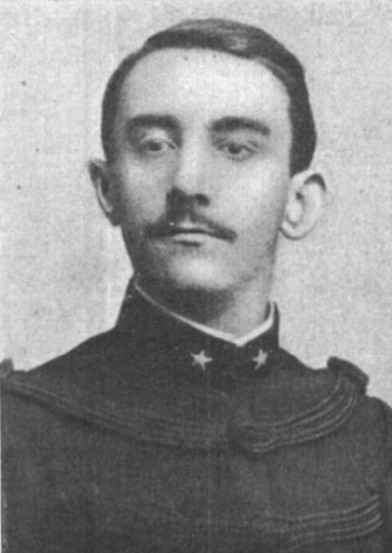
Georges Toqué

Georges Toqué was a 24-year-old civil servant trained by the Colonial School. In September 1901, he was assigned to Upper Shari (Haut-Chari) as a 3rd class colonial administrator and was in charge of the post.

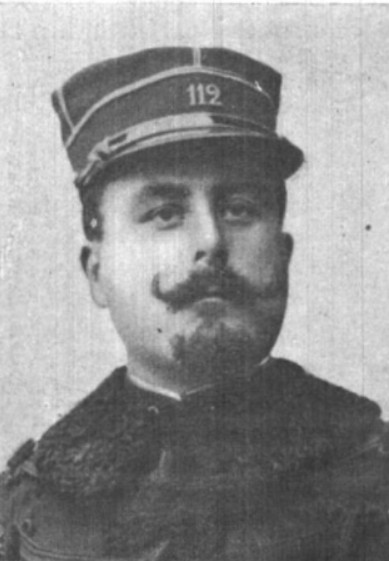
Fernand Gaud

Fernand Gaud was born in 1874. He was a former pharmacy student from Carpentras. He was sent to the French Congo as part of his military service in September 1900. He held various positions in Bangui, Brazzaville, and then Fort-Crampel, where he was a 1st class clerk for indigenous affairs. Gaud was known to be especially authoritarian and violent with the native people, whom he called niamagounda (“bush beast”). According to him this nickname meant nothing in the Yakoma language and he invented it to call his native subordinates "dirty beasts."

== The summary execution of July 14, 1903 ==
On July 14, 1903, three native people were being held as prisoners at the post of Fort-Crampel in a grain silo which served temporarily as a cell. One of them was Pakpa, who had been arrested two days earlier. He had worked as a guide for Georges Toqué, but the administrator suspected him of treason after an ambush and ordered Fernand Gaud to capture and shoot him. After the arrest, Toqué did not follow through with the execution and locked Pakpa in the silo instead.

Gaud asked if he should release the prisoners in honor of Bastille Day to his superior, Toqué. Toqué ordered the first two to be released. Concerning Pakpa, he said, "Do what you want with him." Believing this implied approval, Gaud decided to execute him. Rather than form a firing squad, he took a cartridge of dynamite intended for blast fishing from his box. He then strapped it to Pakpa with the help of a regional guard, and detonated it. Gaud said during his trial that the dynamite was tied to Pakpa's neck, but other accounts report that it was strapped to the victim's back or anus. Gaud then reported the execution to Toqué, who disapproved of the method of execution but did not punish his subordinate.

At the trial, the defendants recalled that they said before the execution: “It looks stupid; but it will stun the natives. If they don't keep quiet after that, fire from Heaven will rain on the black who did not want to befriend the white." Fernand Gaud went on to say that he wanted those around him to see the absurdity of this death: "No trace of a rifle shot, no trace of an assegai blow. It's by a kind of miracle that the man who didn't want to make friends with the whites died."

== Trial ==
The Ministry of Colonies decided that the trial of Gaud and Toqué should be held in Brazzaville in order to minimize its media coverage. The only journalist present was the correspondent for Le Temps Félicien Challaye. He accompanied Pierre Savorgnan de Brazza in his investigation of the crimes. The hearing opened on August 21, 1905.

Gaud remained apathetic and claimed to be ill during the trial. Toqué defended himself aggressively and openly denounced the conditions of colonization. He admitted to subjecting natives to forced labor for portage or tax collection and detaining their families to ensure their obedience. This mistreatment led many native people to die of starvation or disease. As there was no judicial institution in Fort-Crampel, Toqué felt he had the power to dispense justice with the approval of his superiors. The charges were numerous. The court only seriously considered the facts for which Gaud and Toqué had mutually accused each other during the investigation. Toqué wholly blamed Gaud for the execution of Pakpa; Gaud accused Toqué of ordering the murder of the porter Ndagara by throwing him in the falls of the Nana River. Toqué defended himself by pointing out inconsistencies in Gaud's account and by asserting that Ndagara was assassinated by a regional guard acting on his own. Toqué's account was contradicted by correspondence he exchanged with Gaud where he joked about Ndagara's death.

On August 26, 1905, the two defendants were each sentenced to five years in prison, benefiting from lenient sentencing. Fernand Gaud was found guilty of the non-premeditated murder of Pakpa, as well as the beatings several native people; Georges Toqué was found to be an accomplice in the murder of Ndagara. These penalties were perceived as harsh by the white settlers of Brazzaville, who were surprised that so much value was given to the native population.

== Brazza's investigation ==
When news of the events reached Paris in early 1905, the French public and press became engrossed by the scandal. The Journal des Débats proposed an administrative inquiry, and a commission chaired by Pierre Savorgnan de Brazza was appointed. Also appointed were: Charles Hoarau-Desruisseaux, Inspector General of the Colonies; Félicien Challaye, a young philosophy professor representing the Ministry of Education; a member of the Colonial Cabinet; and a delegate of the Minister of Foreign Affairs. The commission received an extraordinary budget of 268,000 francs. On April 5, 1905, Brazza left Marseille and arrived in Libreville to begin the investigation on April 29. Brazza discovered the horrors of the Congo, especially in Ubangi-Shari.

The only written account of what he found comes from Félicien Challaye: women and children were abducted and held in prison camps until the husband or father harvested enough rubber. In Bangui, the hostages were locked up in the garrison and forced to clean. When the men brought the rubber and the quantity seemed insufficient, the hostages are not released. The women paddled alone in canoes, and the Ndris auxiliaries and the regional guards beat them harshly when they stopped. Sixty-six prisoners in Bangui were locked in a six-meter-long hut without light. It was said to reeking of excrement. In the first twelve days, twenty-five died and their bodies were thrown into the river. A newly arrived doctor heard screams and moans, had the hut opened and protested against this brutality. Only twenty-one hostages remained. The twenty-one remaining survivors were sent back to their villages, but several were so weak that they died soon after their release. Near Fort Crampel, Brazza found an abandoned body lying by the side of the path and ordered that it be buried according to custom. When he discovered a concentration camp in Fort Crampel, he collapsed – his moral pain was compounded by diarrhea.

During this time, Hoarau-Desruisseaux was not allowed to meet with Brazza on the false grounds that there was not enough money for travel. This was reflected in Brazza's report No. 148, date August 21, 1905: “I have already expressed serious reservations. I hereby confirm them. They were not motivated by the observation of an isolated fact. During my trip, I acquired the very clear feeling that the Department was not kept informed of the real situation in which the native populations find themselves and of the procedures employed in their regard. Everything was done during my visit to this region to prevent me from learning about it." The young Félicien Challaye was even more severe, feeding the newspaper Le Temps raw, unvarnished articles. The Colonial Administration pretended to ignore Brazza out of embarrassment. Administrator Émile Gentil considered returning to France to defend himself, but the minister asked him to remain and supervise Brazza.

Feeling weaker and deciding that he has seen enough, Brazza himself decided to return after five months. On the return journey, the severity of his fever finally forced Brazza to stop at the hospital in Libreville. He disembarked the boat after making his recommendations to Charles Hoarau-Desruisseaux in order to save “his” Congo and France from shame. Watched over by his wife and by Captain Mangin, doctors determined Brazza did not have long. At his request, a photograph of his son Jacques who died two years earlier at the age of five, was placed on the bedside table. He died around six o'clock in the evening, September 14, 1905, after receiving his last rites.

General Charles de Gaulle held Brazza in high esteem. When France was liberated in 1944, one of his first acts was to significantly increase his family's pension, who had been living in poverty in Algiers. Only two French people have received a life pension for themselves and their direct descendants: Louis Pasteur and Brazza.
