= Bogomerom Archipelago =

Coordinates: 13°29′05.3″N 13°53′13.2″E

The Bogomerom Archipelago (French: Archipel de Bogomeron) was a group of islands in Lake Chad. Because of falling water levels in the lake, the former Bogomerom Archipelago is now part of the mainland. The archipelago lay partly in Nigeria and partly in Chad. Because the area is now part of the mainland, the current exact border is in dispute between these two nations.
