= Bahr el-Ghazal (wadi in Chad) =

Coordinates: 17.0311°N 18.2208°E

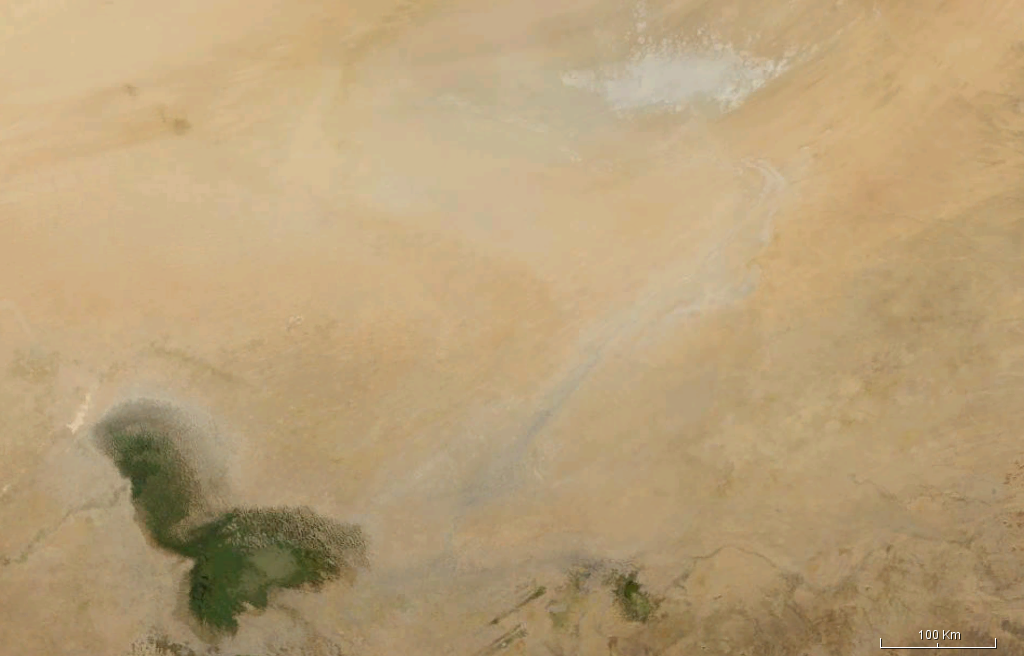

Location
- Country: Chad

The Bahr el-Ghazal (بحر الغزال) is a wadi, or dry riverbed, in central Chad. When water flows through it (which in modern times happens only in rare, extreme rainfall events), it flows from southwest to northeast, away from Lake Chad and into the Bodélé Depression.

The "sill" of the Bahr el-Ghazal is the lowest point on the drainage divide between the Lake Chad and Bodélé basins. In the past, when Lake Chad filled to this point and overflowed, it was drained by the Bahr el-Ghazal.
