= Lake Chad Basin Commission =

Intergovernmental organization overseeing the Lake Chad Basin

The Lake Chad Basin Commission (LCBC or CBLT in French) is an intergovernmental organization that oversees water and other natural resource usage in the basin. There are eight member governments—i.e., Cameroon, Chad, Niger, Nigeria, Algeria, the Central African Republic, Libya, and Sudan—chosen for their proximity to Lake Chad.

The organization's secretariat is located in N'Djamena, Chad. The LCBC is Africa's oldest river or lake-basin organization. In its founding document (the Convention and Statutes relating to the Development of the Chad Basin) the parties commit themselves to a shared use of the basin's natural resources. It is a member of the International Network of Basin Organizations (INBO).

== History ==
The Lake Chad Basin Commission was created in 1964 by the four countries bordering Lake Chad: Cameroon, Chad, Niger and Nigeria. The Republic of Central Africa joined the organization in 1996, Libya was admitted in 2008. Observer status is held by Sudan, Egypt, the Republic of Congo and the Democratic Republic of Congo. The aims of the commission are to regulate and control the use of water and other natural resources in the basin and to initiate, promote, and coordinate natural resource development projects and research.

== Membership and funding ==
Hydrologically, the Chad Basin (not all of which feeds Lake Chad) includes eight countries, which, in descending area of land, included are: Chad, Niger, the Central African Republic, Nigeria, Sudan, Algeria, and Libya.

Cameroon, Niger, Nigeria and Chad (the four countries directly containing parts of Lake Chad and its wetlands) signed the Fort Lamy (today N'Djamena) Convention on May 22, 1964, which created the Lake Chad Basin Commission. The Central African Republic joined in 1996, and Libya joined in 2008. Sudan was admitted in July 2000, but has observer status because it has not ratified the founding convention. Algeria has not yet participated, but will eventually be interested in such in the future.

The other countries with observer status are Egypt—in the neighboring Nile Basin—and the Republic of Congo and the Democratic Republic of Congo which are fed by the Ubangi River being considered for diversion into Lake Chad.

The member countries fund the commission's $1 million annual budget based on an agreed-upon formula: Nigeria 52%, Cameroon 26%, Chad 11%, Niger 7%, the Central African Republic 4%.

== Activities ==
The commission's Basin Committee for Strategic Planning (BCSP), coordinates local activities between the member states.

The LCBC controls the hydro-active regions in the Chad Basin, called the Conventional Basin. The initial Conventional Basin consisted of approximately 427,500 km^{2} of the total area of the Chad basin in 1964. The definition says it excluded the majority of the terminal depression consisting of desert that provides little or no effective hydrological contribution to the Conventional Basin. This was subsequently expanded to include additional watersheds in northern Nigeria, southern Chad, and northern Central African Republic, with a current total area of 967,000 km^{2}.

Some projects of the LCBC member countries are linked with the GEF program. In November 2002, the LCBC signed a Memorandum of Understanding with the Bureau of the Ramsar Convention on Wetlands. In July 2000, Lake Chad was declared a Transboundary Ramsar Site of International Importance). The aim is to create a network of national and regional conservation areas in the Chad Basin and to set up institutions dedicated to their sustainable management. In this connection the Chad Wetlands Initiative (CHADWET) was launched in June 2003, organized by the Ramsar Bureau and its Mediterranean Coordination Unit. With the support of MEDWET (Mediterranean Wetlands), the Mediterranean branch of the Ramsar Convention, and its Coordination Unit, CHADWET is set to be developed on the model of MEDWET, again in the framework of the GEF program. With a view to obtaining funding, there were plans to present the CHADWET to the Ramsar Conference in November 2005 as a Ramsar Regional Initiative.

== See also ==
- Lake Chad replenishment project
- Waterway
