= Lake Chad replenishment project =

Proposed major water diversion scheme to prevent the drying up of Lake Chad

The Lake Chad replenishment project is a proposed major water diversion scheme to divert water from the Congo River basin to Lake Chad to prevent it drying up. Various versions have been proposed. Most would involve damming some of the right tributaries of the Congo River and channeling some of the water to Lake Chad via a canal to the Chari River basin.

It was first proposed in 1929 by Herman Sörgel as part of his Atlantropa project, as a way to irrigate the Sahara. In the 1960s, Lake Chad began to shrink, and the idea was revived as a solution to that problem.

The members of the Lake Chad Basin International Commission are Chad, the Central African Republic, Nigeria, Cameroon and Niger. Concerned by shrinkage of the lake's area from 20,000 square kilometres (7,700 sq mi) in 1972 to 2,000 square kilometres (770 sq mi) in 2002, they met in January 2002 to discuss the project. Both the ADB and the Islamic Development Bank expressed interest in the project. However, the member states of the Congo-Ubangi-Sangha Basin International Commission (Congo-Kinshasa, Congo-Brazzaville and the Central African Republic) expressed concern that the project would reduce the energy potential of the Inga hydroelectric dam, would affect navigation on the Ubangi and Congo rivers and would reduce fish catches on these rivers. However, even the largest proposals would divert less than 8% of the Congo's water, while the remaining 92-95% would not only reach Inga, but would produce electricity twice, first at the new dams and eventually at Inga.

In 2011, the Canadian firm CIMA, under contract from Lake Chad Basin Commission, produced a feasibility study of several versions of the project.

== Pumping from Ubangi ==
There are several proposals to divert water from the Ubangi River, the biggest tributary of the Congo. This requires pumping the water some 180 m uphill, so it requires a power source, either hydroelectric or solar. The CIMA study considered a version using a dam on the Ubangi to generate 360 MW of power, 250 MW of which would be used to pump water. It was estimated to deliver 91 m^{3}/s of water to the Chari at a cost of $10 billion.

A variant of this idea would pump water from the Ubangi using solar power instead of hydroelectric power, to avoid the expense and disruption of a dam.

== Damming Kotto ==
The CIMA feasibility study also considered diverting water from a dam on the Kotto River, a tributary of the Ubangi, near Bria. This is high enough to move water to the Chari by gravity, with no pumping needed. It was estimated to deliver 108 m^{3}/s at a cost of $4.5 billion.

== Transaqua ==
Transaqua (in red).

The most ambitious proposal, named Transaqua, was proposed by a team of engineers of the firm Bonifica. led by Dr. Marcello Vichi, It would dam not only the Kotto but also the other right tributaries to the south, including the much larger Mbomou, Uele and Aruwimi. The water would be carried north by a 2400 km navigable canal along a contour line, which would generate hydro-electricity at several points along its length. These would power new industrial townships, while the canal would replenish the lake. The total water delivered would be more than 1500 m^{3}/s, which is 5-8% of the Congo's average flow, and more than the current total inflow to Lake Chad. But the cost would be more than $50 billion.

This plan was initially considered unlikely to materialize as late as 2005. It was rejected in favor of a smaller water-transfer scheme from the Ubangi. The Lake Chad Basin Commission, however, judged that the project, which involved pumping water upwards from the Ubangi River, was not sufficient to replenish Lake Chad, and adopted Transaqua as the "only feasible" project at the International Conference on Lake Chad, on 26–28 Feb. 2018.

Following the ICLC, representatives of the LCBC and the Italian government signed a MoU for initial funding for the Transaqua feasibility study on 16 October 2018.

On 16 December 2019, an amendment introduced by Italian Sen. Tony Iwobi to the 2021 Italian budget law included a financing of 1.5 million Euro for the feasibility study.

On 13 November 2020, Former Italian Prime Minister, former EU Commission chief and former UN Special Envoy for the Sahel Romano Prodi stated that the populations around Lake Chad could not wait any longer and called for the EU, the UNO, the Organization for African Unity and China to join hands to finance and build Transaqua.

A large merit for the success of Transaqua has been attributed to activists from the LaRouche movement.

=== Alternative inland waterway ===
Congo River, inland navigation system.

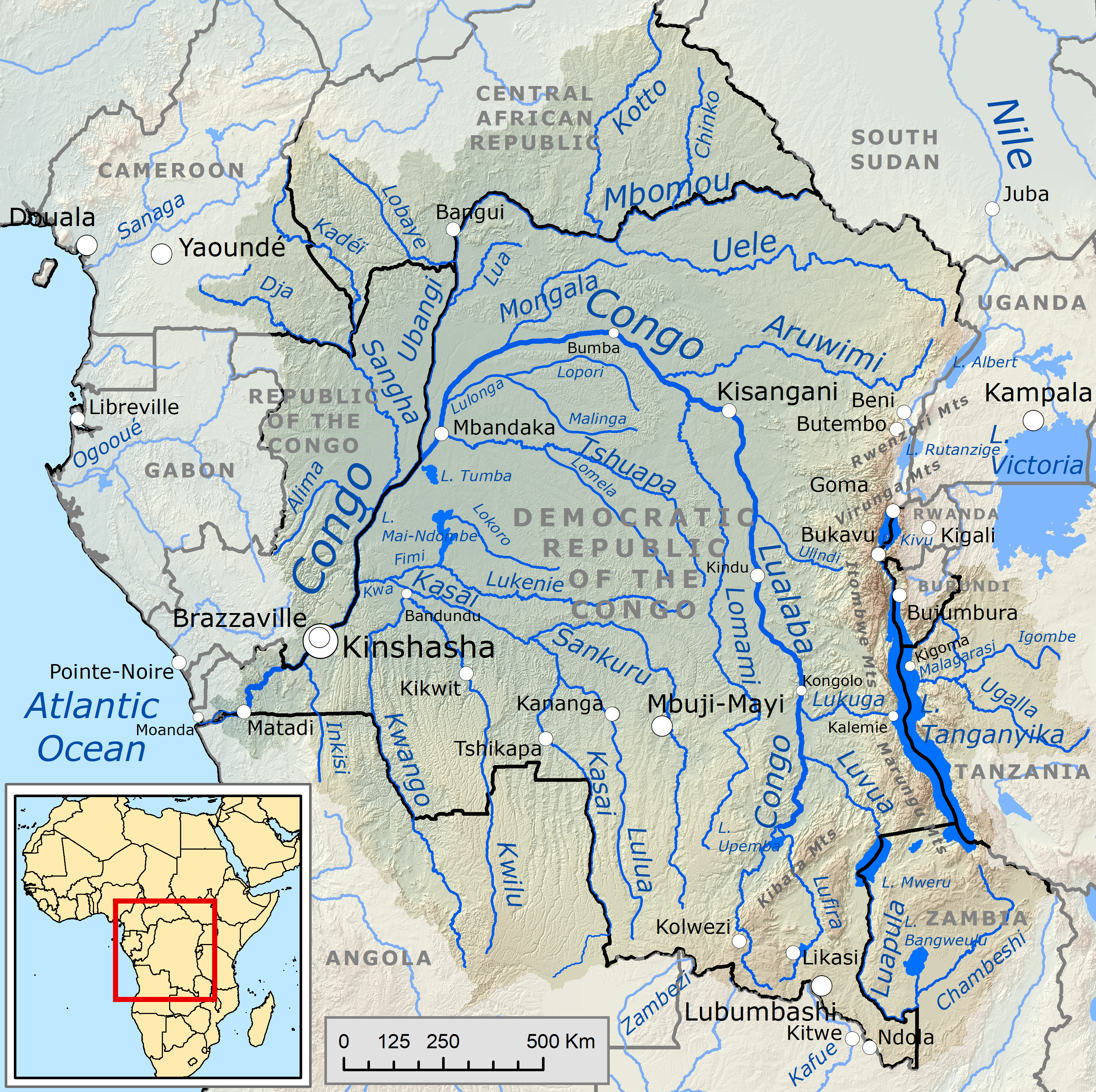
The drainage basin of the Congo River.

In addition to moving water, this proposal would create an inland waterway from the Ubangi River to the Chari River), around 366 km channel, from the Gigi River (close to Djoukou – Galabadja in Kémo), through Sibut, Bouca and then to Batangafo (over the Boubou River and into the Ouham River and then the Chari River).

This path is the same one used by the CIMA study (water flow 100 m^{3}/s, the same as the Moscow Canal), only sizing the channel and adapting the river and locks to support ships.

==== Chad-Congo inland waterway ====
This waterway could link Lake Chad with the Congo River inland navigation system and the waterway transport in the Democratic Republic of the Congo.

The navigable waterway system in Congo can be upgraded from Kinshasa to Matadi sea port, already planned as an option in the Inga dams project.

As well as it is "feasible" from Lake Mweru (Pweto city) through Luvua River to Ankoro (requiring dams and a Boat lift in Boyoma Falls, like the Three Gorges dam ship lift), or the waterway into the Lake Tanganyika in Kalemie through the Lukuga River up to Kabalo (Zanza village), now linked by railway.

- Description of Inland Waterways in the Congo from the UN Joint Logistics Centre

==== Comparison to other channels ====
A 366 km (227 mi) channel from the Ubangi to Chari would travel double the distance of the 171 km (106 mi) Rhine–Main–Danube Canal, three times the 128 km (80 mi) Moscow Canal or the 101 km (63 mi) Volga–Don Canal, or about the same length as the 368 km (229 mi) Volga–Baltic Waterway (that forms part of the Unified Deep Water System of European Russia). It would be five times shorter than China's 1,776 km (1,104 mi) Grand Canal (built during the Sui dynasty) and ten times shorter than the entire 3,770 km (2,340 mi) Saint Lawrence Seaway and Great Lakes Waterway (waterway from Duluth, Minnesota, to the Atlantic Ocean).
