= Lake Chad =

Lake in West-Central Africa

- بحيرة تشاد (Arabic); Sádǝ (Kanuri); Lac Tchad (French)
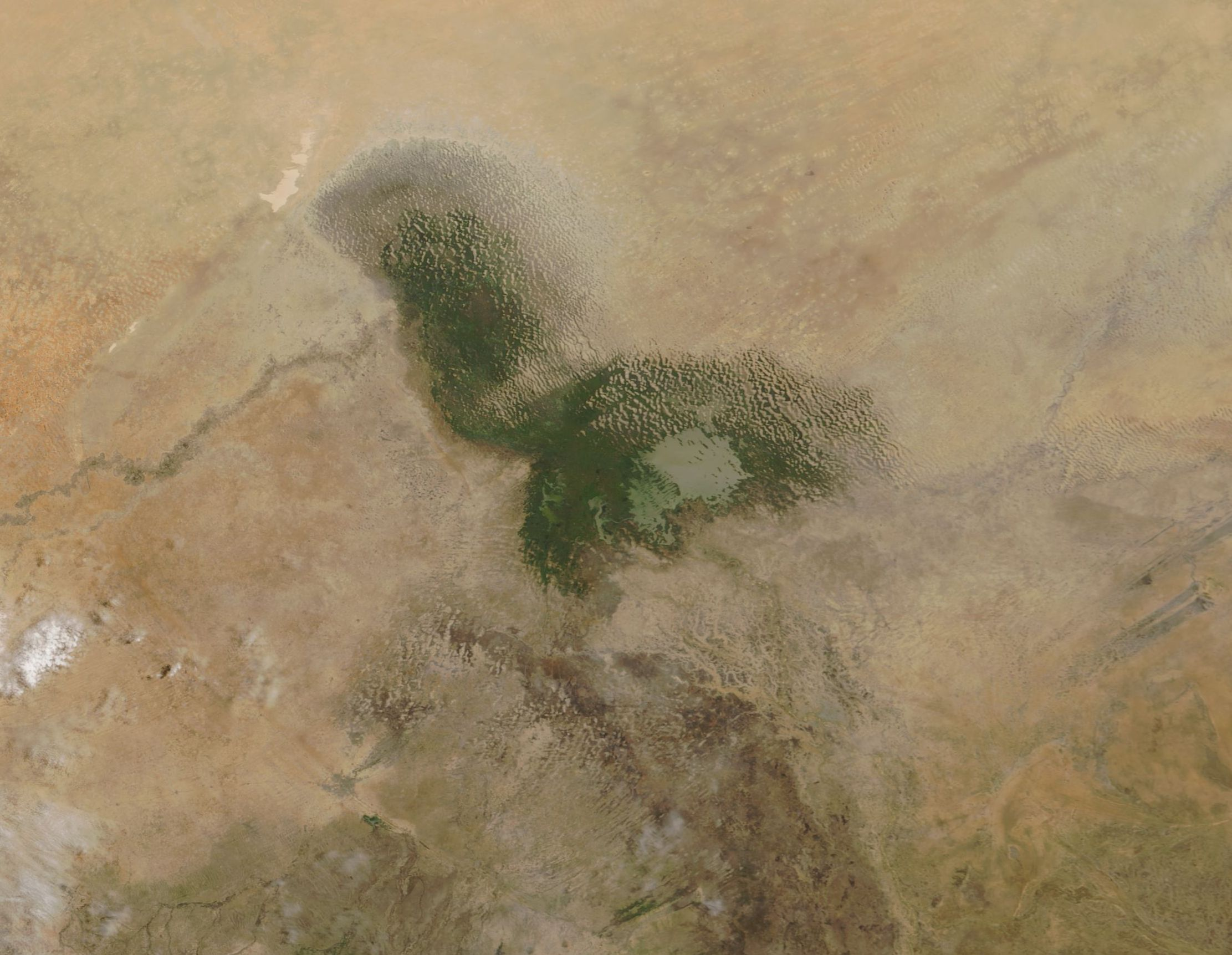
- Lake Chad in 2018

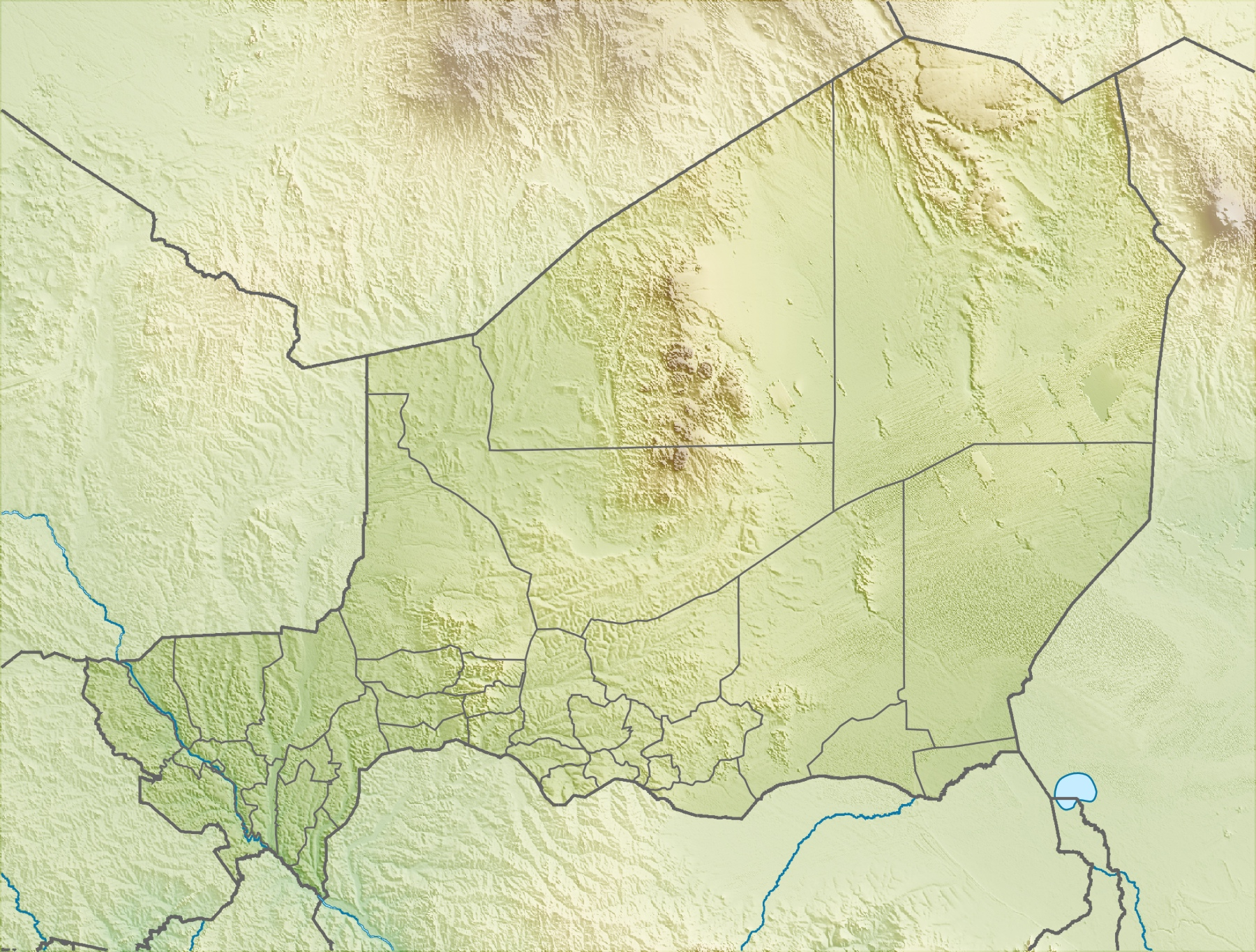
- Location within Chad Location within Cameroon Location within Niger Location within Nigeria Location within Africa
- Location: Sahelian zone at the conjunction of Chad, Cameroon, Nigeria, and Niger
- Coordinates: 13.099°N 14.533°E
- Primary inflows: Chari River, Yobe River, Ngadda River
- Primary outflows: Bahr el-Ghazal
- Basin countries: Chad, Cameroon, Nigeria, Niger
- Surface area: 2,000 km^{2} (770 sq mi)
- Max. depth: 2 m (6 ft 7 in)
- Islands: Bogomerom Archipelago
- Settlements: Bol, Chad; Abadam, Nigeria; Baga, Nigeria; N'guigmi, Niger; Bosso, Niger; Makary, Cameroon

Ramsar Wetland
- Official name: Lac Tchad
- Designated: 17 June 2001
- Reference no.: 1072

Ramsar Wetland
- Official name: Partie tchadienne du lac Tchad
- Designated: 14 August 2001
- Reference no.: 1134

Ramsar Wetland
- Official name: Lake Chad Wetlands in Nigeria
- Designated: 30 April 2008
- Reference no.: 1749

Ramsar Wetland
- Official name: Partie Camerounaise du Lac Tchad
- Designated: 2 February 2010
- Reference no.: 1903

Lake Chad (Arabic: بحيرة تشاد, Kanuri: Sádǝ, French: Lac Tchad) is an endorheic freshwater lake located at the junction of four countries: Nigeria, Niger, Chad, and Cameroon, in western and central Africa, with a catchment area in excess of 1,000,000 km^{2} (390,000 sq mi). It is an important wetland ecosystem in West-Central Africa. The lake is rich in aquatic resources and is one of the important freshwater fish-producing areas in Africa.

Lake Chad is divided into deeper southern parts and shallower northern parts. The lake's main source of water is the Chari River which has many tributaries. The water level varies greatly seasonally, and the area of the lake also changes dramatically. In the 19th century, it still had an area of 28,000 km^{2} (11,000 sq mi). However, due to climate change and human water diversion, the lake shrunk significantly between 1960 and 1990, the open water area decreasing from 25,000 km^{2} in 1960 to just 2000 km^{2} in 1980. The lake is now no longer estimated to be shrinking, as rainfall recovery has partially occurred. Despite the stabilisation of the lake's water volume, Lake Chad is still under threat from climate change.

== Prehistory and history ==
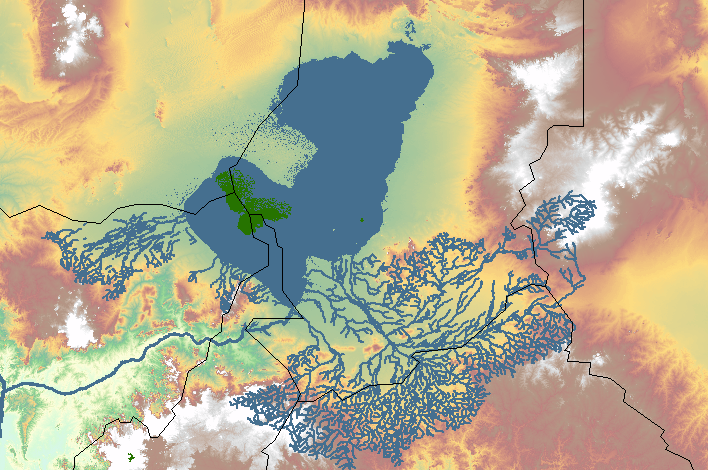
Lake Chad in African humid period (blue) and in 20th century (darker green surrounded by blue)

The Chad Basin was formed by the depression of the African Shield. The floor of the basin is made of Precambrian bedrock covered by more than 3,600 m (11,800 ft) of sedimentary deposits. For most of the Quaternary, the basin had abundant water sources. Towards the end of this period, the climate became drier. Around 20,000–40,000 years ago, eolianite sand dunes began to form in the north of the basin. The area of Lake Chad experienced four heydays between 39,000 BC and 300 BC, leaving thick diatomaceous earth and lacustrine deposits in the strata. This has been called Mega-Chad. The maximum depth of Mega-Chad exceeded 180 m (590 ft) and it covered an area of approximately 400,000 km^{2} (150,000 sq mi), it flowed into Benue River through the Mayo Kébbi, which drains into the Atlantic Ocean through the Niger River.

The vast waters formed during the African humid period provided conditions for the emergence of lakeside fishermen's settlements, and the Nilo-Saharan ethnic group also migrated to Lake Chad during this period. Agriculture also emerged in the Sahel region at this time. By 1800 BC, a pottery culture known as Gajiganna had emerged, initially as pastoralists, but, starting around 1500 BC, living in settled hamlets at the side of the lake. The archaeological discovery revealed wild grasses, mostly of the tribe Paniceae, and wild rice together with the earliest domesticated Pearl millet in the Lake Chad region, dating to 1200–1000 cal BC. One of the oldest domesticated Pearl millet in West Africa was found in the Chad Basin, charred together with wild grasses, and their era can be traced back to 800–1000 cal BC.

Permanent villages were established to the south of the lake by 500 BC, and major archaeological discoveries include the Sao civilization. According to the records of Claudius Ptolemy in the mid-2nd century AD, the Romans of the 1st century AD had already come into contact with Lake Chad through their connections with Tunisia, Tripolitania, and Fezzan. By the 5th century AD camels were being used for trans-Saharan trade via the Fezzan, or to the east via Darfur. After the Arabs conquered North Africa during the 7th and 8th centuries, the Chad Basin became increasingly linked to the Muslim countries.

Trade and improved agricultural techniques enabled more sophisticated societies. Around 900 AD, the Kanem people who spoke the Kanuri language unified numerous nomadic tribes and established the Kanem Empire in the northeast of Lake Chad. At the beginning of the founding of the country, the Kanem people continued to live a nomadic life until the 11th century, when they were Islamized and settled in Njimi. Through trans-Saharan trade, the power of the Kanem Empire reached its peak in the 13th century, but as the empire declined in the 14th century, its southwestern vassal state of Bornu began to rise, causing the power center of the empire to shift to Bornu around 1400. In 1574, the Ottoman Empire had invaded Fezzan and the Oasis, and even reached into Lake Chad. This was the deepest Ottoman incursion into the interior of Africa before the nineteenth century. The Ottoman Empire extended its influence on the central region of the Sahel during the reign of Murad III. Lake Chad became a part of the Ottoman sphere of influence, and in the second half of the 16th century, the Bornu Empire began importing firearms from the Ottoman Empire, consolidating its military hegemony. The Bornu Empire declined in the 18th century, and later lost its western region to the Sokoto Caliphate during the early 19th century. It was later colonised by European powers in the 20th century.

Following the growing interest in Africa among European academic and business communities, the Lake Chad area was extensively described by Europeans in the 19th century. Three scientific expeditions were conducted between 1898 and 1909. During the Berlin Conference in 1884–1885, Africa was divided between the European colonial powers. By the second decade of the 20th century, Lake Chad had been colonized and occupied by Britain, France, and Germany, defining boundaries that are largely intact with the present post-colonial states. At the beginning of independence, the countries surrounding Lake Chad not only had a poor economic foundation, but also had more complex ethnic, religious, and political conflicts. Nigeria and Niger, which had just gained independence, experienced continuous coups, while Chad also experienced ongoing civil war. The inability of countries along the lake to consider the protection of Lake Chad has led to a series of environmental problems.

== Geography ==
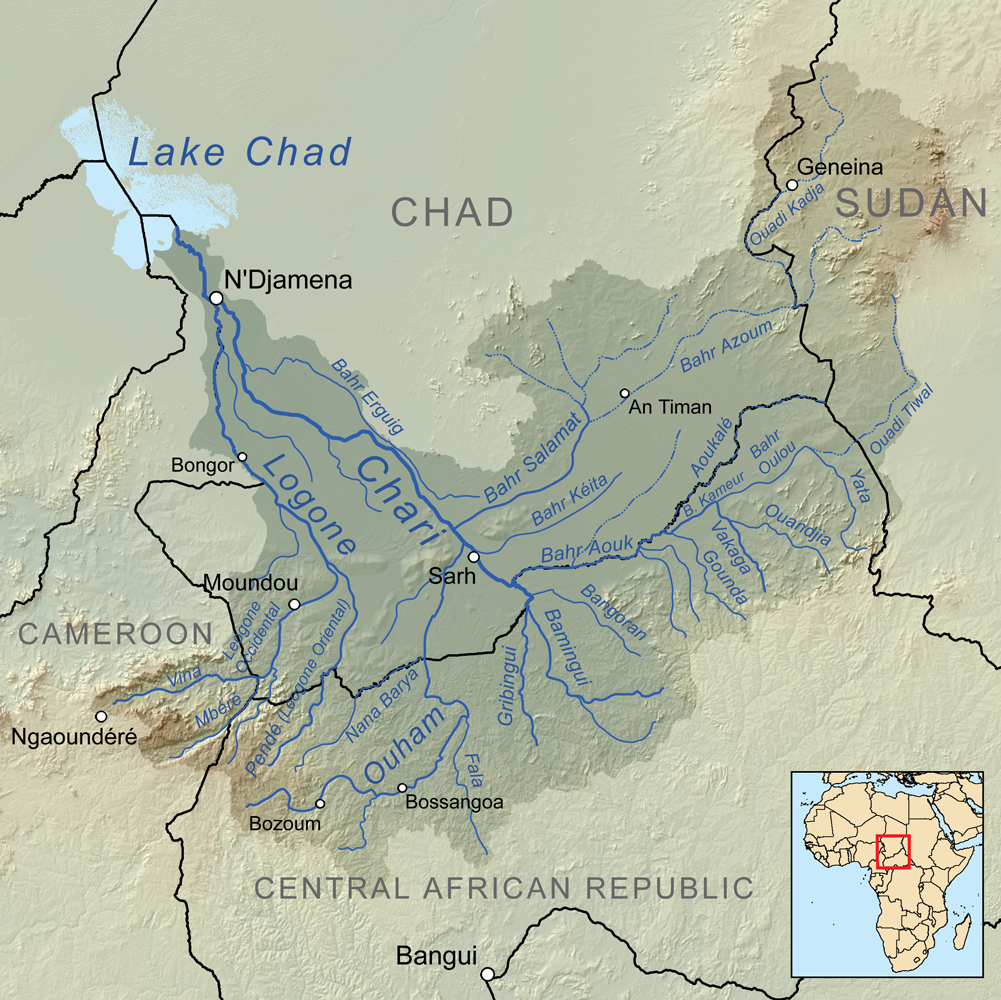
Map showing the Chari River drainage basin

The Chad Basin includes Chad, Nigeria, Cameroon, Niger, Sudan, and the Central African Republic. It is an extensional fault depression type rift basin, which can be divided into four secondary structural units: southern depression, northern depression, central uplift, and eastern slope. The southern depression of the basin is characterized by an asymmetric fault depression composite rift with steep slopes in the east and gentle slopes in the west on the profile, and is distributed in an NNW direction on the plane. There are two large basin‐bounding normal faults developed on both sides of the basin, with a graben style fault and depression in the middle. The east and west sides are outward dipping low angle gentle slope areas. The eastern boundary fault is steep with a dip angle of about 55°, while the western fault has a dip angle of about 45°. The overall thickness of the inner layer in the slope area is relatively thin. In the central area of the basin, the thickness of the sedimentary strata is large, and the thickness of the sedimentary center zone reaches over 10,000 m (33,000 ft). The northern part of the basin appears steep in the west and gentle in the east on the profile. Five fault structural zones parallel to the basin‐bounding faults have developed from west to east.

Lake Chad is divided into north and south parts by a shallow sill called the Great Barrier, with the bottom of the northern basin at an altitude of 275.3 m (903 ft) and the bottom of the southern basin at 278.2 m (913 ft). When the water level in the south exceeds 279 m (915 ft) above sea level, it will flow into the north. In the south, there is continuous open water at the mouth of the Chari River, and the western part of the water is covered by reed swamps, and the sand dunes that are not completely submerged in the eastern waters form an archipelago. The average depth of the southern lake basin is between .5 and 2 m (1 ft 8 in and 6 ft 7 in), that of the northern lake basin is between 0 and 1.8 m (5 ft 11 in), and that of the eastern archipelago is between 0 and 2 m (6 ft 7 in).

The climate of the Lake Chad region is strongly influenced by continental and maritime air masses. The maritime air mass moves northward during the summer, producing seasonal precipitation. In late summer, continental air mass dominate again. The average annual precipitation in the Lake Chad area is 330 mm (13 in), with an average annual precipitation of 560 mm (22.0 in) on the south bank and about 250 mm (9.8 in) on the north bank. The highest temperature in the rainy season is 30 °C (86 °F), and the highest temperature rises to more than 32 °C (90 °F) when October and November enter the dry season. The temperature difference between day and night is almost twice that of the rainy season, and the lowest nighttime temperature sometimes drops to 8 °C (46 °F) in December and January. April is usually the hottest month of the year, with temperatures occasionally reaching 40 °C (104 °F), the lowest water levels appear in June to July, and the highest water levels in November to December, with surface water temperatures ranging from 19 to 32 °C (66 to 90 °F).

== Hydrology ==
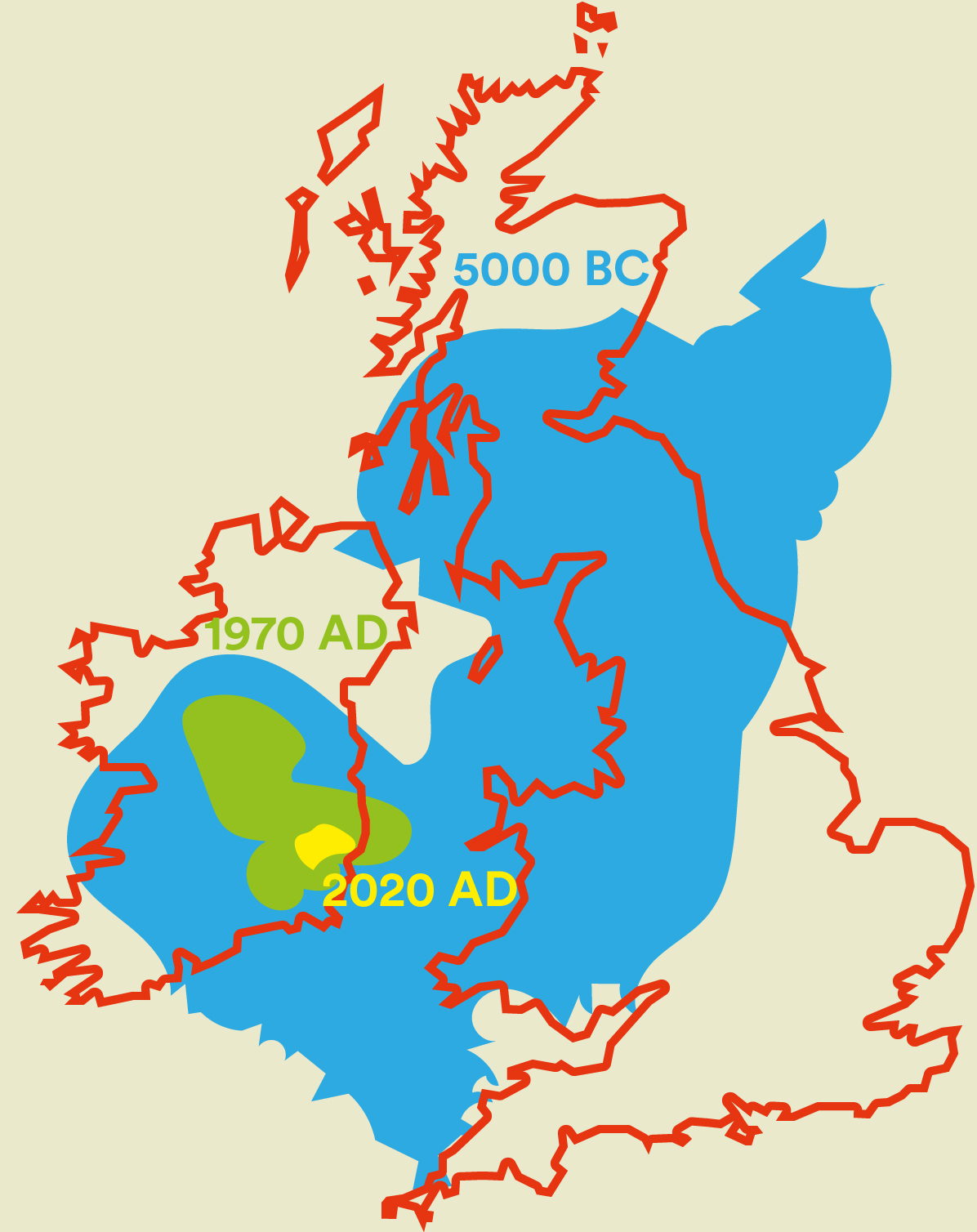
Shrinking of Lake Chad over the last 7000 years, with the outline of the British Isles for size comparison

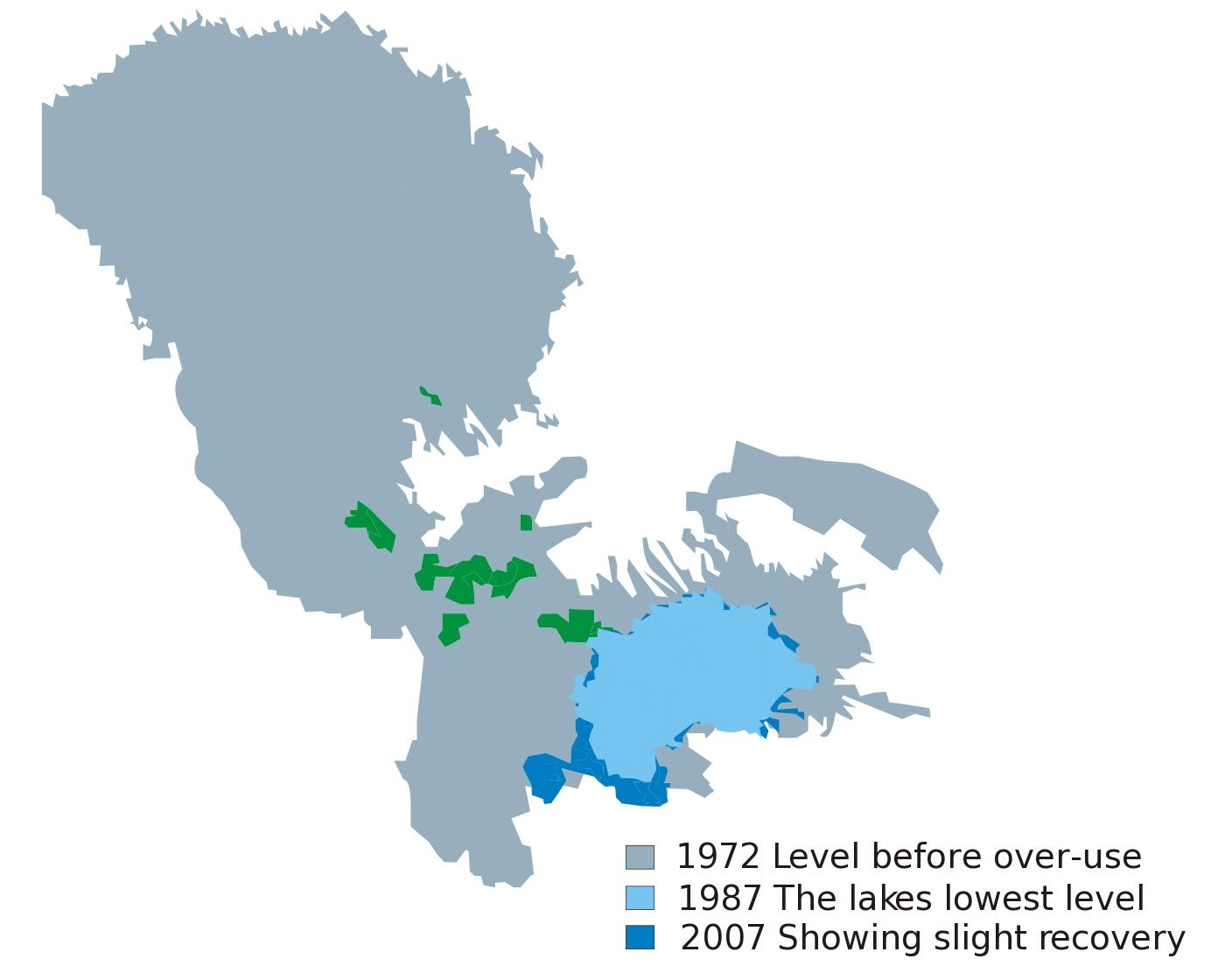
Lake Chad 1972–2007

The Chad Basin covers an area of about 1×10^{6} km^{2} (390,000 sq mi), and is injected by the Chari, Logone, and Yobe Rivers. Lake Chad is a shallow lake whose surface area varies considerably in response to rainfall, river inflows and climate conditions across its drainage basin. According to the United Nations Environment Programme, its surface area declined by 90 per cent from early 1960s to the present. The water supply of the lake is seasonal. Most of the precipitation comes from the Adamawa Plateau in the south of the basin, which is transported to the lake basin through the Chari River and the Logone River. The two contribute 95% of the total inflow of Lake Chad, while the Yobe River only contributes less than 2.5%. The lake seeps through the underground to the lowest point of the Chad Basin, the Bodélé Depression, approximately 480 km (300 mi) northeast of Lake Chad, with the deepest point reaching an elevation of only 155 m (509 ft) above sea level. This takes away most of the salinity and maintains the low salinity of Lake Chad. The southwestern waters of Lake Chad being freshwater, and the water in the northeast is only slightly salty. The corresponding variability in rainfall appears to have been related to the effects of environmental degradation.

The water volume of most large lakes in Africa depends on rainfall and evaporation, which means that temperature and precipitation are crucial for regulating the water balance of these bodies of water, and any fluctuations can cause significant changes in their water level and area. Lake Chad is a shallow inland lake, and the rainfall in the Chad basin is very sensitive to small changes in atmospheric circulation, so the surface area of Lake Chad is greatly affected by climate change. Dry climate due to vegetation loss from overgrazing and deforestation and large-scale irrigation projects that diverted water from the rivers that feed the lake are the main reasons for the shrinkage of Lake Chad. The Atlantic multidecadal oscillation and the El Niño–Southern Oscillation have affected precipitation in the Sahel region. From the early 1960s to the mid-1980s, the lake water level decreased by 3 m (9.8 ft) compared to the average level from 1900 to 2010.

In 1870, the area of Lake Chad was about 28,000 km^{2} (11,000 sq mi). The lake was able to flow out of the Bahr el-Ghazal during the rainy season. At the turn of the 20th century the area of Lake Chad shrank briefly, and reached a new high in the middle of the 20th century and overflowed from the Bahr el-Ghazal again. A major drought started in the Sahel region in the late 1960s and caused severe damage in 1972 and 1984. It was thought to be related to vegetation loss, global warming, and sea surface temperature anomalies. During this period, Lake Chad shrunk considerably and fluctuated in the range of 2,000 to 5,000 km^{2} (770 to 1,930 sq mi) thereafter.

From June 1966 to January 1973, the area of Lake Chad shrank from 22,772 to 15,400 km^{2} (8,792 to 5,946 sq mi), further shrunk to 4,398 km^{2} (1,698 sq mi) in 1975, and only 1,756 km^{2} (678 sq mi) in February 1994. Since then, the area of Lake Chad has entered a relatively stable stage with a slight increase. From 1995 to 1998, it fluctuated within the range of 1,200 to 4,500 km^{2} (460 to 1,740 sq mi). The area once reached 5,075 square kilometres (1,959 sq mi) in 2000, and the average area of surface water from 2013 to 2016 was about 1,876 km^{2} (724 sq mi), with the largest area being 2,231 km^{2} (861 sq mi) in July 2015.

=== Quaternary aquifer and groundwater resilience ===
Beneath the lake lies the unconfined Quaternary phreatic aquifer, a massive transboundary water resource spanning approximately 500,000 square kilometers across Chad, Niger, Nigeria, and Cameroon. While the lake loses approximately 2,200mm/year of water to potential evapotranspiration, isotopic studies utilizing stable isotopes and tritium show that the underlying groundwater system remains highly resilient to climate change.

The Quaternary aquifer actively recharges through two primary processes: direct infiltration of intense seasonal rainfall events and lateral seepage from the lake itself and its ephemeral river channels. Isotopic data demonstrates that heavy rainfall exceeding the 60th percentile of monthly precipitation intensity drives the majority of the diffuse recharge, meaning that the projected intensification of tropical downpours under global warming actually favors groundwater replenishment within the basin. This extensive subsurface reservoir provides a critical hydrological buffer, ensuring permanent water access for municipal and agricultural pumping despite extreme surface-water variability.

== Ecology ==
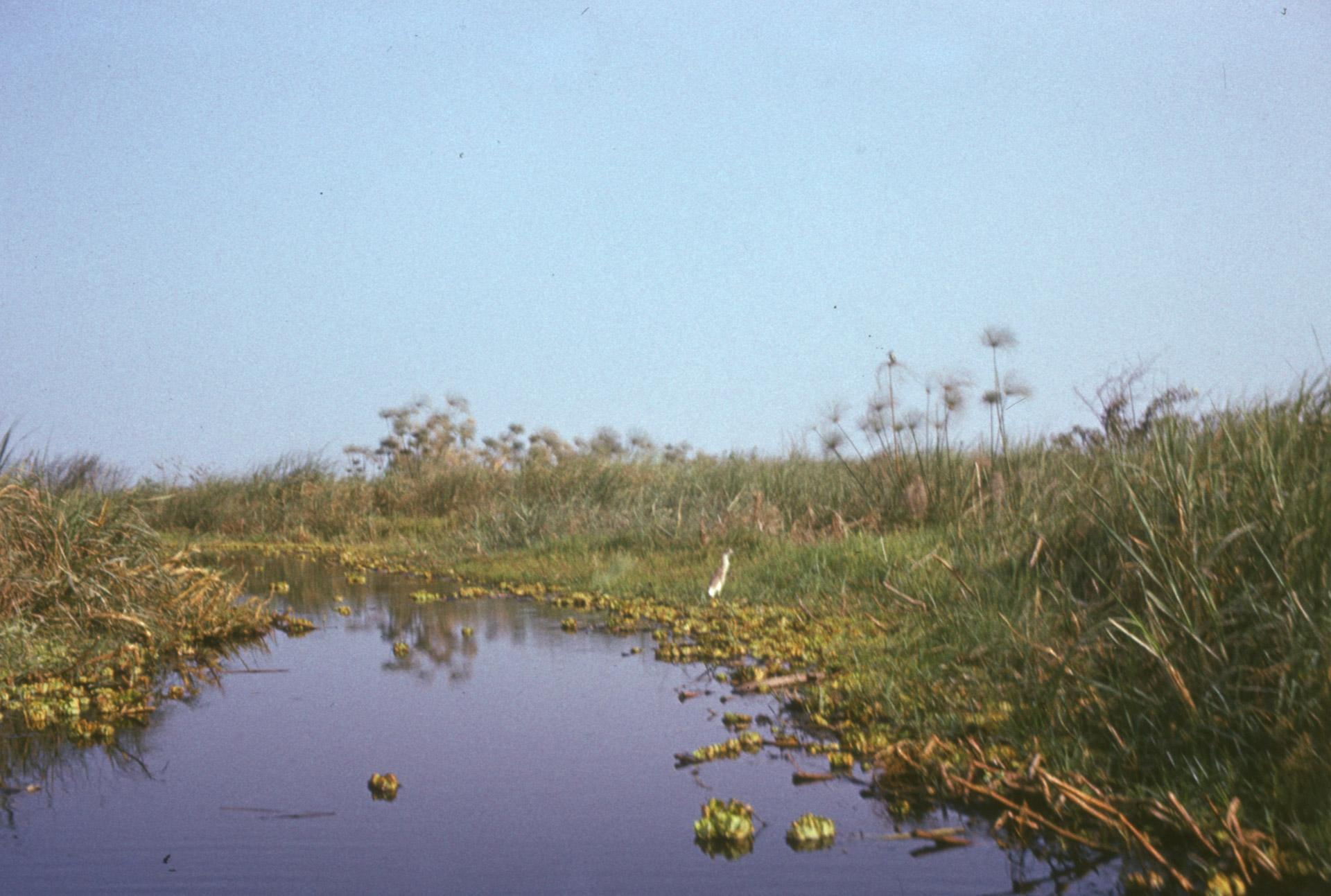
Lake Chad flooded savanna

Part of the Chad Basin is located within the Chad Basin National Park in Nigeria, and the country and Cameroon have established the Lake Chad Ramsar Wetland with a total area of 8,225 km^{2} (3,176 sq mi).

=== Plantlife ===
The wetland plants in the south mainly include cyperus papyrus, etc. Reeds mainly grow in the north where the salinity is high, and the floating plant pistia sometimes covers large areas of open water. Changing patterns of land use and progressive degradation have reduced diversity and resulted in a more open woodland increasingly composed of species adapted to reduced moisture. Plants such as hyparrhenia rufa grow on the shores of lakes with long floods in the south. The area of permanent vegetation has increased from about 3,800 km^{2} (1,500 sq mi) in 2000 to about 5,200 km^{2} (2,000 sq mi) in 2020 as water levels have dropped and temperatures have increased. The surrounding dense woodland has been converted to open forest with acacias, baobabs, palms and Indian jujube.

=== Birds ===
The lake has been designated an Important Bird Area (IBA) by BirdLife International. It is permanently or seasonally inhabited by hundreds of species of birds such as northern shoveler, Egyptian goose and marabou stork. It is an important wintering ground for European anatidae and wading birds. There are raptors such as steppe eagle and booted eagle on the lakeshore, and more than one million ruff can be observed on the lake at one time.

=== Mammals ===
The once common large mammals include red-fronted gazelle, dama gazelle, patas monkey, striped hyena, cheetah and caracal, while African elephant, otter, hippopotamus, sitatunga and kob are distributed in the wetlands. At present, most of the large mammals have been hunted to extinction, replaced by a large number of cattle.

=== Fish ===
The entire Chad Basin has 179 species of fish, of which 127 are the same as the Niger River Basin, 85 are the same as the Nile River Basin, 47 are the same as the Congo River Basin, and 84 fish species are distributed in the lake. This makes it a rich fishing ground for communities across Nigeria, Niger, Chad, and Cameroon. The seasonal influx of floods combined with seasonal increases in air temperature leads to decreased salinity, increased turbidity, and increased trophic levels, which catalyzed a surge in the number of phytoplankton and zooplankton, allowing large fish to migrate seasonally within the watershed to feed and breed in the fertile floodplain when floods arrive. The Chad basin remains an important fishery, with more than 40 species of commercial importance. Also noteworthy are such ancient species as the lungfish and sailfin

== Human activities ==
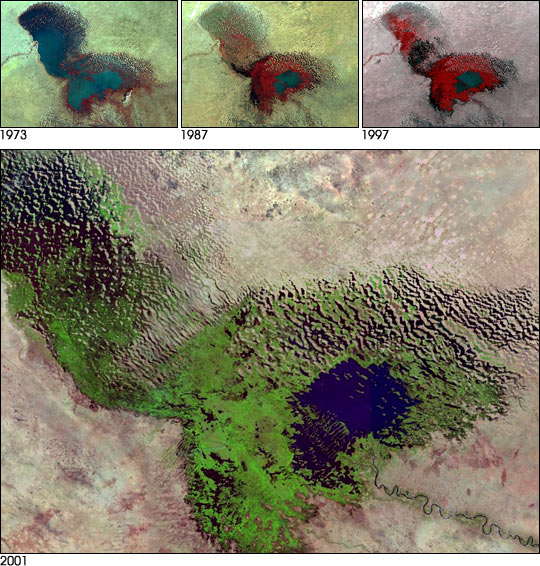
Lake Chad in a 2001 satellite image. The lake has shrunk by 95% since the 1960s.

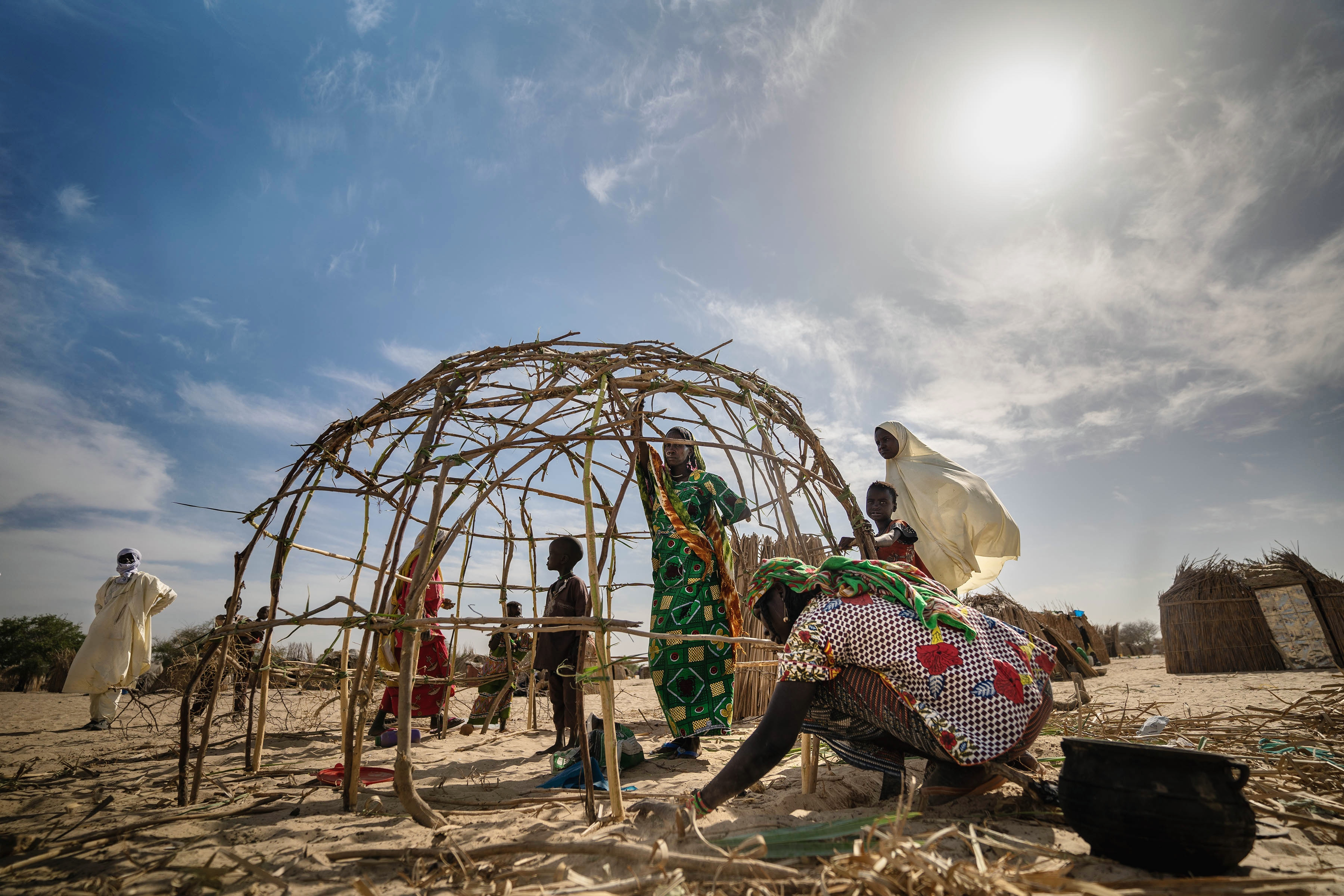
Building a temporary house in Lake Chad region

There are more than 30 million residents in the Chad Lake Basin. There are more than 70 ethnic groups around the lake, most of whom are distributed on the south bank, where the population density exceeds 100/km^{2} (260/sq mi). They rely on the water source of Chad Lake for irrigation, breeding, animal husbandry and drinking. Local self-sufficient crops include sorghum, maize, finger millet, beans, and vegetables. Gourd is widely planted for making utensils. The collection of forest products such as gum arabic, honey, beeswax, and firewood is of great significance in the region. However, the reduction in forest area has had a negative impact on the production of these products, and the explosive growth of cattle herds has exacerbated this impact. Cattle are the most important livestock raised, as well as poultry, goats, sheep, camels, horses, and donkeys. The animal husbandry was severely affected by the droughts of the 1970s and 1980s.

Fishing has traditionally been the most important economic activity for the people of the lake area, which almost ceased during drought periods and only resumed in the mid-1990s. Most fishing products are dried, pickled, or smoked. The natron produced in the depression on the northeast bank of the lake has long been of economic significance. Traditionally, it has been excavated in blocks and transported across the lake to enter the Nigerian market. Since the drought in the 1970s, the soil that can be planted without irrigation and fertilization has been exposed at the bottom of the lake, and it has been reclaimed as a polder for planting maize, cowpea, rice, sorghum and other crops. Farmers have shifted from planting mainly dry crops, such as wheat, to rice with high water demand, resulting in more serious soil salinization and water eutrophication. The adverse effects of reduced water sources on fishing, farming, and herding outweigh the benefits of new land from the receding waters. The surrounding residents who used to rely on lake water were forced to relocate, causing the economy of the lake area to continuously shrink.

Since 1970, five countries in the southern part of the basin have constructed numerous water conservancy projects in the upper reaches of the Chari River, Logone River, and Yobe River to intercept river water, resulting in a sharp decrease in the amount of water entering the lake. The average annual inflow of the Chari River and the Logone River from 1970 to 1990 was only 55% of that from 1950 to 1970. Since the 1980s, one-third of the water in the Chari River and the Logone River has been diverted and intercepted by the Central African Republic located upstream for agricultural irrigation and hydroelectric power generation. The dams built on the upper reaches of the rivers entering the lake changed the time and scope of seasonal floods and disrupted the migration of fish, resulting in a sharp reduction in the populations of Alestes baremoze and Nile perch, the main catches of Lake Chad, and a significant reduction in the catch. At the same time, the conflicts between countries and ethnic groups competing for water and land are also escalating. The four countries along the lake are all facing the problem of extreme poverty, and due to the difficulty in meeting their livelihoods, some local residents have been involved in drug and arms trade. This has been exacerbated by the activity of Boko Haram, an insurgency that has displaced millions of people and disrupted development through the region.

Cameroon, Niger, Nigeria, and Chad established the Lake Chad Basin Commission on 22 May 1964. The Central African Republic joined in 1996, and Libya joined in 2008. The headquarters of the committee is located in N'Djamena, Chad. The commission's tasks include managing Lake Chad and its water resources, protecting the ecosystem, and promoting regional integration, peace, security, and development in the Lake Chad region. The surrounding countries' water replenishment plan for Lake Chad includes the construction of a 2,400 km (1,500 mi) canal to transport 100×10^{9} m^{3} (130×10^{9} yd^{3}) of water from the Congo River Basin to the Chari River Basin every year, and use a series of dams along the route to generate electricity.

== See also ==
- Inner Niger Delta, an inland delta in Mali
- Lake Ptolemy, former lake in Sudan
- List of drying lakes
- Sudd, vast swamp in South Sudan
- Wildlife of Chad
- Lake Chad replenishment project – Proposed major water diversion scheme to prevent the drying up of Lake Chad
- Battle of Lake Chad
