= Kaboro =

- Location in Central African Republic
- Coordinates: 6°58′3″N 17°31′43″E
- Country: Central African Republic
- Prefecture: Ouham
- Sub-prefecture: Nana-Bakassa
- Commune: Nana-Bakassa

Population (2015)
  - Total: 2,917

Kaboro is a village situated in Ouham Prefecture, Central African Republic.

== History ==
An NGO group named ANEA rehabilitated pumps in Kaboro in June 2014 with assistance from UNICEF and Médecins Sans Frontières.

A bushfire occurred in Kaboro on 2 March 2015, annihilating 141 houses, many of which accommodated refugees from Mbali, Karoumba, Kamandiké, Katié, Kagomon, and Békondjo. Those villages were attacked by armed groups from 18 February to 1 March.

Ex-Seleka group attacked Kaboro in February 2016 and burned 300 houses, prompting Anti-balaka group led by Omega to launch a counterattack. An armed militia stormed Kaboro on 11 November 2016, killing two people.

== Education ==
Kaboro has one school.

== Healthcare ==
The village has one health post.

== Bibliography ==
- ACF (March 2015). Evaluation multisectorielle RRM Rapport Complet : Village de Kaboro, sous-préfecture de la Nana Bakassa, préfecture de l’Ouham, 11 mars 2015 (PDF) (Report).
