= Mbali Sigidi =

South African sports broadcaster

Mbali Sigidi is a South African sports broadcaster and MC.

== Early life and education ==
Mbali Sigidi completed her Bachelor of Arts degree in Media Studies and Sociology at Wits University. She later pursued an Honours degree in Brand Communications from the Vega School of Brand Leadership.

== Television career ==
Sigidi was the presenter and producer of the show Dlala Mzansi, alongside Vuyo Macoba and Malwandla Hlekane. She also worked as a sports journalist and sports news anchor at Soweto TV.

She then joined Supersport as a presenter for Gauteng Future Champions, Fanbase, PSL Weekly, DSTV Premiership, and the Phillys Games.

In 2022 she covered the Cosafa Seniors Men's Championship and the Women's Championship.

== Radio and digital career ==
At Visionview Sports Radio, she hosted "The Morning Run," a breakfast show.

In the digital space, Sigidi hosted the Women's National Basketball Association (WNBA) Show for NBA Africa called "Watching the W", providing analysis and coverage of the WNBA.

In May 2023 she was the MC for a girl's mini-netball day in Roodepoort.

== Awards and recognition ==
In 2019 Sigidi was nominated for sports journalist of the year. She was named one of the Mail and Guardian Top 200 Young Influential South Africans Under 35 years in sports, and she received the Video Media Best Newcomer award at the SAB Sports Media Awards.

Sigidi's show "Dlala Mzansi" was awarded Sports Programme of the Year and Community Media of the Year awards. Additionally, she received the Public Choice Award at the Gsport Awards in 2021.

In 2020 she was nominated for the Style Star award at the Gsport Awards.
