= Moyenne-Sido =

Locality in Ouham-Fafa, Central African Republic

- Location in Central African Republic
- Coordinates: 8°13′N 18°42′E
- Country: Central African Republic
- Prefecture: Ouham-Fafa
- Sub-prefecture: Sido
- Commune: Sido

Government
  - Sub-Prefect: Mahamat Sale Actar

Population (2003)
  - Total: 2,582

Moyenne-Sido is a locality in the prefecture of Ouham, in the Central African Republic.

== Geography and climate ==
The climate is a tropical savanna climate (Köppen climate classification Aw). The locality is located on the right bank of the Grande Sido River, which constitutes the border with the Republic of Chad, opposite the Chadian city of Sido or Nadili. It is crossed by the RN4 national road, which links Kabo (61 km to the south), then Damara , and beyond Bangui into Chad.

== History ==
The city fell to the Seleka on March 1, 2013. It was recaptured by government forces on 19 April 2021.

CPC rebels captured Moyenne-Sido on 2 November 2023 after clashing with FACA. Later, they withdrew from the town. CPC attacked Sido on 24 November 2023, and FACA soldiers fled to Kaga-Bandoro, causing many of the residents to flee from the town Later, the government forces and Wagner Group recaptured the town.
