= Mbrès =

- Sub-prefecture and town
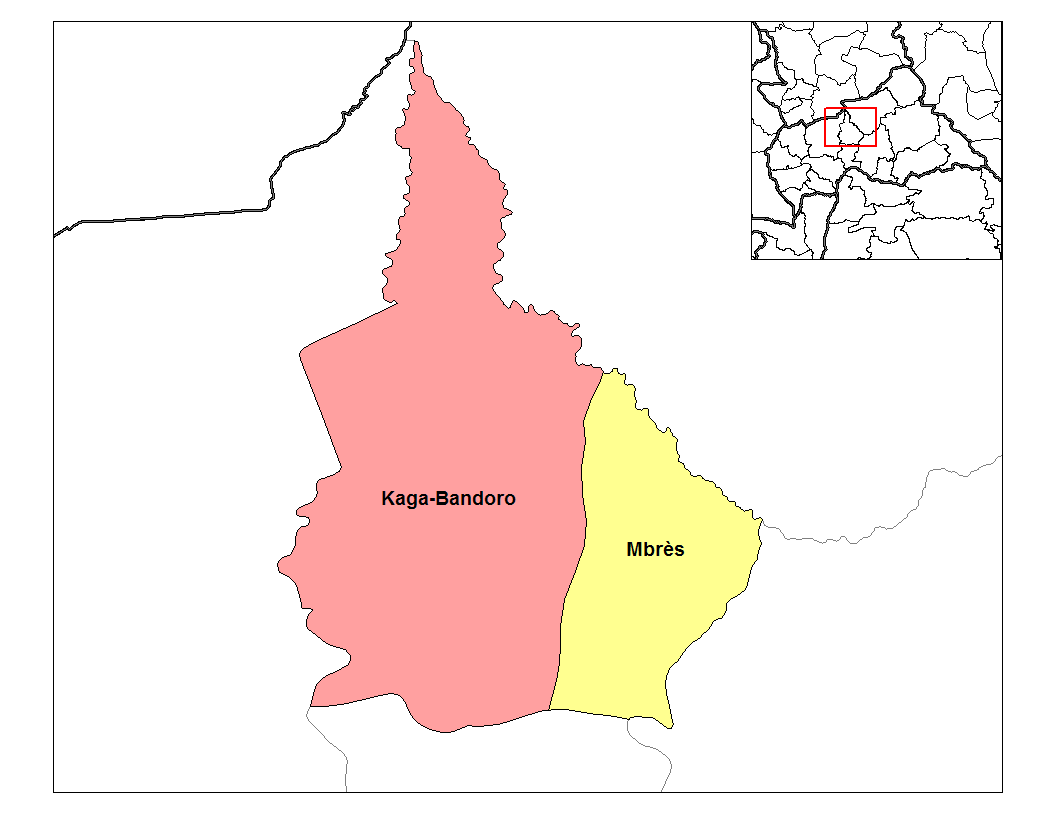
- Sub-prefectures of Nana-Grébizi

- Location in the Central African Republic
- Coordinates: 6°40′N 19°48′E
- Country: Central African Republic
- Prefecture: Nana-Grébizi

Government
  - Sub-Prefect: Yves Mbetigaza
- Time zone: UTC+1 (WAT)

Mbrès is a sub-prefecture and town in the Nana-Grébizi Prefecture of the northern Central African Republic.

== History ==
On 8 June 2016 four armed groups including Anti-balaka, UPC, FPRC and MPC signed pact of non-aggression in Mbrès. On 28 March 2021 the town was captured by Russian mercenaries. They withdrew day later allowing rebels to return. Russian forces returned to Mbrès on 9 April and withdrew again on 12 April.
