= Bouca =

- Location in Central African Republic
- Coordinates: 6°30′N 18°17′E
- Country: Central African Republic
- Prefecture: Ouham-Fafa

Government
  - Sub-Prefect: Achille Paulin Kouzouhoro

Population (2003)
  - Total: 12,280

Bouca is a town located in the Central African Republic prefecture of Ouham-Fafa. It is not far east of Bossangoa at the Fafa river.

== History ==
On 21 March 2013, the town was overtaken by rebels of the Séléka coalition. On 9 September 2013 armed Anti-balaka fighters attacked the town killing at least three people. On 4 March 2021 Bouca was recaptured by government forces.

== Climate ==
Köppen-Geiger climate classification system classifies its climate as tropical wet and dry (Aw).

Climate data for Bouca
Month	Jan	Feb	Mar	Apr	May	Jun	Jul	Aug	Sep	Oct	Nov	Dec	Year
Mean daily maximum °C (°F)	37.3 (99.1)	39.9 (103.8)	38.2 (100.8)	38 (100)	36.1 (97.0)	33.4 (92.1)	32.7 (90.9)	32.5 (90.5)	32.6 (90.7)	33.6 (92.5)	34.6 (94.3)	35.5 (95.9)	35.4 (95.6)
Daily mean °C (°F)	24 (75)	26.9 (80.4)	28 (82)	28.8 (83.8)	27.9 (82.2)	26 (79)	25.9 (78.6)	25.4 (77.7)	25.4 (77.7)	25.9 (78.6)	25 (77)	24 (75)	26.1 (78.9)
Mean daily minimum °C (°F)	10.7 (51.3)	14 (57)	17.8 (64.0)	19.7 (67.5)	19.7 (67.5)	18.6 (65.5)	19.2 (66.6)	18.4 (65.1)	18.3 (64.9)	18.3 (64.9)	15.4 (59.7)	12.5 (54.5)	16.9 (62.4)
Average precipitation mm (inches)	0 (0)	9 (0.4)	48 (1.9)	99 (3.9)	132 (5.2)	162 (6.4)	232 (9.1)	233 (9.2)	224 (8.8)	184 (7.2)	28 (1.1)	2 (0.1)	1,353 (53.3)
Source: Climate-Data.org, altitude: 4361

== See also ==
- List of cities in the Central African Republic
- Prefectures of the Central African Republic
- Lake Chad replenishment project
- Waterway
