= Central African Patriotic Movement =

Central African Republic rebel group

- Mouvement patriotique pour la Centrafrique
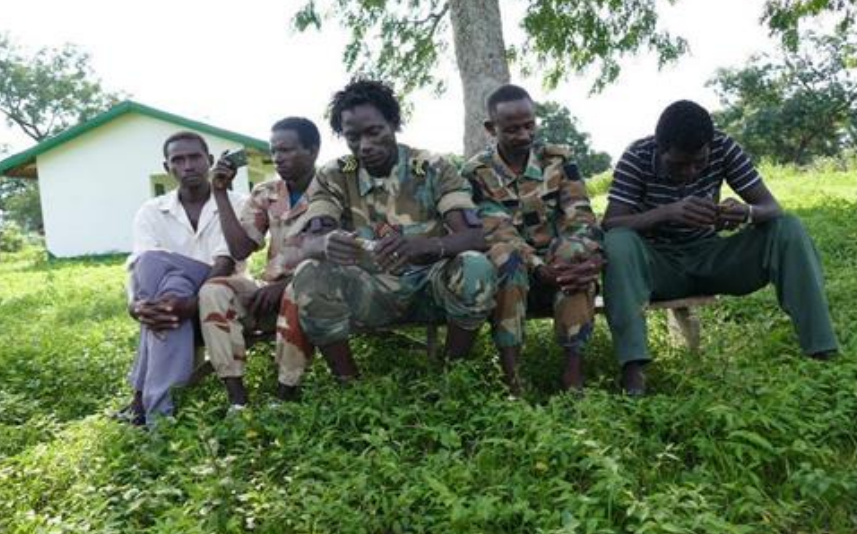
- MPC fighters in Beboye, 2016
- Leaders: Mahamat al-Khatim; Idriss Ahmed El-Bachar
- Dates active: July 2015–
- Split from: Séléka
- Headquarters: Kaga-Bandoro (until 2021); Kabo (until 2021); Moyenne-Sido (until 2021); N'Djamena, Chad (since 2021)
- Active regions: Central African Republic: Nana-Grébizi prefecture; Ouham prefecture; Bamingui-Bangoran prefecture
- Ideology: Revolutionary nationalism
- Status: Active
- Part of: Coalition of Patriots for Change (2020–2023)
- Wars: Central African Republic Civil War (2012–present)

Territories under control of MPC

Central African Patriotic Movement (MPC, French: Mouvement patriotique pour la Centrafrique) is a rebel group in the Central African Republic based in the northwestern part of the country.

== History ==
MPC was formed in July 2015 by Mahamat Al-Khatim. In October 2016, they were accused in taking part in attack which killed 37 civilians, however Al-Khatim denied these claims. In May 2018, MNLC leader, Ahmat Bahar announced that his group was merging with MPC. On 17 December 2020, MPC joined Coalition of Patriots for Change.
