= Kabo =

Town in the Central African Republic

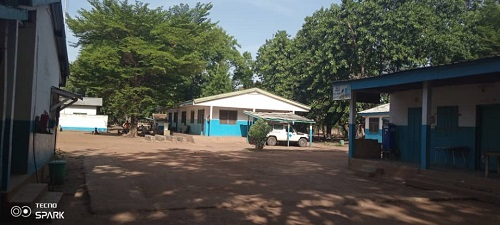
- Kabo hospital in 2023

- Location in Central African Republic
- Coordinates: 7°41′58″N 18°37′45″E
- Country: Central African Republic
- Prefecture: Ouham-Fafa

Government
  - Sub-Prefect: Maxime Mbainani
  - Mayor: Abdel Hakkis Mahamat
- Elevation: 1,381 ft (421 m)

Population (2003)
  - Total: 16,279

Kabo is a town in the northern Central African Republic, lying north west of Kaga Bandoro. It is a market town and the border post for Chad.

== History ==
The northern nomads in the Central African Republic resented the central government and a rebel People's Army for the Restoration of the Republic and Democracy (PAPRD) was formed in the 1990s. Clashes between the rebels and the central government intensified, and many people from Kabo and the surrounding area fled as refugees to Chad. However, in January 2008, PAPRD and the Central African Armed Forces (FACA) agreed on a ceasefire for the Kabo area, allowing many of the refugees to return.

=== Central African Republic Civil War (2012-present) ===
On 19 December 2012 the city was captured by Séléka coalition. As of 2020 it was under control of ex-Séléka Central African Patriotic Movement. On 15 April 2021 Kabo was recaptured by government forces.

CPC attacked Kabo on 31 May 2023. FACA and Wagner repelled the attack. UPC attacked FACA bases in Kabo on 8 January 2024. Several soldiers and a civilian were killed.
