= Batangafo =

- Location in Central African Republic
- Coordinates: 7°18′N 18°18′E
- Country: Central African Republic
- Prefecture: Ouham-Fafa

Government
  - Sub-Prefect: Achille Fayanga

Population (2003)
  - Total: 16,420

Batangafo is a town located in the Central African Republic prefecture of Ouham-Fafa at the confluence of Ouham River and its affluent Fafa.

== History ==
FDPC militias attacked Batangafo on 20 February 2009. They looted weapons and ammunition from the gendarmerie post and food from the aid agency warehouse.

In August 2014 heavy clashes erupted in Batangafo between Séléka and Sangaris forces resulting in more than 50 deaths. On 31 October 2018 heavy clashes broke out between Anti-balaka and ex-Séléka fighters in Batangafo resulting in at least 15 deaths The town was recaptured by government forces on 12 April 2021.

In December 2020, Batangafo became the capital of Ouham-Fafa Prefecture.

== Transport ==
There is an airport in Bafangafo.

== See also ==
- Lake Chad replenishment project
- Waterway
