= Kaga-Bandoro =

Place in the Central African Republic

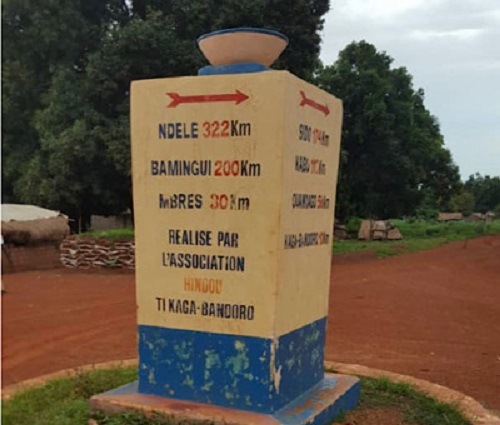

- Location in Central African Republic
- Coordinates: 7°0′N 19°11′E
- Country: Central African Republic
- Prefecture: Nana-Grébizi

Government
  - Sub-Prefect: Jean Marie Maleyombo

Area
  - Total: 67 km^{2} (26 sq mi)
- Elevation: 403 m (1,322 ft)

Population (2012)
  - Total: 27,797
  - Density: 410/km^{2} (1,100/sq mi)

Kaga-Bandoro (formerly Fort-Crampel and Crampel) is a market town and capital of the Nana-Grébizi prefecture of the Central African Republic. It represents the seat of the Roman Catholic Diocese of Kaga–Bandoro. The town has been renamed twice.

== History ==
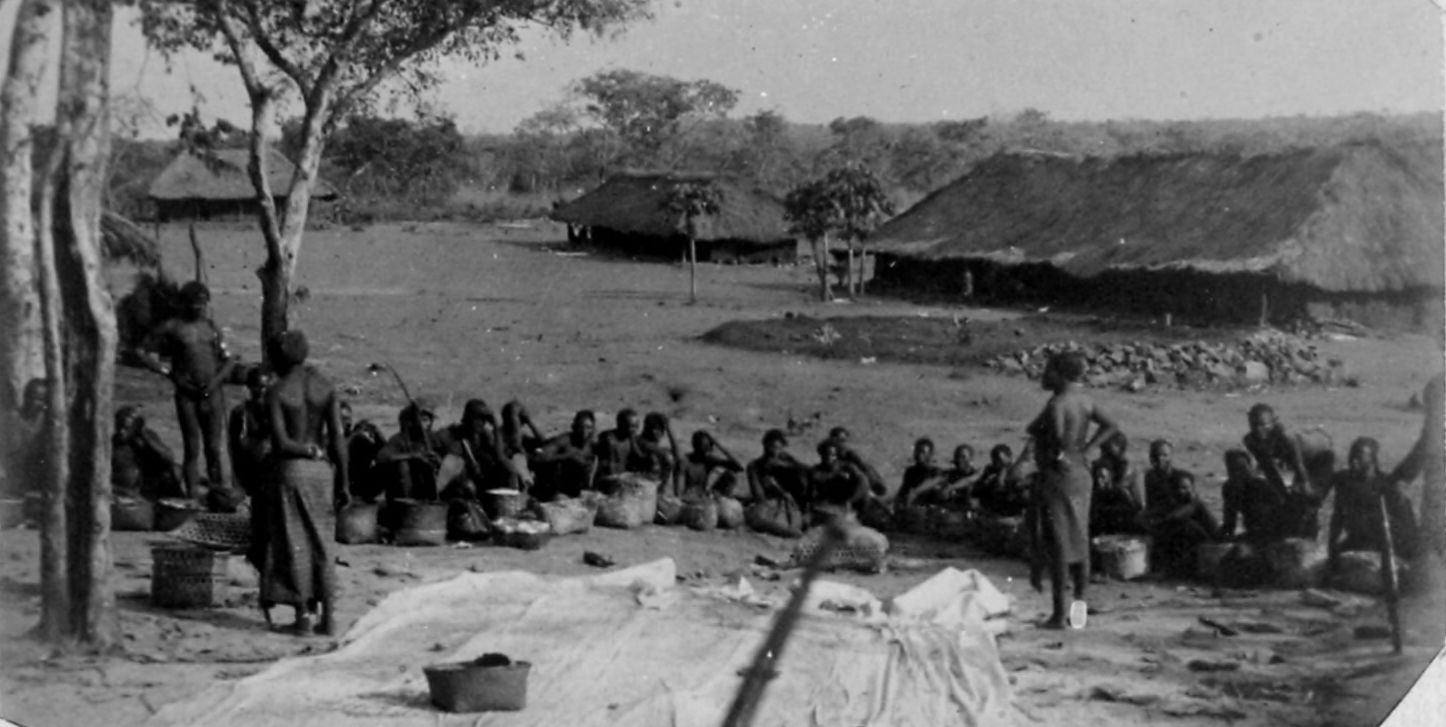
Fort-Crampel Market, 1900

In March 1897, Émile Gentil established a post in what is known as Kaga-Bandoro. On the next year, the post was named Fort-Crampel. Two French colonial officials executed a deserter by dynamite on 14 July 1903 to celebrate Bastille Day and warn the locals not to rebel against the colonial government. This egregious incident led to the scandal known as Fort Crampel Affair.

On 23 January 1961, Fort-Crampel was renamed to Crampel. Thirteen years later, Crampel was renamed to Kaga-Bandoro on 6 August 1974.

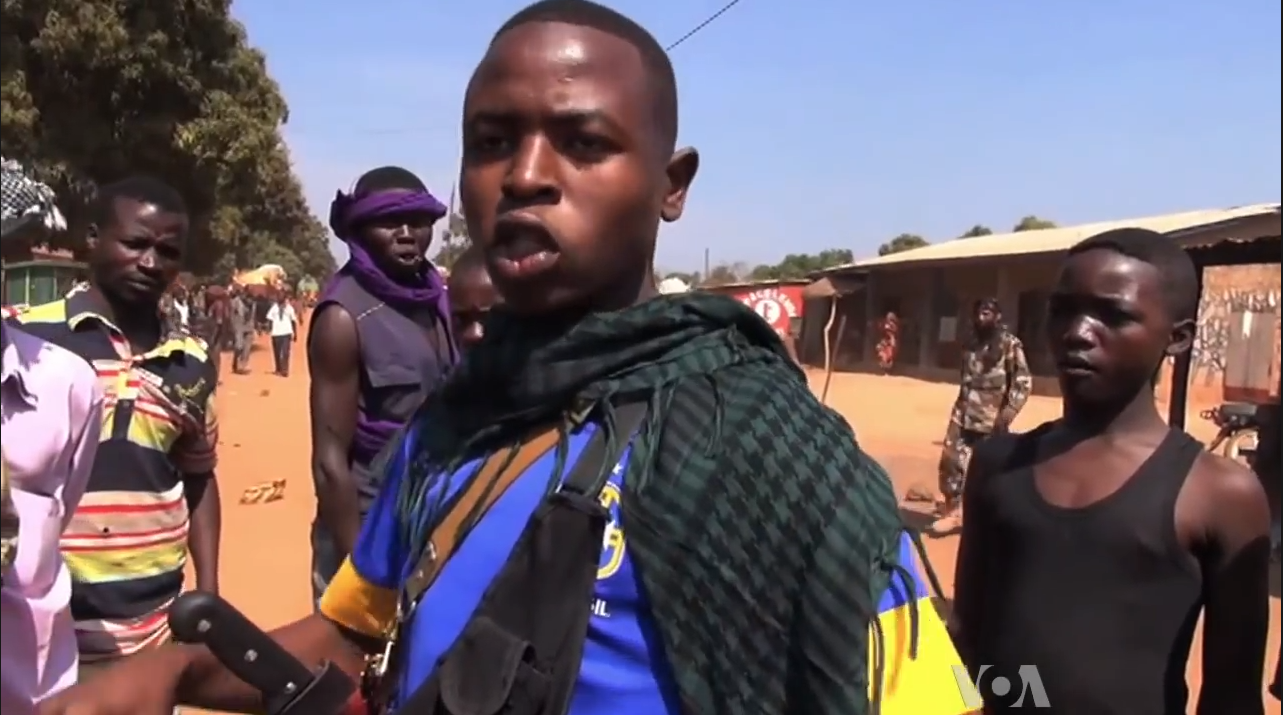
Séléka fighter in Kaga-Bandoro, 2014

On 25 December 2012 rebels from Séléka coalition took control of Kaga-Bandoro. On 14 December 2015 rebels announced independence of Republic of Logone in Kaga-Bandoro. In September 2016 Kaga-Bandoro was reported to be under joint control of MPC and FPRC armed groups. In December 2019 four armed groups were reportedly present in Kaga-Bandoro: MPC, FPRC, Anti-balaka and UPC.

On 10 April 2021, the FACA and their Russian allies entered the city of Kaga-Bandoro. This has caused the fleeing of the rebel forces previously occupying the town to the north towards Kabo and Batangafo.

== Climate ==
Köppen-Geiger climate classification system classifies its climate as tropical wet and dry (Aw).

Climate data for Kaga-Bandoro
Month	Jan	Feb	Mar	Apr	May	Jun	Jul	Aug	Sep	Oct	Nov	Dec	Year
Mean daily maximum °C (°F)	32.2 (90.0)	33.9 (93.0)	34 (93)	32.8 (91.0)	32 (90)	30.5 (86.9)	30.1 (86.2)	31.8 (89.2)	30.9 (87.6)	31.9 (89.4)	31.3 (88.3)	31.2 (88.2)	31.9 (89.4)
Daily mean °C (°F)	21 (70)	23 (73)	24.9 (76.8)	25 (77)	25 (77)	24.1 (75.4)	24.4 (75.9)	25.8 (78.4)	24.6 (76.3)	25.1 (77.2)	22.3 (72.1)	20.8 (69.4)	23.8 (74.9)
Mean daily minimum °C (°F)	9.9 (49.8)	12.1 (53.8)	15.9 (60.6)	17.3 (63.1)	18 (64)	17.8 (64.0)	18.7 (65.7)	19.8 (67.6)	18.4 (65.1)	18.3 (64.9)	13.4 (56.1)	10.5 (50.9)	15.8 (60.5)
Average precipitation mm (inches)	2 (0.1)	7 (0.3)	38 (1.5)	61 (2.4)	132 (5.2)	157 (6.2)	224 (8.8)	242 (9.5)	246 (9.7)	167 (6.6)	19 (0.7)	2 (0.1)	1,297 (51.1)
Source: Climate-Data.org, altitude: 425m

== See also ==
- List of cities in the Central African Republic
- Prefectures of the Central African Republic
