= Ouham-Fafa =

Prefecture of the Central African Republic

- Prefecture
- Ouham-Fafa in the Central African Republic
- Country: Central African Republic
- Capital: Batangafo

Government
  - Prefect: Henri Ngate

Area
  - Total: 32,530 km^{2} (12,560 sq mi)

Population (2024 estimation)
  - Total: 239,157
  - Density: 7.352/km^{2} (19.04/sq mi)

Ouham-Fafa is a prefecture in Central African Republic. With an area of 32,530 km², the prefecture had a population of 239,157 inhabitants in 2024. Batangafo is the capital of Ouham-Fafa.

== History ==
Previously all of its territory was part of Ouham Prefecture. Ouham-Fafa was founded on 10 December 2020 under administrative reforms.

== Administration ==
Ouham-Fafa is divided into 4 sub-prefectures and 11 communes.

Sub Prefecture	Commune	Population (2022 estimation)
Batangafo	Batangafo	24 119
Batangafo	Bédé	31 567
Batangafo	Hama	7 005
Batangafo	Ouassi	15 065
Batangafo	Bakassa	10 651
Bouca	Bouca-Bobo	30 153
Bouca	Ladi-Gbawi	26 048
Bouca	Ouham-Fafa	7 627
Bouca	Fafa-Boungou	16 703
Kabo	Ouaki	16 064
Sido	Sido	40 477
