= Nana-Grébizi =

Prefecture of the Central African Republic

Coordinates: 7°05′N 19°15′E

- Prefecture
- Nana-Grébizi in the Central African Republic

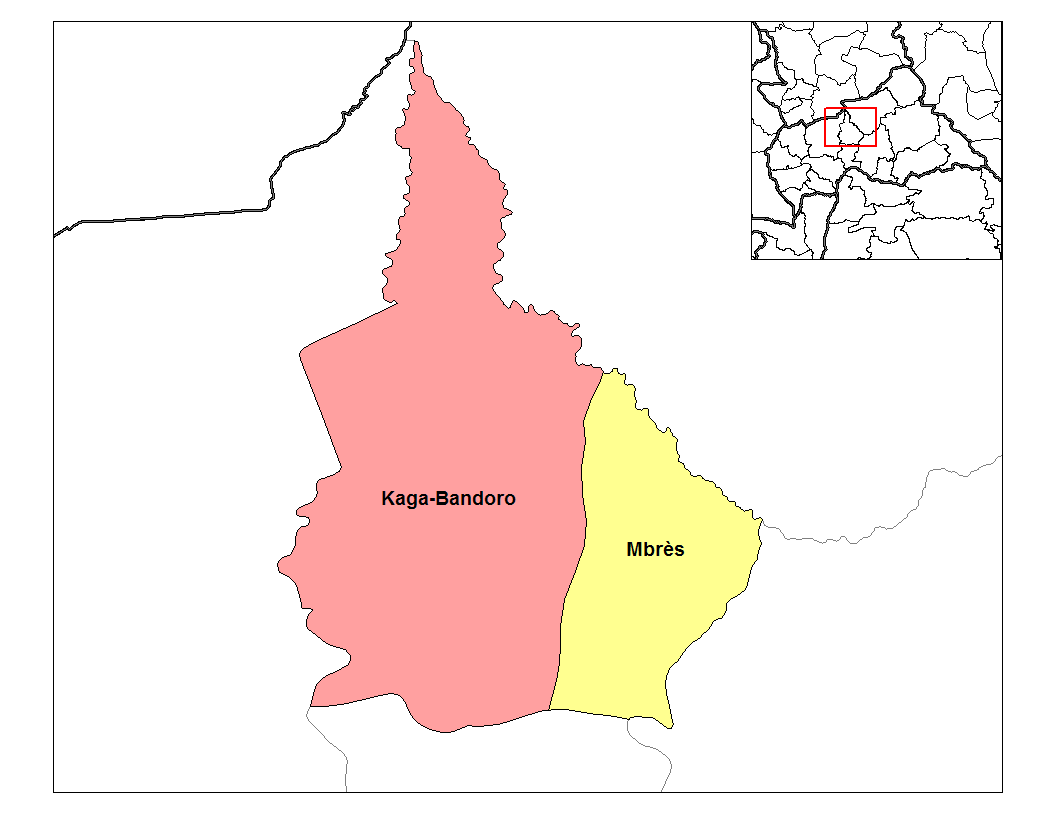
- Sub-prefectures of Nana-Grébizi
- Country: Central African Republic
- Capital: Kaga-Bandoro

Government
  - Prefect: Honoré Pierre Dangoua Nino

Area
  - Total: 19,996 km^{2} (7,720 sq mi)

Population (2003 census)
  - Total: 117,816
  - Estimate (2024 estimation): 232,205

Nana-Grébizi is one of the 20 prefectures of the Central African Republic. It covers an area of 19,996 km^{2} and has a population of 117,816 (2003 census). The capital is Kaga Bandoro. In 2024, official estimates suggest the population reached 232,205 inhabitants.

== Sub-prefectures ==
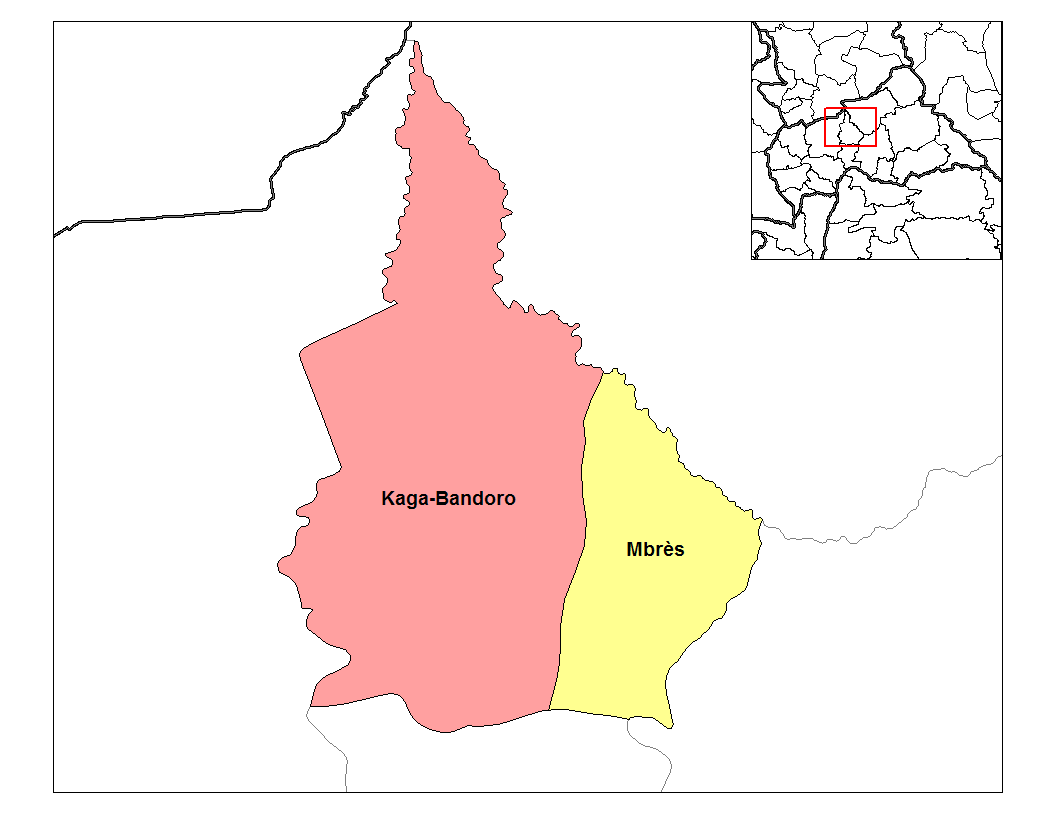
Sub-prefectures of Nana-Grebizi

- Kaga-Bandoro
- Mbrès
