= Soundtrack to a Coup d'Etat =

2024 documentary film by Johan Grimonprez

- Film poster
- Directed by: Johan Grimonprez
- Written by: Johan Grimonprez
- Produced by: Daan Milius; Rémi Grellety
- Narrated by: In Koli Jean Bofane; Zap Mama; Patrick Cruise O'Brien
- Cinematography: Jonathan Wannyn
- Edited by: Rik Chaubet
- Production companies: Onomatopee Films; Warboys Films; Zap-O-Matik; Baldr Film; ZKM Center; RTBF; VRT
- Release date: 22 January 2024 (Sundance)
- Running time: 150 minutes
- Countries: Belgium; France; Netherlands
- Languages: French; English; Russian
- Box office: $434,267

Soundtrack to a Coup d'Etat is a 2024 documentary film directed by Johan Grimonprez about the Cold War episode that led American musicians Abbey Lincoln and Max Roach to crash the UN Security Council in protest against the murder of Congolese leader Patrice Lumumba. It features excerpts from My Country, Africa by Andrée Blouin, Congo Inc. by In Koli Jean Bofane, To Katanga and Back by Conor Cruise O'Brien, and audio memoirs by Nikita Khrushchev.

The film had its world premiere at the 2024 Sundance Film Festival on January 22. It won the André Cavens Award for Best Film from the Belgian Film Critics Association. At the 97th Academy Awards, it was nominated for Best Documentary Feature Film. The film has also won Best Art Film at the Rose d'Or awards in 2025.

Soundtrack to a Coup d'Etat has been featured in multiple lists of Best of 2024 and 2025 and was considered the third best documentary of all time by Harper's Bazaar.

== Plot ==
One February morning in 1961, singer Abbey Lincoln and drummer Max Roach protested at the UN Security Council after the murder of Patrice Lumumba, prime minister of the newly independent Congo. Sixty yelling protesters throw punches, slam their stilettos, and provoke a skirmish with unprepared guards as diplomats look on in shock.

Six months earlier, sixteen newly independent African countries are admitted to the United Nations, shifting the majority vote away from the old colonial powers. Soviet leader Nikita Khrushchev speaks in opposition to the neo-colonial power grab unfolding in the Republic of the Congo (Léopoldville) (modern DR Congo). Denouncing America's color bar and UN complicity in the overthrow of Lumumba, he demands immediate decolonization worldwide.

To retain control over the riches of what used to be the Belgian Congo, King Baudouin of Belgium finds an ally in the Eisenhower administration, which fears losing access to one of the world's biggest known reserves of uranium, a metal vital for the creation of atomic bombs. Congo-Léopoldville takes center stage to both the Cold War and the scheme for control of the UN. The U.S. State Department swings into action: jazz ambassador Louis Armstrong is dispatched to win the hearts and minds of Africa. Unwittingly, Armstrong becomes a smokescreen to divert attention from Africa's first post-colonial coup, leading to the assassination of Congo's first democratically elected leader. Malcolm X stands up in open support of Lumumba and his efforts to create a United States of Africa while also reframing the freedom struggle of African Americans as one not for civil rights, but for human rights, aiming to bring his case before the UN.

As Black jazz ambassadors are performing unaware amidst covert CIA operatives, the likes of Armstrong, Nina Simone, Duke Ellington, Dizzy Gillespie, and Melba Liston face a painful dilemma: how to represent a country where segregation is still the law of the land.

Jazz and decolonization are entwined in this episode of the Cold War, where musicians stepped onto the political stage, and politicians lent their voices as inadvertent lead singers. This story of the undermining of African self-determination is told from the perspective of Central African Republic women's rights activist and politician Andrée Blouin, Irish diplomat Conor Cruise O'Brien, Belgian-Congolese writer In Koli Jean Bofane, and Nikita Khrushchev.

== Cast ==
- Louis Armstrong, jazz musician
- Dizzy Gillespie, jazz musician
- Abbey Lincoln, jazz musician
- Max Roach, jazz musician
- Nina Simone, jazz musician
- Miriam Makeba, jazz musician
- Thelonious Monk, jazz musician
- John Coltrane, jazz musician
- Duke Ellington, jazz musician
- Melba Liston, jazz musician
- Eric Dolphy, jazz musician
- Charles Mingus, jazz musician
- Ornette Coleman, jazz musician
- Le Grand Kallé, African Rumba musician
- Rock-a-Mambo, African Rumba Orchestra
- Dr. Nico, African Rumba musician
- Marie Daulne "Zap Mama", Belgian-Congolese musician
- Patrice Lumumba, Congolese Prime Minister
- Eddy Wally, Belgian musician
- Willis Connover, Voice of America radio broadcaster
- René Magritte, Belgian painter
- Andrée Blouin, Pan-Africanist
- Dag Hammarskjöld, UN Secretary-General
- Nikita Khrushchev, Soviet Chairman (1958–1964)
- In Koli Jean Bofane, novelist
- Malcolm X, human rights activist
- Conor Cruise O'Brien, Irish diplomat/writer
- Allen Dulles, Director of the CIA (1953 - 1961)
- John F. Dulles, U.S. Secretary of State (1953 - 1959)

== Production ==
One of Johan Grimonprez inspirations for making the film was his fascination with Nikita Khrushchev's shoe-banging incident. The film, made entirely with archival footage, was edited using Adobe Premiere Pro and was color corrected with DaVinci Resolve.

== Release and reception ==
The film premiered at the 2024 Sundance Film Festival as part of the World Documentary Competition where it received the Special Jury Award for Cinematic Innovation. The jury described the film as "a bold and ambitious way to grapple with a complex story. It bursts into our consciousness using multiple storytelling forms, taking a concealed history and making us see it differently."

=== Reception ===
On the review aggregator website Rotten Tomatoes, 97% of 62 critics' reviews are positive. The website's consensus reads: "Director Johan Grimonprez's sprawling documentary moves to a furious beat, laying out its thesis with an energy that's as enthralling as it is thought-provoking." Metacritic, which uses a weighted average, assigned the film a score of 91 out of 100, based on 19 critics, indicating "universal acclaim".

Shortly after the premiere of the film at Sundance, it was championed by critic Alissa Wilkinson of The New York Times, who wrote "I can't stop thinking about the remarkable 'Soundtrack to a Coup d'Etat,' a sprawling film that's a well-researched essay about the 1960 regime change in the Democratic Republic of Congo and the part the United States, particularly the C.I.A., played." She later described the film as "marvelous". Wilkinson ranked the film fourth in her list of the Top Ten Best Films of 2024, writing that it was "both a multimedia dissertation and a dizzying accomplishment".

The film was nominated for Best Documentary Feature Film at the 97th Academy Awards.

The critic Murtada Elfadl published on Variety: "an invigorating piece of documentary filmmaking [...] It's dense yet nuanced, managing to capture so many disparate threads that combined to result in Lumumba's murder."

Marya E. Gates wrote on RogerEbert.com: "A searing video-essay… Watching the doc evokes the same intellectual and visceral feeling one gets from reading a dense work of nonfiction…For many it will be an eye-opener."

David Opie for IndieWire: "A vibrant film essay that marries jazz and politics… Grimonprez's doc has an impressionistic flair that asks audiences to actively participate in piecing everything together... It's a stirring rally that's uniquely cinematic in the way so many elements come together so precisely and yet still feels so organic as well."

Lovia Gyarkye for The Hollywood Reporter: "Soundtrack to a Coup D'Etat plays like a syncopated thriller."

The film has been picked as one of the "10 Best Movies From the 2024 Sundance Film Festival" by Rolling Stone. It also has been shown at MoMA's Director's Fortnight and at the 2024 edition of Cinéma du Réel.

Soundtrack to a Coup d'Etat was nominated for the Gotham Awards, the Critics Choice Doc Awards, Cinema Eye Honors, European Film Awards, IDA Doc Awards, and the Film Independent Spirit Awards in the Best Documentary category.

Screen Daily ranked Soundtrack to a Coup d'Etat as the best film of 2024. It was also ranked second in the film category of the Best of 2024 list from Artforum.

The film was included in a New York Times list of ideal nominees for the 97th Academy Awards.

In June 2025, IndieWire ranked the film at number 71 on its list of "The 100 Best Movies of the 2020s (So Far)."

In December 2025, Morgan Bassichis in an interview for Vulture had Soundtrack to a Coup d'Etat as one of his favorite movies of the year. Declaring that: "[F]eels like one of the most important films I've ever seen [...] and I hope it becomes core curriculum in every discipline, forever."

The film has been included in the 'Best video essays of 2025' list by British film magazine Sight & Sound. Writer and curator Enrico Camporesi described the film as: "A reused footage fresco on the geopolitical (and musical) context that led to the assassination of Patrice Lumumba in 1961."

The film is featured as the best music documentary of 2025 on a list made by the journalist Sam Richards for Uncut Magazine. He writes: "The best film you'll ever see about the Congo, the CIA and jazz."

The filmmaker Caveh Zahedi listed Soundtrack to a Coup d'Etat as one of the ten best films of the twenty-first century.

=== Accolades ===
Award	Date of ceremony	Category	Recipient(s)	Result	Ref.
Sundance Film Festival	28 January 2024	World Cinema Documentary Grand Jury Prize	Soundtrack to a Coup d'Etat	Nominated	
Sundance Film Festival	28 January 2024	Special Jury Award for Cinematic Innovation	Soundtrack to a Coup d'Etat	Won	
Sofia International Film Festival	31 March 2024	Grand Prix – International Documentary Competition	Soundtrack to a Coup d'Etat	Won	
San Francisco International Film Festival	28 April 2024	Persistence of Vision	Soundtrack to a Coup d'Etat	Won	
Bergen International Film Festival	16 October 2024	Documentary Extraordinaire (Best documentary)	Soundtrack to a Coup d'Etat	Won	
El Gouna	27 October 2024	Silver Star for Documentary Film	Soundtrack to a Coup d'Etat	Won	
Montclair Film Festival	28 October 2024	Bruce Sinofsky Award for the Documentary Feature Competition	Soundtrack to a Coup d'Etat	Won	
Thessaloniki Film Festival	10 November 2024	Golden Alexander	Soundtrack to a Coup d'Etat	Nominated	
Thessaloniki Film Festival	10 November 2024	Audience Award	Soundtrack to a Coup d'Etat	Won	
Mirage Film Festival	3 November	Best Editing	Rik Chaubet	Won	
Gotham Awards	2 December 2024	Best Documentary Feature	Johan Grimonprez, Rémi Grellety, Daan Milius	Nominated	
International Documentary Association Awards	5 December 2024	Best Feature Documentary	Johan Grimonprez, Rémi Grellety, Daan Milius	Nominated	
International Documentary Association Awards	5 December 2024	Best Director	Johan Grimonprez	Nominated	
International Documentary Association Awards	5 December 2024	Best Writing	Johan Grimonprez	Won	
International Documentary Association Awards	5 December 2024	ABC News Videosource Award	Soundtrack to a Coup d'Etat	Won	
International Documentary Association Awards	5 December 2024	Best Editing	Rik Chaubet	Won	
European Film Awards	7 December 2024	European Film	Soundtrack to a Coup d'Etat	Shortlisted	
European Film Awards	7 December 2024	European Documentary	Soundtrack to a Coup d'Etat	Nominated	
Toronto Film Critics Association	15 December 2024	Best Documentary Film	Soundtrack to a Coup d'Etat	Runner-up	
Belgian Film Critics Association	19 December 2024	Best Film	Soundtrack to a Coup d'Etat	Won	
Florida Film Critics Circle	20 December 2024	Best Documentary Film	Soundtrack to a Coup d'Etat	Won	
Cinema Eye Honors	9 January 2025	Outstanding Non-Fiction Feature	Johan Grimonprez, Daan Milius, Rémi Grellety, Jonathan Wannyn, Rik Chaubet, Ranko Pauković and Alek Bunic Goosse	Nominated	
Cinema Eye Honors	9 January 2025	Outstanding Editing	Rik Chaubet	Won	
Cinema Eye Honors	9 January 2025	Outstanding Sound Design	Ranko Pauković and Alek Bunic Goosse	Won	
Directors Guild of America Awards	8 February 2025	Outstanding Directorial Achievement in Documentaries	Johan Grimonprez	Nominated	
Cinema for Peace Award	18 February 2025	Most Valuable Documentary of the Year	Soundtrack to a Coup d'Etat	Won	
Pan African Film & Arts Festival	20 February 2025	Ja'net Dubois Award for Feature Documentary	Johan Grimonprez	Won	
Independent Spirit Awards	22 February 2025	Best Documentary Feature	Johan Grimonprez, Rémi Grellety, Daan Milius	Nominated	
Academy Awards	2 March 2025	Best Documentary Feature Film	Johan Grimonprez, Rémi Grellety, Daan Milius	Nominated	
Festival Cinéma Méditerranéen de Tétouan	1 November 2025	Prix Mohamed Reggab – Prix spécial du jury	Soundtrack to a Coup d'Etat	Won	
Rose d'Or Awards	1 December 2025	Best Art Film	Onomatopee Films & Warboys Films, Mediawan, VRT Canvas	Won	
René Awards	7 March 2026	Best Documentary Film	Onomatopee Films & Warboys Films, Mediawan, VRT Canvas	Won	

== Distribution ==
Kino Lorber picked up Soundtrack to a Coup d'Etat from Submarine Entertainment at the Cannes film market. Wendy Lidell, the Lorber senior vice president, negotiated the deal with Matt Burke of Submarine. Mediawan Rights is handling international sales for the film and has already inked multiple territories including Australia (Madman), Benelux (Imagine), Brazil (Bela Artes Grupo), Greece (Cinobo), Italy (I Wonder Pictures), Spain (Filmin), Thailand (Documentary Club), UK/Ireland (Modern Films), and ex-Yugoslavia (Beldocs).

Kino Lorber partnered with specialist streamer Kanopy on the U.S. release of the film.

== See also ==
- Kobarweng or Where Is Your Helicopter?
- MONUSCO
- Non-aligned Movement
- Reform of the United Nations Security Council
- Democratic Republic of the Congo–Rwanda tensions (2022–present)
- South Africa–United States relations, Apartheid Era
- International Rights Advocates v. Apple, Microsoft, Dell, Tesla
- United States critical materials list

== Works cited ==
- Zachariades, Christina (2024). "History Repeats the Old Conceits". Filmmaker. Vol. 33, no. 1. The Gotham Film & Media Institute.
