= Andrée Blouin =

Central African Republic political activist and human rights advocate

- Blouin in the 1960s
- Born: 16 December 1921; Ndjoukou, Ubangi-Shari
- Died: 9 April 1986 (aged 64); Paris, France
- Occupations: Political activist, human rights advocate, and writer

Andrée Madeleine Blouin (16 December 1921 – 9 April 1986) was a political activist, human rights advocate, and writer from the Central African Republic.

== Early life ==
The daughter of Josephine Wouassimba, a fourteen-year-old Banziri girl, and Pierre Gerbillat, a forty-year-old French colonial businessman, Andrée Blouin was born in Bessou, a village in Oubangui-Chari (later the Central African Republic).

At three years of age Andrée was taken from her mother by her father and his new wife Henriette Poussart, and placed in the Sisters of St. Joseph of Cluny orphanage for girls of mixed race, in Brazzaville, in the French Congo, where she endured neglect and abuse. This orphanage was created to cover up evidence of Europeans’ "libertine ways" (including the crime of outright rape) and to "protect partly white children from living in supposedly primitive African conditions."

At age 15, the nuns tried to pressure her into an arranged marriage. She spent 14 years in the orphanage before she and two other girls ran away in 1938. As she grew older, she participated in many smaller forms of rebellions with her friends. She would persist in attending white-only cinemas until her presence was not tolerated. In stores, she would ask for articles in French, but the shopkeepers would purposefully "answer in Lingala or Kikongo to humiliate her." This was due to her having French citizenship, but having no real "right" to use the language. She would also ask for butter, which was "unthinkable for an African to eat," but she later stated that she "had to begin somewhere."

== Personal life ==
After escaping from the orphanage, Andrée moved with her mother to Brazzaville and began work as a seamstress. While riding on a riverboat in the Congo River, Andrée met a Belgian aristocrat named Roger Serruys. Soon afterwards, she moved in with Serruys to Banningville, where he was appointed the new director of the Belgian Kasai Company. Frustrated by his insistence that their relationship be kept a secret, Andrée returned home to Brazzaville three months pregnant. She gave birth to her daughter Rita on her 19th birthday, 16 December 1940.

Andrée met a local Frenchman named Charles Greutz, and they welcomed a son René on her 21st birthday, 16 December 1942. At two years of age, René fell ill with malaria but was refused the lifesaving quinine medication in local hospitals because "the French colonial administration insisted" that it was for "Europeans only." Blouin "pleaded" with the mayor to make an exception but was refused, and before long he died from complications related to the disease. Tramautized by the experience, Andrée decided that Rita should not grow up in colonial Africa, and after legally marrying Greutz, she and her daughter relocated to France in 1946. Greutz stayed behind in Bangui to work, while Andrée and Rita resided with the Greutz family in the town of Gebviller in Alsace.

Andrée returned to Bangui in 1948, and learned that her husband Charles was having an affair. Not long afterwards she met French engineer André Blouin, one of her husband's contemporaries, who was on assignment for the French Bureau of Mines. The two fell in love, and after Andrée's divorce from Greutz was finalized, she and André Blouin were married in 1952. The couple went on to have two children, a son named Patrick and a daughter named Sylviane.

== Activism ==
Andrée Blouin credits the untimely death of her young son as her primary motivation for becoming a political activist later in life. Her son's death from malaria could have been prevented with the right medication; however, because of his African ancestry, he was denied the proper medical treatment. More specifically, since Andreé Blouin was classified as "métisse" or "mixed" because of her African mother and European father, this label was put on her son as well, making it impossible for him to get the malaria treatment. Her son was ¾ white and both she and her son were French citizens, but they were both treated unjustly because of their blackness. This devastating and racist experience is a potential catalyst for her interest in activism. Blouin launched a campaign against the Quinine Law that prohibited individuals of African ancestry in French Equatorial Africa from receiving appropriate medication to treat malaria.

In the 1950s, she left her new husband and her daughter to travel to Guinea to support the country's independence movement. Blouin joined Sékou Touré, the leader of the Guinean Democratic Party, in the fight for independence from France. Blouin drove all over the country with members of his party, "organizing rallies and delivering speeches calling for independence." In 1958, Guinea was the sole French territory to choose independence. Through her work with Touré, she met many other activists, such as Prime Minister Kwame Nkrumah of Ghana and Félix Houphouet-Boigny of Ivory Coast.

After being expelled from Guinea by French President Charles de Gaulle for her political activism, she returned to Central Africa to support the struggle for independence from France. She organized and mobilized women for the Parti Solidaire Africain, (PSA) an organization from Belgian Congo whose goal was freeing Africa from colonial rule. Blouin described how after one month in May 1960, she enrolled 45,000 members in the PSA. Some of the preoccupations that the platform reflected were the following:

- To make all women, no matter what age, literate.
- To promote an understanding of health and hygiene.
- To combat alcoholism.
- To work for women’s rights.
- To work for the protection of the abandoned woman and child.
- To work for the social progress of the African.

The movement also outlined chapters throughout the provinces and empowered local women to take up leadership roles in the movement. Later that year she became chief of protocol in Patrice Lumumba's government, formed during the aftermath of Congolese independence from Belgium. Her position included being a "speechwriter and serving as a diplomatic liaison to European governments during the transition to independence" in the Congo. Before that, she had already shown her "mettle during the grueling weeks on the campaign trail" with the PSA. She also worked regularly with Lumumba, Gizenga, and Mulele in Leopoldville.

Blouin worked so closely with Lumumba in his "inner circle," that the press nicknamed them "team Lumum-Blouin." However, Blouin was also "assumed to be entangled in sexual relations" with different powerful men, solely because she was a woman with "clout" whose actions were "subverting conventional feminine roles." The media called her "an adventurer in the service of communism," and she was also said to be teaching women to "revolt against their husbands and homes." Many articles rarely mentioned that she was "an accomplished orator," the most "eloquent spokesperson for the PSA," and introduced many successful ideas. Furthermore, she knew how to listen to people, how to "sum up" what was needed in specific instances, and how to "calibrate her interventions accordingly." Because of her personal experience in the colonial system, she was able to "discern the machinations of the Belgians and their Congolese supporters" and "plumb the far-reaching impact of the colonial educational system, particularly on women." Moreover, her efforts to feed the crew that accompanied her on speaking tours were "fueled by her understanding of how important morale was to the success of the campaign."

When the Congolese "opposition took up arms against the country’s military dictator," Joseph Mobutu, Blouin was their "spokeswoman, first from Algiers and then from Brazzaville, where President Ahmed Ben Bella of Algeria sent her on a humanitarian mission to help children orphaned by the rebellions." To the Western diplomats and reporters, Blouin’s presence meant that Congo was becoming communist. When Lumumba was assassinated, Blouin became a target. Her daughter Eve recounts how her mother was sentenced to death and was forced to flee the Congo.

In 1973, her husband divorced her and she then decided to settle in Paris. In Europe, she continued her work as an advocate for gender and social equality, as well as for economic justice in various African countries.

During her life, her activism raised concerns in the Western world: the Eisenhower administration and the Belgian authorities worried about her supposed Communist links and the New York Times called her an "advocate of extreme African nationalism." However, she described herself as a socialist who was committed to African nationalism. Blouin’s daughter recounted how she became a "den mother" to African "opposition figures and revolutionaries" who needed a place to stay.

== Death ==
She was diagnosed with lymphoma and "had grown despondent over the oppression that continued even after the end of colonialism." She died on 9 April 1986.

== Literary works ==
Blouin's autobiography, My Country, Africa: Autobiography of a Black Pasionaria, was published in English in 1983. Jean MacKellar collaborated with Blouin and completed interviews and the editing of the book. However, Blouin rejected the book and attempted to sue MacKellar to block the publication because she was not satisfied with the story being presented in "social-psychological terms" instead of as a "political testament."

== In popular culture ==
She features prominently in the 2024 film Soundtrack to a Coup d'Etat which depicts the Congolese independence process and Lumumba's death.

== See also ==
- African nationalism
- Pan-Africanism
