= Double take =

Double take may refer to:

== Films, radio, and television ==
- Double Take (1998 film), a 1998 American-Canadian thriller film directed by Mark L. Lester
- Double Take (2001 film), a 2001 American buddy action comedy film written and directed by George Gallo
- Double Take (2009 film), a 2009 Belgian-German-Dutch thriller film, directed and written by Johan Grimonprez
- Double Take (American TV series), a 2018 hidden camera/practical joke reality streaming television series created by Chris Jones
- Double Take (Australian TV series), a 2009 sketch comedy created by Rick Kalowski and David McDonald
- "Double Take" (Code Lyoko), a Code Lyoko episode
- Doubletake, a British television comedy
- Doubletake, a 1985 American two-episode television miniseries with Richard Crenna
- Double Take, an episode from the American animated TV series The Sylvester & Tweety Mysteries

== Music ==
- Double Take (group), an American female pop duo
- Double Take (Freddie Hubbard and Woody Shaw album), 1985
- Double Take (Petra album), 2000
- "Double Take" (Dhruv song), 2019

== Other ==
- Double-take (comedy), an expression of surprise in body language
- Double-Take (NSI Product), business continuity software
- Double Take Comics, a defunct comic book publisher
- Double Take, the exercise term for DEFCON level 4

== See also ==
- The Take (disambiguation)
