= Vehicle registration plates of the Central African Republic =

The vehicle registration plates of the Central African Republic allows the identification of vehicles registered in the Central African Republic.

== Regular plates ==
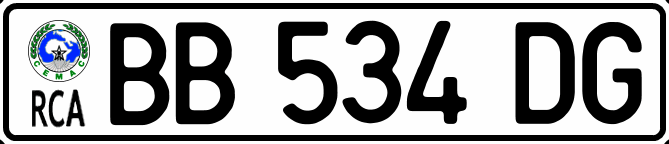

For private vehicles, it takes the form "LL CCC LL", where L are letters and C are numbers. The first group of two letters varies from DA to SZ and UB to VZ, followed by a group of three digits ranging from 001 to 999. The last two letters denote the prefecture of registration On the left is the emblem of the Central African Economic and Monetary Community (CEMAC) and the RCA code.

=== Registration codes ===
The last two letters designated the prefecture of registration.

Code	Province
BB	Bamingui-Bangoran
BG	Bangui
BK	Basse-Kotto
HB	Haut-Mbomou
HK	Haute-Kotto
KG	Kémo
LB	Lobaye
MB	Mbomou
MK	Mambéré-Kadéï
MP	Ombella-M'Poko
NG	Nana-Grébizi
SE	Sangha-Mbaéré
UA	Ouham
UK	Ouaka
UP	Ouham-Pendé
VK	Vakaga

=== Coding by type of vehicle ===
- Ax, Bx - legal entities
- Dx - individuals
- TA - temporary license plates

== Historical ==
Central African license plates have known different formats since the 1960s. The first plates were on a black background with silver characters. In the 80s, the plates pass on a blue background. Since September 1, 2006, the country has adopted CEMAC plates with black characters on a white background.

== Other formats ==
=== Temporary plates ===
Temporary license plates have a red background with white symbols. The format of such signs TA123BV, where TA series is the index of temporality, 123 - number, and BV - the region code.

== Diplomatic license plates ==
The license plates of diplomatic staff, following the French example, have a green background and orange or white symbols.

=== License plates of ambassadors ===
License plates of diplomatic ambassadors have the format 123CMD456, where 123 is the country code, CMD is index of the head of the diplomatic mission, and 456 is the number.

=== License plates of other diplomats ===
License plates of diplomatic personnel have the format 123СD456, where 123 is the country code, CD is the index of the diplomatic corps, 456 is the number.

=== Consular staff ===
License plates of administrative and technical staff of diplomatic missions have the format 123K456, where 123 is the country code, K - consul, and 456 is the number.
