= Kobarweng or Where Is Your Helicopter? =

Kobarweng or Where Is Your Helicopter? (1992) is a short documentary directed by Johan Grimonprez that deals with the history of a remote village in the highlands of New Guinea. The videotape assembles archival footage and oral histories depicting the first encounter between the Irian Jaya people and the scientific crew, including anthropologists, of the Dutch Star Mountains Expedition. The confrontation with the crew and their helicopter caused a shock that threw the worldview of the villagers upside down.

The event even entered their Sibil-tongue language; literally translated, "weng" means language, whilst "kobar" airplane. Kobarweng's title is an ironic reference to a question first posed to Grimonprez by a local man named Kaiang Tapor, who, upon Grimonprez's arrival in the village of Pepera after a three-day hike, asked him where his helicopter was. The footage in the film is traversed by a running band of script, reporting observations and remarks culled from anthropologists' interviews, eye-witness reports, and the reminiscences of those highlanders who recall those moments of 'first contact' between the white intruders (missionaries, prospectors, anthropologists, adventurers) and the local inhabitants: "We never tell everything, we always keep something for the next anthropologist" they are candid enough to admit to Margaret Mead, while another wit remarks: "We called the whites 'people of soap', but their shit smelled the same as ours."

Switching the roles of observer and observed, the relation implied in the anthropological representation is reversed: the desire of the observing anthropologist itself becomes “other”, “exotic”, an object of curiosity destabilised by the villagers' questions. According to Grimonprez: "Kobarweng critically considers the myth of objectivity, the pretence of an epistemic and scientific detachment maintained not just by the anthropologist, but throughout the discourse of western science, where the observer finds himself caught in an alienated position of transcendence over his/her subject."

== It Will Be All Right If You Come Again, Only Next Time Don't Bring Any Gear, Except a Tea Kettle... ==
In 1994, Grimonprez showcased a five-channel installation entitled It Will Be All Right If You Come Again, Only Next Time Don't Bring Any Gear, Except a Tea Kettle..., which expanded upon the themes of Kobarweng. The encounter between the different groups in 1939 up to the current problems caused by neocolonialism.

Papua New Guinea is one of the most heterogeneous countries in the world and has long been a favorite among anthropologists, with its more than 7000 years of agriculture, its hundreds of tribes and languages, some of whom have still not been "discovered". Beside a cultural-rich area, Western New Guinea is also an area with considerable reserves of gold, copper, uranium, nickel, oil and natural gas which causes environmental degradation and ongoing series of human abuses. An estimated 100.000 people have died in the region since Indonesia took control. According to a Yale university law school report "there can be little doubt that the Indonesian government has engaged in a systematic pattern of acts that has resulted in harm to a substantial part of the indigenous population of West Papua." Amnesty International found that there were no effective means for people of the public could complain against the police acting in violation of international law and standards.

== Critical reception ==
The film was acquired by the museum collections housed at the Musée National d'Art Moderne, Centre Georges Pompidou; the Stedelijk Museum Amsterdam, and Tate Modern. The film was awarded the Grand Prix de Ville de Genève - First prize at the SIV Video Biennale Saint-Gervais Genève in 1993; the First prize for the best international video creation at the Cadiz International Video Festival 1994; as well as winner for the category 'experimental documentary' at the Baltimore Film forum 1992.

== Director ==
Johan Grimonprez is a Belgian multimedia artist, filmmaker, and curator. He is well known for his films dial H-I-S-T-O-R-Y (1997) and Double Take (2009). As of 2014, Grimonprez's upcoming projects include the feature films How to Rewind Your Dog (2014) and Shadow World: Inside the Global Arms Trade (2015), based on the book by Andrew Feinstein and was awarded a production grant from the Sundance Institute. In 2011 Hatje Cantz published a reader on his work titled Johan Grimonprez: "It's a Poor Sort of Memory that Only Works Backwards", with contributions by Jodi Dean, Thomas Elsaesser, Tom McCarthy (novelist), Hans Ulrich Obrist, and Slavoj Žižek. The filmproject Kobarweng or Where is Your Helicopter? (1992), was completed during Johan Grimonprez's study at the School of Visual Arts (New York), while attending the Independent study program at the Whitney Museum.

== See also ==
- Grasberg mine
