= Mala, Central African Republic =

Mala
- sub-prefectures
- Country: Central African Republic

Government
  - Sub-Prefect: Maurile Peguy Ngoko

Mala is a sub-prefecture of Kémo in the Central African Republic.

== Geography ==
The locality is located on the regional road RR11, linking Dékoa to Grimari.

== History ==
Around 1890, warriors Ouakili and Nguerebare sowed terror in Gama located on the Kouma coast, going back to the Mbrès. As a result of a dispute, the separation of two friends in 1902 led to the exodus led by Yabalangba. After months of flight, Yabalangba settled on the borders of Malan and Zimenzéré. Yabalangba became chief of Earth. He built a fort called Gban whose remains are still visible today. Recognized as Chief of Canton in 1915, Yabalangba reigned from 1915 to 1945. On his death and will be succeeded by Jean Ndagba from 1945 to 1960 and René Gondoa from 1960 to 1964.

== Administration ==
As a result of the territorial reform of Bokassa, the Township of Yabalangba which extended until present-day city of Dékoa will be divided into Communes. The terroir of Yabangba became the commune of Mala including the villages of Kouma, Takendji, Gbolokaba, Bakouté, Zimenzéré 2, and 1, Mala 3-2-1, Mala center, Mala 6, Bila, Bokengué, Tombe Bakaroua, Massen and Assulmaka.

The last son of Yabalangba, Bernard Seremale and the first Mayor who will govern from 1964 to 1971.

Become Administrative Control Post, Mala is erected in Sub Prefecture in 2002, from a division of the sub-prefecture of Dékoa. It has 13,800 inhabitants in 2008.

The sub-prefecture is made up of the only municipality of Mala. The services of the State, formerly very present left the locality following the events of December 2012 and December 2013.

== Villages ==
The commune has 39 villages in rural areas identified in 2003: Assulemaka, Bakaroua, Banda-Mbres, Lower Kouma, Begole Banga, Bila, Bokengue, Bokoute, Galabadja, Kotage, Kouma 1, Kouma 2, Kpetene, Mala 1, Mala 2, Mala 3, Mala 4, Mala 5, Mala 6, Mala 7, Mala-Mbaka, Marba, Massene, Mbaka, Mbouroubere, Muslim, Ngourkaba 1, Ngourkaba 3, Ngourukaba 2, Optakendje, Ozo, Takendje 1, Takendji 2, Tomb, Zimanzere 1, Zimanzere 2, Zimanzere 3, Zimanzere 4, Zime 4.

== Education ==
The commune has 10 schools: Sub-prefectoral Girls and Sub-prefectoral Boys of Mala, Takendji, Ngourkaba, Kale, Badinga, Fallen, Bakaroua, Massene and Assulemaka.

== Policy ==
Lieutenant General Timothée Malendoma (deceased on December 12, 2010 at the Bangui General Hospital), originally from Gbolokaba (or Ngouroukaba) and Founding President of the Civic Forum, was the first deputy in the Mala constituency. Jacob Karoua and Ndoukoulouba will be the successors to date.
