= Johan Grimonprez =

Belgian artist and filmmaker (born 1962)

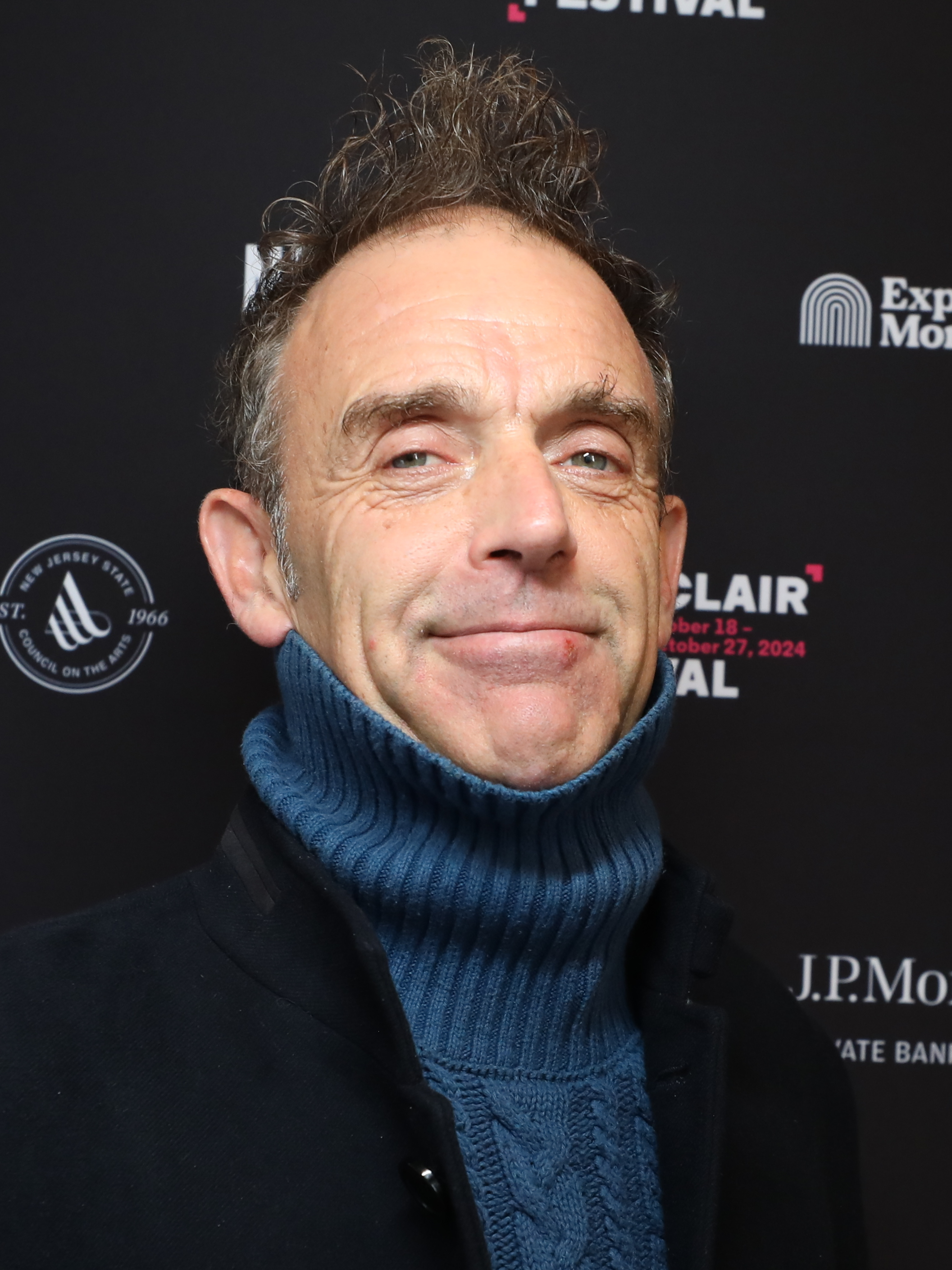
- Grimonprez in 2024
- Education: The German Academic Exchange Service (DAAD) Berlin (1997); Jan van Eyck Academy, New York (Post Graduate FA, 1995); Whitney Museum Independent Study Program, New York (1993); School of Visual Arts, New York (MFA Film & Mixed Media, 1992); School of Arts, KASK, Ghent (BA Photography & Mixed Media, 1986)
- Occupations: Filmmaker, artist, curator
- Awards: Oscar nominee for Best Documentary Feature at the 97th Academy Awards, Best Art Film at Rose d'Or Awards, Black Pearl Award: Best New Documentary Director, First Prize European Media Award, First Prize International Media Awards, Golden Spire: Best Director, Grand Prix de la Ville de Genève, Persistence of Vision San Francisco International Film Festival, Special Jury Award for Cinematic Innovation Sundance Film Festival

Johan Grimonprez (born 1962) is a Belgian multimedia artist, filmmaker, and curator. He is most known for his films Dial H-I-S-T-O-R-Y (1997), Double Take (2009) and Shadow World: Inside the Global Arms Trade (2016), based on the book by Andrew Feinstein. Grimonprez wrote and directed the documentary Soundtrack to a Coup d'Etat on the Congo Crisis which was Oscar nominated for Best Documentary Feature at the 97th Academy Awards.

== Personal life ==
Grimonprez was born in 1962 in Roeselare, Belgium. After studying cultural anthropology, he went on to complete his studies in photography and mixed media at Royal Academy of Fine Arts in Ghent. Grimonprez received an MFA in Video & Mixed Media at the School of Visual Arts in New York. In 1993, Grimonprez was accepted into Whitney Museum Independent Study Program and later attended the Jan van Eyck Academy in Maastricht, Netherlands. In 1993, Grimonprez worked on the series Besmette Stad (The Infected City) for the program Ziggurat on Belgian television. He has taught at the department of plastic arts at the Paris 8 University, the School of Visual Arts in New York and Royal Academy of Fine Arts in Ghent.

== Themes ==
His films are characterised by a criticism of contemporary media manipulation, described as "an attempt to make sense of the wreckage wrought by history"; his films "speak to the need to see history at a distance, but at the same time to speak from inside it". Other themes include the relationship between the individual and the mainstream image, the notion of zapping as "an extreme form of poetry", and the questioning of our consensus reality, which Grimonprez defines as: "a reality that is entangled with the stories we tell ourselves in the worldview we agree on sharing." Grimonprez claims that "Hollywood seems to be running ahead of reality. The world is so awash in images that we related to 9/11 through images we had already projected out into the world. In a sense, fiction came back to haunt us as reality. A perpetual distraction, this illusion of abundance staged by techno-magic hid the ugly face of an info-dystopia. Images of Abu Ghraib, 9/11, swine flu, the BP Gulf oil spill and the economic crisis composed our new contemporary sublime." Amongst Grimonprez's influences are Walter Benjamin, Jorge Luis Borges, and Don DeLillo.

== Films ==
=== Soundtrack to a Coup d'État ===
Soundtrack to a Coup d'État is an Oscar-nominated documentary about the promise of decolonisation, the hope of the non-aligned movement and the dream of self-determination. It is also about the multinational corporations working hand-in glove with the military-industrial complex to smother this very dream.

On February 16, 1961, American jazz musicians Abbey Lincoln and Max Roach crash a UN Security Council meeting to protest against the murder of Patrice Lumumba, the first democratically elected prime-minister of the Congo. Belgian embassies worldwide have to close their doors, as demonstrators are pelting eggs or simply setting the Missions ablaze. Belgium had drawn Congo into an international intrigue that tore the country apart in less than a month after its independence. Lumumba, like Kwame Nkrumah in Ghana and Nasser in Egypt, claimed that the riches of the land should become the riches of its people. Western powers, coveting colonial riches, took fright at the Pan-African movement that Lumumba personified. Washington, exploiting the hiatus left by the crumbling colonial empires, cooked up a paranoid cold-war narrative to smother the African dream of sovereignty. In September 1960, Congo had entered the UN world body together with 15 other newly independent African countries. As a result, the balance of the General Assembly majority vote tipped to the expanded Afro-Asian bloc. Taking advantage of the situation, Nikita Khrushchev, the shoe-banging leader of the Soviet bloc, invited all the heads of state to discuss demilitarisation and decolonisation at the forthcoming General Assembly in New York. By October 1960, racist policies of the US and the global interest in the civil rights movement gave ground for Soviet accusations of hypocrisy. The Eisenhower administration, in an attempt to restore its image, attempted to use US Jazz musicians to project US soft power. Sent were Louis Armstrong, Nina Simone, Duke Ellington, Dizzy Gillespie and Melba Liston.

The Los Angeles Times has defined the film as "a riveting, deeply researched archival mixtape with the breadth of a period epic, the soul of an activist march and the pulse-racing energy of a cloak-and-dagger thriller.[...] One of the year's very best documentaries"

The film was selected for the 2024 Sundance Film Festival World Cinema Documentary Competition, where it won the Special Jury Award for Cinematic Innovation. And it has been nominated for Best Documentary Feature at the 97th Academy Awards and the European Film Awards given by the European Film Academy

The film has also been nominated for the Gotham Awards, the Critics Choice Doc Awards, Cinema Eye Honors, where it won the awards for Outstanding Editing and Outstanding Sound Design, the European Film Awards, and IDA Doc Awards where it won three awards for Best Editing, Best Writing and the ABC News Videosource Award.

Soundtrack to a Coup d'État was featured in several lists of Best of 2024 and 2025.

The film featured as the third best documentary of all time by Harper's Bazaar.

=== Shadow World ===
Shadow World is a documentary about the international weapons trade. The film is based on Andrew Feinstein's book The Shadow World: Inside the Global Arms Trade (2011). Feinstein's book exposes the "parallel world of money, corruption, deceit and death" behind the trade in arms. Key interviews include: Jeremy Scahill, Chris Hedges, Michael Hardt, Noam Chomsky among others. Grimonprez claims that "the contemporary condition of what it is to be human calls into question the relevance of politics and reality, one that has collapsed under the weight of an information overload and mass deception." To him the present political debate "has schrunk into mere fear management and paranoia suddenly seems the only sensible state of being, where it is easier to ponder the end of the world than to imagine viable political alternatives. "Shying away from getting stuck into merely critiquing social evil, I began exploring alternatives. It's indeed important to say what we don't want, but more crucial is to point at what we actually do want." According to Grimonprez, the film not only exposes how corruption drives the global arms trade, while it often sets the stage for war, it hopes to offer also alternatives to the paradigm of greed, celebrated by social darwinism.

In her article "When Big Screens Meet Small Screens: Deferred Homecoming in Johan Grimonprez's Shadow World", Sabine Hillen writes: Shadow World, with its sources, editing and discursive confrontations, opens up contradictory questions. In this sense, the notion of home is everything except an easily readable arena. The pleasure of a nostalgic narrative on television recalling the past is balanced by means of a historical counter-narrative. On the one hand, the affective charges of the past are limited to familiar images on television, adapted literature and essays. On the other hand, the past has no affective affinities with the present. And yet, as this article suggests, we have to keep it in mind to remember how the economic arm trade disaster started.

=== Double Take ===
Released in 2009, Double Take combines documentary and fictional elements. The plot, written by British novelist Tom McCarthy, centres on Alfred Hitchcock and a fictitious meeting Hitchcock has with an older version of himself during the Cold War. Using the allegory of a sky-borne threat, Double Take charts the rise of the television in the domestic setting and with it, the ensuing commodification of fear. The five Folgers commercials for instant coffee that play throughout Double Take are standing for the commercial break of the television format as well as for the exploration of the theme that fear and murder lurks in the domestic setting. Inspired by the Jorge Luis Borges short story "25th August, 1983", it plays on the Hitchcockian/Borgesian aphorism that "if you should meet your double, you should kill him... Or he will kill you..." This encounter with the double or the mirroring of Hitchcock versus Hitchcock (as Hitchcock frequently doubled himself as the storyteller in his films through his cameos), sketches out the theme of the doppelgänger- the parody of the original. This mirrors the plot of rivalry between cinema (Hitchcock the filmmaker), its television double (Hitchcock the television-maker) and the younger YouTube Hitchcock. This mistaken identity is described by Grimonprez as "the uncanny feeling that in a situation, something, or someone looks exactly the same as another, but somehow is not, and hence is totally displaced. It creates an unease and a sense of anxiety announcing the impending disaster, but precisely because of this, reveals a glimpse of the sublime."

=== dial H-I-S-T-O-R-Y ===
dial H-I-S-T-O-R-Y is an essay film that traces the history of airplane hijackings as portrayed in mainstream television. Set against a backdrop of a chronology of airline hijackings, beginning with the first documented airplane hijacking in 1931, which was immediately inscribed into the political arena from the get-go. dial H-I-S-T-O-R-Y illustrates how, as hijackings got progressively more television coverage, they became more and more deadly. The nature of live television allowed for a minute by minute update of the hijack as the situation unravelled; blurring the line between entertainment and tragedy, For terrorists seeking to inscribe their struggle in history, the hijack devoid of the mediatized image of itself lost all of its communicative power. With the airplane always on the move between countries and borders as if in state of nowhere, the hijack came to symbolize the transgression across a violent border towards a political utopia. "This study in pre-Sept. 11 terrorism" is interspersed with passages from Don DeLillo's novels Mao II and White Noise, "providing a literary and philosophic anchor to the film." Questioning the role of the writer in an image saturated society, dial H-I-S-T-O-R-Y's narrative is based on an imagined dialogue between a terrorist and a novelist where the writer contends that the terrorist has hijacked his role within society: "there's a curious knot that binds novelists and terrorists. Years ago I used to think it was possible for a novelist to alter the inner life of the culture. Now bomb-makers and gunmen have taken that territory." As the plot progresses, it becomes clear that with the increasing media coverage of terrorist hijacks, this power of producing an inward societal shock has been wrestled from the writer by the terrorist. They are 'playing a zero-sum game' where "what the terrorists gain, novelists lose!" By the 1990s, the individual hijackers apparently are no more, "replaced on our TV screens by stories of state-sponsored suitcase bombs". By now, the media is increasingly involved as a key player; "the images of the individual is substituted by a flow of crowds; hijacking is replaced by anonymous suitcase bombs. [...] Since the eighties, the Reagan Administration started to accommodate the terrorist spectacle to veil its own dirty game in El Salvador, Guatemala and Nicaragua. Terrorism became merely a superficial game played through the media". In this sense, the deeper underlying theme is that the hijackers' hijack was becoming itself hijacked by news media corporations. The piece premiered in 1997 at the Musée National d'Art Moderne in Paris and was later screened at documenta X in Kassel. The Guardian included dial H-I-S-T-O-R-Y in its article "From Warhol to Steve McQueen: a history of video art in 30 works".

=== Kobarweng or Where is Your Helicopter? ===
The short documentary Kobarweng or Where is Your Helicopter? (1992) was filmed in New Guinea. The videotape assembles archival footage and oral histories depicting the first encounter between the Irian Jaya people and the scientific crew, including anthropologists, of the Dutch Star Mountains Expedition. The confrontation with the crew and their helictopter caused a shock that threw the worldview of the villagers upside down. The event even entered their Sibil-tongue language; literally translated, weng means language, whilst kobar airplane. "Kobarweng's" title is an ironic reference to a question first posed to Grimonprez by a local man named Kaiang Tapor, who, upon Grimonprez's arrival in the village of Pepera after a three-day hike, asked him where his helicopter was. The footage in the film is traversed by a running band of script, reporting observations and remarks culled from anthropologists' interviews, eye-witness reports, and the reminiscences of those highlanders, who recall those moments of "first contact" between the white intruders (missionaries, prospectors, anthropologists, adventurers) and the local inhabitants: "We never tell everything, we always keep something for the next anthropologist," they are candid enough to admit to Margaret Mead, while another wit remarks: "We called the whites 'people of soap', but their shit smelled the same as ours." According to Grimonprez:

Kobarweng critically considers the myth of objectivity, the pretence of an epistemic and scientific detachment maintained not just by the anthropologist, but throughout the discourse of western science, where the observer finds himself caught in an alienated position of transcendence over his/her subject."

In 1994, Grimonprez showcased a five-channel installation, It Will Be All Right If You Come Again, Only Next Time Don't Bring Any Gear, Except a Tea Kettle..., which expanded upon the themes of "Kobarweng". The encounter between the different groups in 1939 up to the current problems caused by neocolonialism: The province is occupied by the Indonesian military and according to a Yale University Law School report "there can be little doubt that the Indonesian government has engaged in a systematic pattern of acts that has resulted in harm to a substantial part of the indigenous population of West Papua." Amnesty International found that there were no effective means for people of the public could complain against the police acting in violation of international law and standards.

== Curated programs ==
All curated programs, in the form of a video lounge, could be seen as a media-jamming tool at the hand of an extensive collection of clips, that can be envisioned both as a global disengagement of corporations abducting our very essence, patenting and privatizing for profit, alienating our food & bodies by creating a genetically modified variant and the catalyst of debate. According to Grimonprez, the participatory elements would be sometimes as simple as a hot cup of coffee. "We would never install our video-library without having cookies, the smell of coffee and the remote control present. These elements already induce a platform of conviviality, an atmosphere for chatting. You are invited to pick up the remote to zap through your own choice of videotapes, in a way to be your own curator."

=== Beware! In Playing the Phantom, You Become One ===
Beware! In Playing the Phantom, You Become One is a videolounge based on the history of television, created in collaboration with Herman Asselberghs. In the work, Grimonprez questioned the image of the spectator as a passive consumer and seeks to detect the impact of images on our feelings, our knowledge and our memory.

=== Maybe the Sky is Really Green, and We're Just Colourblind: On Zapping, Close Encounters and the Commercial Break ===
This ongoing curated video-library/vlogging installation is a project on the history of the remote control and zapping in relation to the commercial break and how zapping and channel surfing were installed as a new way to relate to the world in the 80s. While Walter Benjamin and Sergei Eisenstein defined montage as a revolutionary tool for social analysis, MTV and CNN have surpassed this. Grimonprez said: "I saw what CNN did with war footage and then all these commercials spliced in between. I thought of the zapping as the ultimate form of poetry. It's a visual poem." The project continues as, according to Grimonprez, zapping became useless after 9/11 as all channels were beaming the very same images of the collapsing "Towering Infernos", over and over again. No longer did the media have to keep up with reality, but rather reality was now keeping up with the media. No longer happy innocent consumers of a bygone TV era, we are said to have become both avid consumers of fear and the protagonists of an increasing ubiquity of systems of surveillance.

=== On Radical Ecology and Tender Gardening ===
On Radical Ecology, commissioned by the Flemish Government Architect, approaches the themes of ecology and sustainability from a broader, social angle. This vlog aims merely at being a tool for a variety of interested parties, who are increasingly challenged by ecological questions.

== Art ==
Grimonprez made his international debut on the art circuit at the documenta X in Kassel with his dial H-I-S-T-O-R-Y in 1997. Ten years later, the first retrospective of his work, Johan Grimonprez - Retrospective 1992–2007, was exhibited at the Pinakothek der Moderne in Munich, 2007. It's a Poor Sort of Memory that Only Works Backwards followed as the first large-scale retroperspective of Grimonprez in his home country, Belgium, in the Stedelijk Museum voor Actuele Kunst (SMAK) in Ghent, 2011–2012. Artforum described the exhibition as "an unfamiliar archive [...] from the perception of fragments to the awareness of a common mentality, from the multiplicity of words to the emergence of a discourse". Several artists, among Roy Villevoy, Jan Dietvorst and Adam Curtis, were invited to contribute to this exhibition. A prominent aspect in Grimonprez's work is the sky: "a canvas on which man has always projected his mystical aspirations, his political and economic struggles, and his poetic imaginings. They abstract spaces into which the very real histories of contemporary societies are woven". According to Artforum, the critical dimension of Grimonprez's work follows close behind the "aesthetic of disaster and terror and the virtues of channel surfing in order to plunge the viewer into a state of genuine fascination". Using repetition and delay, Grimonprez works towards a second glance; a double take - just like his feature-length film Double Take (2009), and "the state of confusion in which we are kept by the media machine". Artforum states that Grimonprez "does not harangue us with denunciations but rather suggests that we reconsider the short circuits of this machine, of which we briefly catch glimpses". It's a Poor Sort of Memory that Only Works Backwards also exhibited at the Blaffer Art Museum in Houston, 2011 and the retrospective Johan Grimonprez exhibited in The Fruitmarket Gallery in Edinburgh, 2010. All Memory is Theft is his latest retrospective in 2025 at ZKM | Zentrum Kunst Medien Karlsruhe

More recently, Soundtrack to a Coup d'Etat has been screened at the MoMa - Museum of Modern Art in New York. The film has been included on J. Hoberman's list of Best of 2024 for Artforum who described it as "at once an unflinching account of cynical American realpolitik and a celebration of African American musical genius."

== Works ==
=== Books ===
- It's a poor sort of memory that only works backwards (Stuttgart: Hatje Cantz, 2011), ISBN 978-3775731300
- Looking for Alfred (London: Film and Video Umbrella, Stuttgart: Hatje Cantz Verlag, Munich: Pinakothek der Moderne, 2007), ISBN 978-1904270256
- dial H-I-S-T-O-R-Y / A Holiday From History, an essay by Slavoj Zizek (contributions by Don DeLillo, Hans Ulrich Obrist, Vrääth Öhner, Argos Editions, Brussels: zap-o matik and Stuttgart: Hatje Cantz, 2003), ISBN 978-9076855127
- Inflight Magazine (Stuttgart: Hatje Cantz, 2000), ISBN 978-3775709934
- ...we must be over the rainbow! (Santiago de Compostela: CGAC and Xunta de Galicia, 1998), ISBN 84-453-2258-3
- Beware! In playing the phantom you become one (Johan Grimonprez & Herman Asselberghs, 1994–1998) video library. French version: Prends garde! A jouer au fantôme, on le devient (Paris: Musée National d'Art Moderne /Centre Georges Pompidou, 1997). German version: Vorsicht! Wer Phantom Spielt wird selbst eins (Kassel: Documenta X, 1997)
- It will be all right if you come again, only next time don't bring any gear, except a tea kettle... (Brussels: Les Expositions du Palais des Beaux-Arts, 1994)

=== Published essays ===
- "'Maybe the Sky is Really Green, and We're Just Colourblind': On Zapping, Close Encounters and the Commercial Break", based on a text that was first published as "Remote Control. On Zapping, Close Encounters and the Commercial Break", in Are You Ready for TV? (Barcelona: MACBA, 2010–2011)
- Asselberghs, H. & Grimonprez, J. "No Man's Land", in Inflight (Stuttgart: Hatje Cantz, 2000), 10–53, based on Nergensland (Leuven: Dietsche Warande & Belfort, 1997)

== Filmography ==
=== Feature films ===
- Soundtrack to a Coup d'Etat (2024), documentary
- Blue Orchids (2017), documentary
- Shadow World (2016), documentary
- Double Take (2009)
- dial H-I-S-T-O-R-Y (1997)

=== Shorts ===
- "I may have lost forever my umbrella" (2011)
- "...because Superglue is forever" (2011), work version of How to Rewind Your Dog
- "Looking for Alfred" (2005), also installation
- "The Hitchcock Castings" (2005)
- "Ron Burrage, Hitchcock Double" (2005)
- "LOST NATION, January 1999" (1999)
- "Smell the flowers while you can" (1993)
- "Well, you can't go to California, that's the first place they'll look for you" (1993)
- "Kobarweng or Where is Your Helicopter?" (1992)
- "Nimdol June 18, 1959" (1990)

=== Television ===
- Besmette Stad, produced by Ziggurat, Belgian TV BRT/TV1 (1993, restored in 2007)

=== Multimedia ===
- Falling House, interactive installation
- YouTube Me and I Tube You, On Zapping: Close Encounters and the Commercial Break (in association with Charlotte Léouzon for Are You Ready for TV?, Barcelona: MACBA & Houston: Blaffer Art Museum & Ghent: S.M.A.K., 2010), 2-channel interactive installation and web project
- Hitchcock didn't have a belly button: Interview with Karen Black by Johan Grimonprez (in co-production with Los Angeles: The Hammer Museum Residence, 2009), audio installation
- It will be all right if you come again, only next time don't bring any gear, except a tea kettle... (Brussels: Les Expositions du Palais des Beaux-Arts & Ghent: S.M.A.K. 1994), 5-channel video installation
- Bed (Deerlijk: Gemeentemuseum, 2005), interactive installation

=== Vlogs ===
- All Memory is Theft, (made with the support of The Arts research of college Ghent, KASK HoGent, 2018-today)
- Manipulators: Maybe the sky is really green and we're just colorblind (in association with Charlotte Léouzon for Ghent: ZooLogical Garden, Munich: Pinakothek der Moderne, 2006), YouTube-o-theque
- Maybe the Sky is Really Green, and We’re Just Colourblind (Stockholm: Magasin 3, 2000–2002) video lounge
- Dorothy Doesn't Live Here Anymore... (in co-production with Büro Friedrich, Berlin, 1997–2001) video lounge
- Beware! In playing the phantom you become one (in association with Herman Asselberghs, 1994–1998) video library. French version: Prends garde! A jouer au fantôme, on le devient (Paris: Musée National d'Art Moderne /Centre Georges Pompidou, 1997). German version: Vorsicht! Wer Phantom Spielt wird selbst eins (Kassel: Documenta X, 1997)
