= Kémo =

Prefecture of the Central African Republic

Coordinates: 5°45′N 19°05′E

- Prefecture
- Kémo in the Central African Republic

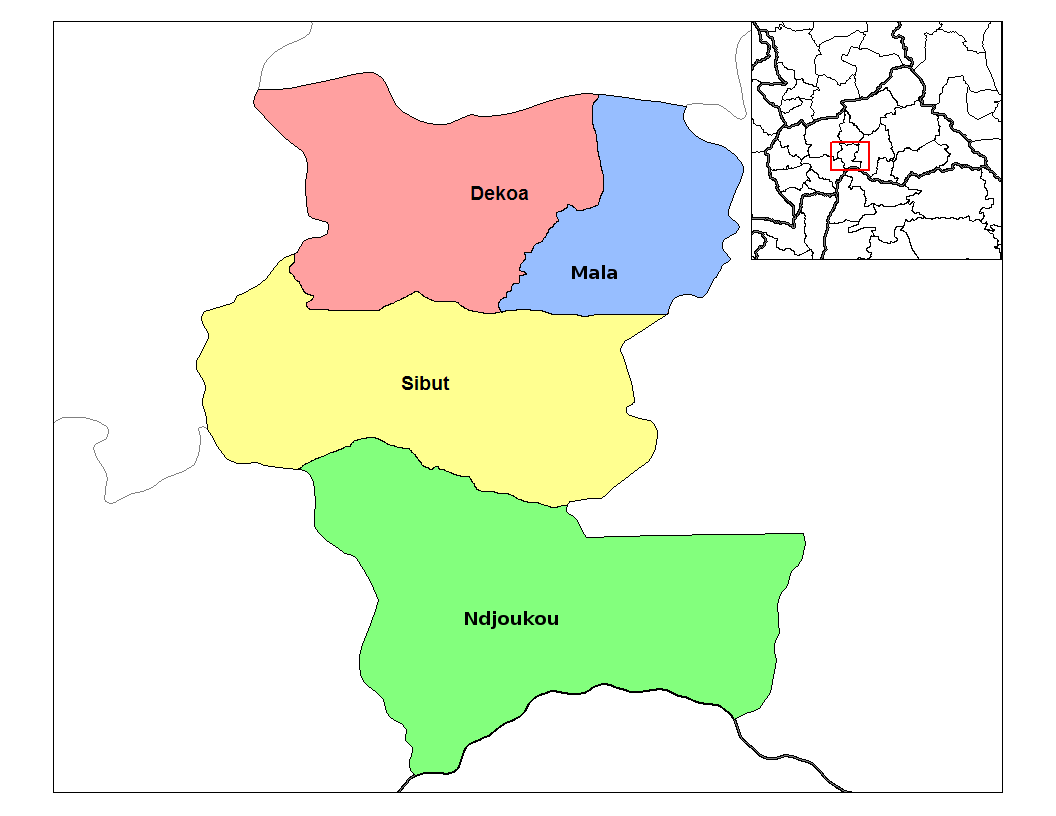
- Sub-prefectures of Kémo
- Country: Central African Republic
- Capital: Sibut

Government
  - Prefect: Vacant

Area
  - Total: 17,204 km^{2} (6,643 sq mi)

Population (2003 census)
  - Total: 118,420
  - Estimate (2024 estimation): 197,538

Kémo [ke.mo] is one of the 20 prefectures of the Central African Republic. Its capital is Sibut. In 2024, official estimates suggest the population reached 197,538 inhabitants.

== Sub-prefectures ==
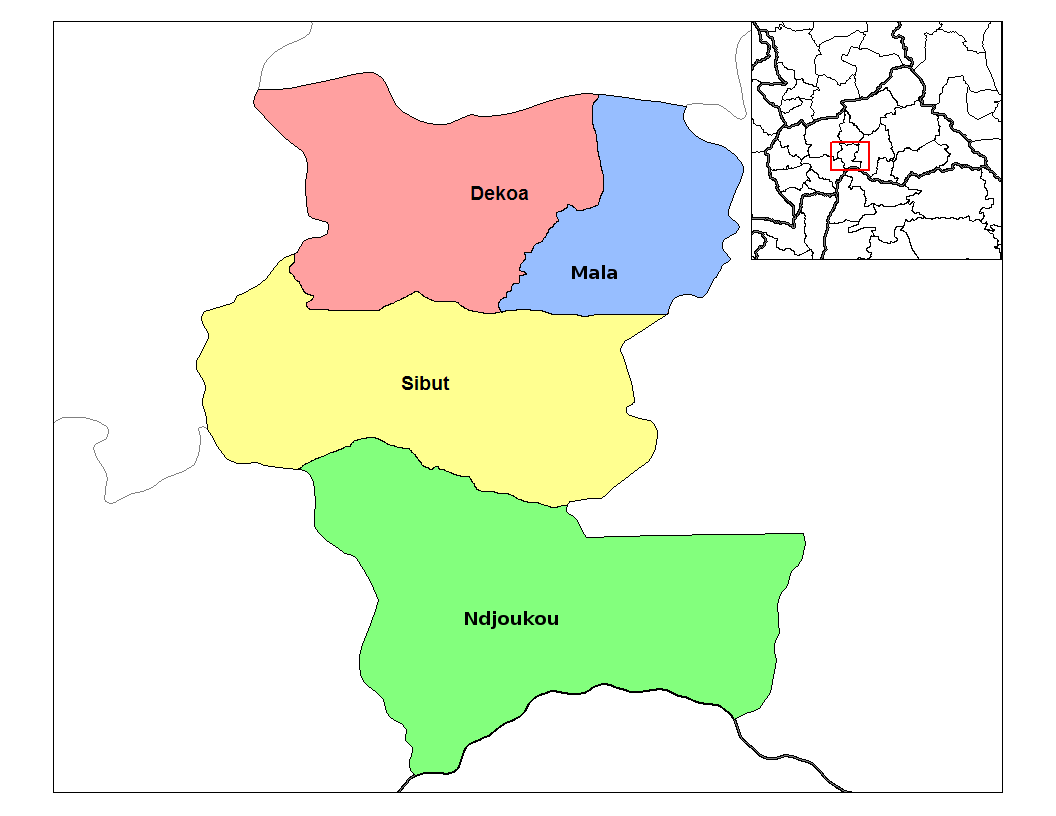
Sub-prefectures of Kemo

- Dekoa
- Sibut
- Mala
- Ndjoukou

== Notable people ==
- Andrée Blouin, political activist, human rights advocate, and writer

== See also ==
- Lake Chad replenishment project
- Waterway
