= Golden Spire =

Apple cultivar

Malus domestica 'Golden Spire'
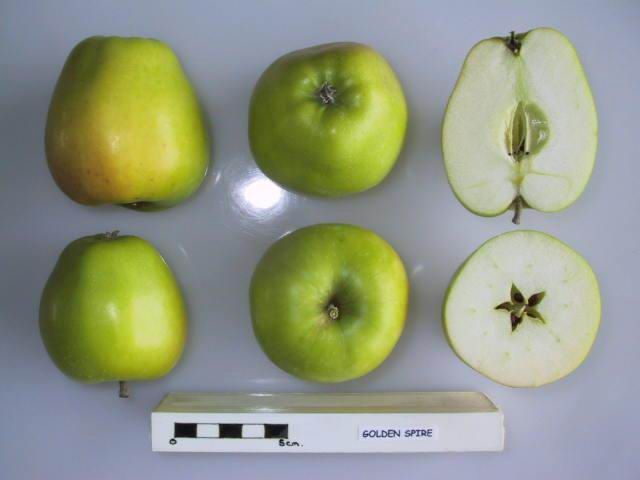
- Hybrid parentage: Unknown
- Cultivar: Golden Spire
- Origin: England, Lancashire, about 1850

The Golden Spire apple was first discovered in Lancashire, England in about 1850. It was later grown in Gloucestershire where it was known as Tom Matthews and grown for cider production, although it had previously been used for both cider and eating. It can also be used for juicing and cooking.

The fruit is of a golden yellow colour and the flesh is cream coloured, with a good sharp taste and can be identified for its long and mis-shapened appearance. The tree flowers early season and is self-fertile, making it easy to grow and produce an annual moderate to large sized crop.
