= Dial H-I-S-T-O-R-Y =

dial H-I-S-T-O-R-Y
- Hardcover with DVD video
- Directed by: Johan Grimonprez
- Written by: Johan Grimonprez
- Produced by: Johan Grimonprez
- Music by: David Shea
- Production company: Zap-O-Matik
- Distributed by: Soda Pictures
- Release date: 1997 (Paris)
- Running time: 68 minutes
- Language: English

dial H-I-S-T-O-R-Y is an experimental documentary film directed by Johan Grimonprez. It traces the history of airplane hijacking as portrayed by mainstream television media. The film premiered in 1997 at the Musée National d'Art Moderne (Centre Georges Pompidou (Paris); and at Catherine David's curated Documenta X(Kassel). "This study in pre-Sept. 11 terrorism" is composed of archival footage material — interspersing reportage shots, clips from science fiction films, found footage, home video and reconstituted scenes. The work is interspersed with passages from Don DeLillo's novels Mao II and White Noise, "providing a literary and philosophic anchor to the film". According to the director, "dial H-I-S-T-O-R-Y's narrative is based on an imagined dialogue between a terrorist and a novelist where the writer contends that the terrorist has hijacked his role within society." The film's opening line, taken from Mao II, introduces the skyjacker as protagonist. Interspersing fact and fiction, Grimonprez said that the use of archival footage to create "short-circuits in order to critique a situation" may be understood as a form of a Situationist Détournement.

The Guardian selected dial H-I-S-T-O-R-Y (1997) as one of 30 works that tell the history of video art

== Plot ==
Against a backdrop of a chronology of airline skyjacks, the plot of dial H-I-S-T-O-R-Y centers on an imagined dialogue between a novelist and a terrorist, based on passages from Don DeLillo's novels Mao II and White Noise. As the plot progresses, it becomes clear that with the increasing media coverage of terrorist hijacks, this power of producing an inward societal shock has been wrestled from the writer by the terrorist. They are 'playing a zero-sum game' where “what the terrorists gain, novelists lose!” We hear Mouna Abdel-Majid of the PLO tell a reporter, "you westerners, you don't understand ... we have to fight outside our territory and we have to bring the hope to understand our case." The act of writing/terrorizing occupies the central paradox of democracy; it is the irreconcilable tension between the individual and mass culture. Throughout much of dial H-I-S-T-O-R-Y, this mass culture becomes synonymous with pop music and the ubiquity of television, particularly its news coverage. As this image-saturated society amplifies throughout the 1960s and 70s, it becomes apparent by the 1980s that the hijackers' political message has been itself hijacked by the media. Whereas in the 1960s hijackers were portrayed as romantic revolutionaries, by the 1990s these have been replaced on television sets by anonymous bombs in suitcases. According to Alexander Provan, "The end of the film seems to suggest that the media is now the ultimate author of fictions that transform themselves into events as they're broadcast." Correlating with a steep rise of the level of violence used, this depersonalization of the terrorist is merely the accommodation of terrorist spectacle for political gain.

== Themes ==
=== History of Hijacking ===
The guiding visual thread through dial H-I-S-T-O-R-Y is an almost exhaustive chronology of airplane hijackings in the world. From Raffaele Minichiello, the first transatlantic hijacker (1969), to an anonymous and dying terrorist in St. Petersburg (1993), dial H-I-S-T-O-R-Y charts a history of airplane hijacking, and illustrates how, as hijackers got progressively more television coverage, they became more and more deadly. In this sense, the underlying theme is that the hijack was becoming itself hijacked by news media corporations. dial H-I-S-T-O-R-Y suggests that hijackers and television evolved a deadly symbiosis: on the one hand, with their protracted duration, hijackings allowed for enough time to the television cameras to be set up. The nature of live television allowed for a minute-by-minute update of the hijack as the situation progressed; this blurred the line between entertainment and tragedy. Television coverage stressed the extraordinary nature of the unfolding events (first transatlantic hijack, first live TV broadcast of a hijack, first attack on a skyjacked plane, etc.) as the only material suitable for television. On the other hand, for terrorists seeking to inscribe their struggle in history, the hijack devoid of the mediatized image of itself lost all of its communicative power. With the airplane always on the move between countries and borders as if belonging nowhere, the hijack came to symbolize the transgression across a violent border towards a political utopia.

== Inflight ==
Inflight Magazine, a companion reader to dial H-I-S-T-O-R-Y, is a parody based on the safety instructions pamphlets and glossy airline magazines provided for the passenger's edification and entertainment. It functions as an artistic manual for hijackers, equipped with such essentials as a safety instruction card and a barf bag. It includes excerpts from William S. Burroughs (FORE!); Leila Khaled ("Weapons Gave Me Words") Bernie Rhodes ("These Ears of Crime"), Tim McGirk (Wired For Warfare) and Richard Thieme ('Beep' Theory), Jodi Dean ('No place like home') among others.

== Critical reception ==
Roberta Smith described the film as "exceptional for its juice and its stomach churning power". "A Holiday From History", an essay by Slavoj Zizek was published in conjunction with the DVD release of the film with contributions by Don DeLillo, Hans Ulrich Obrist and Vrääth Öhner.

== Music ==
New York composer David Shea wrote the soundtrack to this "disquieting reflection on contemporary history"

== Awards ==
Golden Spire 'Best Director', San Francisco International Film Festival.

Director's Choice at Images, Toronto International Film Festival.
