= Ndjoukou =

- sub-prefectures
- Location in Central African Republic
- Coordinates: 5°07′36″N 19°23′59″E
- Country: Central African Republic
- Prefecture: Kémo

Government
  - Sub-Prefect: Jean-Pierre Pounatongo

Ndjoukou is a sub-prefecture of Kémo in the Central African Republic.

== Geography ==
The locality is located in the municipality of Galabadja on the right bank of Oubangui, south of Sibut.

== History ==
The February 2, 1895, the spiritual father Joseph Moreau founded the Catholic mission of the Holy Family of Banziris of Bessou which is with Bangui, one of the two oldest Catholic missions of the country.

=== Civil war ===
On 25 March 2013 Séléka took control of Ndjoukou. They installed their base there and appointed new mayor. They established checkpoints and looted civilians houses. On 6 April Séléka fighters ransacked local hospital. On 10 October they killed two civilians and burnt down at least 16 homes after local hunter injured one of Séléka fighters. In December 2015 Ndjoukou was reported to be Anti-balaka stronghold. In September 2018 Anti-balakas kidnapped older man in the village and released him only after receiving a ransom. Between 4 and 6 February 2020 heavy clashes erupted between Anti-balaka and ex-Seleka forces in Ndjoukou subprefecture resulting in deaths and displacement of population. On 12 March 2021 it was finally recaptured by government forces.

== Company ==
The Catholic parish of the Holy Family of Ndjoukou founded in 1895 is the oldest of the country after Saint Paul des Rapides in Bangui. Today it depends on the diocese of Kaga-Bandoro.

== Administration ==
The sub-prefecture of Ndjoukou consists of two communes: Galafondo and Galabadja. In 2003, it has 28,491 inhabitants.
