= List of Catholic dioceses in the Central African Republic =

The Roman Catholic Church in the Central African Republic consists only of a Latin hierarchy, joint in the national Episcopal Conference of the Central African Republic, comprising two ecclesiastical provinces, each composed of a metropolitan archdiocese and suffragan dioceses.

There are no Eastern Catholic, pre-diocesan or other exempt jurisdictions.

There are no titular sees. All defunct jurisdictions have current successor sees;

There is an Apostolic Nunciature to the Central African Republic, as papal diplomatic representation (embassy-level), in national capital Bangui.

== Current Latin dioceses ==
=== Ecclesiastical Province of Bangui ===
- Metropolitan Archdiocese of Bangui
  - Diocese of Alindao
  - Diocese of Bambari
  - Diocese of Bangassou
  - Diocese of Kaga-Bandoro

=== Ecclesiastical Province of Berbérati ===
- Metropolitan Archdiocese of Berbérati
  - Diocese of Bossangoa
  - Diocese of Bouar
  - Diocese of Mbaïki

== See also ==
- List of Catholic dioceses (structured view)

== Sources and external links ==
- GCatholic.org - data for all sections.
- Catholic-Hierarchy entry.
