= Nestor-Désiré Nongo-Aziagbia =

Central African Catholic prelate (born 1970)

The Most Reverend Nestor-Désiré Nongo-Aziagbia
- Bishop of Bossangoa, Central African Republic
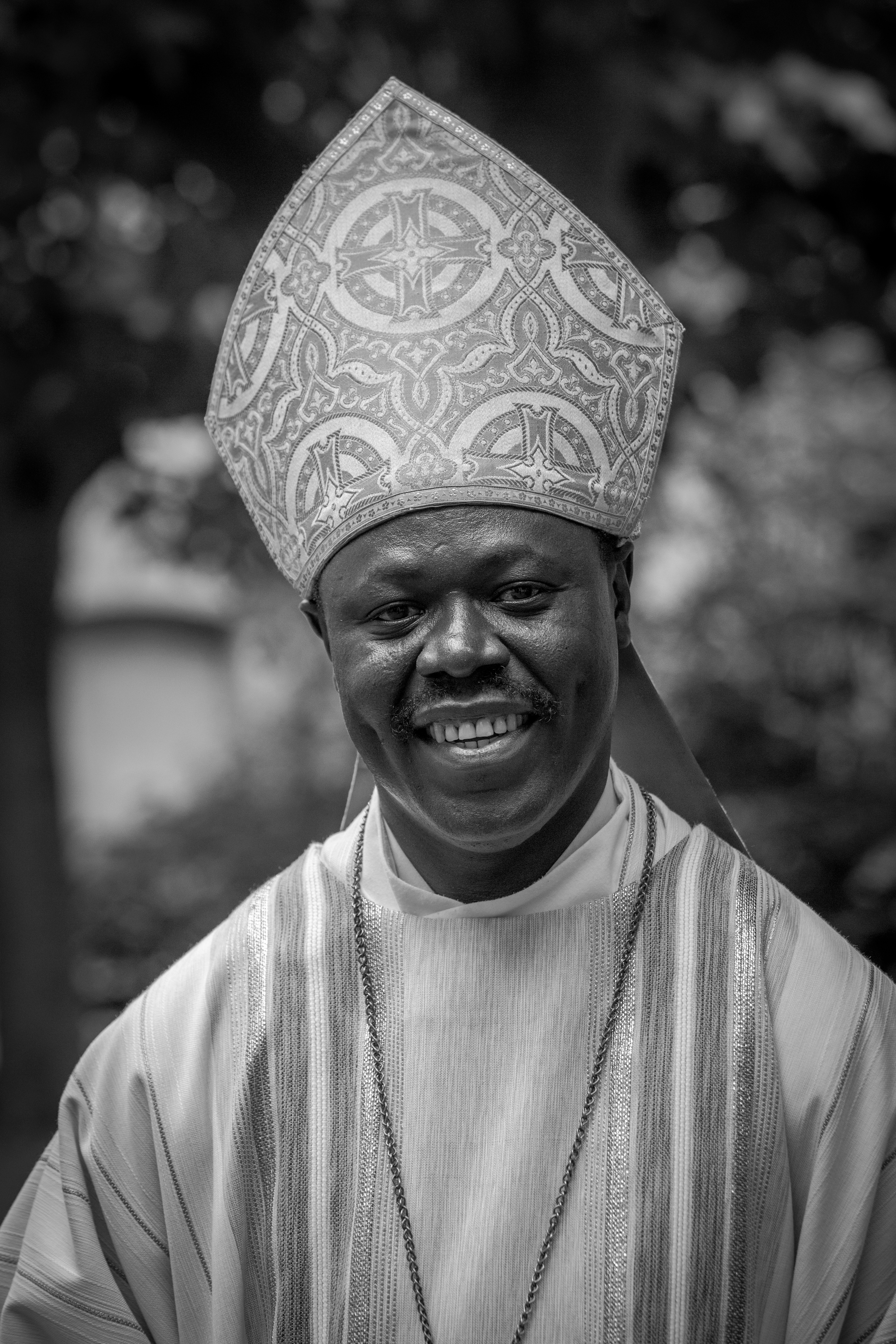
- Bishop Nestor-Désiré Nongo-Aziagbia, S.M.A. in 2014
- Church: Catholic Church
- Archdiocese: Roman Catholic Archdiocese of Berbérati
- See: Diocese of Bossangoa
- Appointed: 14 May 2012
- Installed: 22 July 2012
- Predecessor: François-Xavier Yombandje (3 April 2004 - 16 May 2009)
- Successor: Incumbent

Orders
- Ordination: 23 August 1998
- Consecration: 22 July 2012 by Fernando Cardinal Filoni
- Rank: Bishop

Personal details
- Born: Nestor-Désiré Nongo-Aziagbia; 6 March 1970 (age 56) Mbaïki, Diocese of Mbaïki, Lobaye, Central African Republic
- Motto: "Venez Et Voyez" (Come And See)

Styles of Nestor-Désiré Nongo-Aziagbia
- Reference style: Your Lordship; The Most Reverend
- Spoken style: His Lordship
- Religious style: Bishop

Nestor-Désiré Nongo-Aziagbia S.M.A. (born 6 March 1970), is a Central African Catholic prelate who serves as the bishop of the Roman Catholic Diocese of Bossangoa, Central African Republic since 14 May 2012. Before that, from 23 August 1998 until 14 May 2012, he served as a priest. He was appointed by Pope Benedict XVI. He received his episcopal consecration on 22 July 2012 at Bangui, by the hands of Cardinal Fernando Filoni. Bishop Nestor-Désiré Nongo-Aziagbia is a professed member of the Society of African Missions, a Catholic relgious order.

== Early life and education ==
He was born on 6 March 1970 at Mbaïki, Diocese of Mbaïki, Lobaye, Central African Republic. He studied philosophy at the Saint Marc National Major Seminary in Bangui. He then studied theology at the Saints Peter and Paul Major Seminary, in Ibadan, Nigeria. Later he graduated with a Licentiate in Dogmatic Theology from the University of Strasbourg, in France. His Doctorate was awarded by the same university.

== Priest ==
He took his vows as a member of the Society of African Missions in 1994. He was ordained a priest for his religios oder on 23 August 1998. He served as a priest until 14 May 2012. While a priest, he served in various roles and locations, including:

- Parish vicar and parish priest, Diocese of Kontagora in Nigeria from 1998 until 2004.
- Director of vocations, Diocese of Kontagora, Nigeria from 1998 until 2004.
- Member of the Council for Economic Affairs, Diocese of Kontagora, Nigeria from 1998 until 2004.
- Member of the Diocesan Board of Councillors, Diocese of Kontagora, Nigeria from 1998 until 2004.
- Superior of the Community of Haguenau in Strasbourg, France from 2004 until 2012.
- Superior of the above district of S.M.A. Fathers from 2004 until 2012.
- Pastor of the parish Community "Terre des missions" of Weitbruch, Gries, Kurtzenhouse, Niederschaeffolsheim and Harthouse from 2004 until 2012.
- Chaplain of the College of the S.M.A Fathers of Haguenau, France from 2004 until 2012.

== Bishop ==
On 14 May 2012, Pope Benedict XVI appointed him Bishop of the Catholic Diocese of Bossangoa, Central African Republic. He was consecrated bishop at Bangui, on 22 July 2012 by Cardinal Fernando Filoni, Cardinal-Deacon of Nostra Signora di Coromoto in San Giovanni di Dio assisted by Jude Thaddeus Okolo, Titular Archbishop of Novica and Edouard Mathos, Bishop of Bambari. In April 2014, Bishop Nestor Désiré Nongo-Aziagbia, together with three priests from his diocese, was abducted by Seleka Rebels and earmarked for execution. According to the bishop's own narrative, the execution orders were rescinded by a senior Seleka officer. The bishop and the three priests were rescued via helicopter by MISCA forces.

== See also ==
- Catholic Church in the Central African Republic

== Succession table ==
Catholic Church titles
Preceded by François-Xavier Yombandje (3 April 2004 - 16 May 2009)	Bishop of Bossangoa (since 14 May 2012)	Succeeded by (Incumbent)
