= Victor Hugo Castillo Matarrita =

Costa Rican Catholic missionary prelate (born 1963)

The Most Reverend Victor Hugo Castillo Matarrita
- Bishop of Kaga-Bandoro; Central African Republic
- Church: Catholic Church
- Archdiocese: Roman Catholic Archdiocese of Bangui
- See: Diocese of Kaga-Bandoro
- Appointed: 5 September 2024
- Installed: 17 November 2024
- Predecessor: Zbigniew Tadeusz Kusy (27 September 2015 – 31 March 2024)
- Successor: Incumbent

Orders
- Ordination: 8 August 1992
- Consecration: 17 November 2024 by Cardinal Dieudonné Nzapalainga

Personal details
- Born: Victor Hugo Castillo Matarrita; 19 March 1963 (age 63) Mansión, Diocese of Tilarán, Guanacaste Province, Costa Rica
- Motto: "Ego sum tecum" (I am with you)

Styles of Victor Hugo Castillo Matarrita
- Reference style: His Grace; The Most Reverend
- Spoken style: Your Grace
- Religious style: Bishop

Victor Hugo Castillo Matarrita M.C.C.I. (born 19 March 1963) is a Costa Rican missionary Catholic prelate who serves as the bishop of the Roman Catholic Diocese of Kaga-Bandoro, in the Central African Republic since 5 September 2024. Before that, from 8 August 1992 until he was appointed bishop, he served as a priest for the Comboni Missionaries of the Heart of Jesus, a Catholic clerical male religious order. He was appointed bishop by Pope Francis. He received his episcopal consecration at Kaga-Bandoro on 17 November 2024 by the hands of Cardinal Dieudonné Nzapalainga, Archbishop of Bangui. He is a professed member of the Comboni Missionaries.

== Background and education ==
He was born on 19 March 1963 in Mansión, Diocese of Tilarán, Guanacaste Province, Costa Rica. He studied at seminary in Paris, France where he studied philosophy and theology. While there, he joined the Comboni Missionaries of the Heart of Jesus. He took his perpertual vows for his religious congregation on 27 September 1991.

== Priest ==
He was ordained a priest for the Comboni Missionaries on 8 August 1992 in Costa Rica. He served as a priest until 5 September 2024. While a priest, he served in various roles and locations, including:

- Missionary in the Central African Republic and parish priest in Grimari from 1993 until 1998.
- Formator and local superior in the Postulate of the Comboni Missionaries in Bangui from 1998 until 2001.
- Provincial delegate and president of the Conference of Major Superiors in Central Africa from 2002 until 2007.
- Formator of postulants in San José, Costa Rica and counsellor of the Central American delegation from 2008 until 2009.
- Provincial superior for Central America from 2013 until 2020.
- Chargé for Comboni student priests in Rome from 2020 until 2022.
- Provincial superior of the Comboni Missionaries in Central Africa from 2023 until 2024.

== Bishop ==
On 5 September 2024, Pope Francis appointed Father Victor Hugo Castillo Matarrita, a Comboni Missionary and previously the Provincial Superior for the Comboni Missionaries in Central Africa, as Bishop of the Catholic Diocese of Kaga-Bandoro in the Central African Republic.

Victor Hugo Castillo Matarrita, M.C.C.I. was consecrated bishop on 17 November 2024 in the Cathedral of Kaga-Bandoro. The Principal Consecrator was Cardinal Dieudonné Nzapalainga, Archbishop of Bangui. He was assisted by Nestor-Désiré Nongo-Aziagbia, Bishop of Bossangoa and Mirosław Gucwa, Bishop of Bouar.

== See also ==
- Roman Catholicism in the Central African Republic

== Succession table ==
Catholic Church titles
Preceded by Zbigniew Tadeusz Kusy (27 September 2015 – 31 March 2024)	Bishop of Kaga-Bandoro (since 5 September 2024)	Succeeded by (Incumbent)
