= Armando Umberto Gianni =

Italian-born Central African Catholic bishop (1939–2026)

The Most Reverend Armando Umberto Gianni O.F.M. Cap.
- Bishop of Bouar
- Church: Catholic Church
- Archdiocese: Berbérati
- Diocese: Bouar
- Appointed: 27 February 1978
- Installed: 19 November 1978
- Term ended: 2 December 2017
- Predecessor: Diocese established
- Successor: Mirosław Gucwa

Orders
- Ordination: 21 September 1963
- Consecration: 19 November 1978 by Joachim N'Dayen, Alphonse-Célestin-Basile Baud and Samuel Gaumain

Personal details
- Born: 23 September 1939 Gragnola, Fosdinovo, Kingdom of Italy
- Died: 10 August 2026 (aged 86) Genoa, Italy
- Motto: Ad Jesum per Mariam

Armando Umberto Gianni O.F.M. Cap. (23 September 1939 – 10 August 2026) was an Italian-born Roman Catholic prelate who served as the first Bishop of Bouar in the Central African Republic from 1978 to 2017. He was a missionary in the Central African Republic from 1964 and served as bishop of Bouar for nearly four decades.

== Early life and religious ministry ==
Gianni was born on 23 September 1939 in Gragnola, in the province of Massa-Carrara, Italy. He entered the Order of Friars Minor Capuchin in 1955, made temporary vows in 1956 and perpetual vows on 9 October 1960. He was ordained a priest on 21 September 1963.

After his priestly ordination, Gianni went to the Central African Republic as a missionary in August 1964. He served as a parish priest in Bozoum and subsequently in Ngaoundaye. In December 1977 he was elected regular superior of the Capuchins in the Bouar region.

== Episcopate ==
On 27 February 1978, Pope Paul VI appointed Gianni the first bishop of the newly established Diocese of Bouar. The appointment was recorded in the Holy See's Acta Apostolicae Sedis, which described him as a member of the Capuchin Order, regular superior, parish priest and director of a centre for Christian doctrine.

Gianni was consecrated a bishop on 19 November 1978 in Bouar. Gianni became the first ordinary of the new diocese and remained in office until his retirement in 2017. He chose as his episcopal motto "Ad Jesum per Mariam".

During his episcopate, Gianni was involved in pastoral and social work in the Central African Republic. At the Synod of Bishops' 2009 Special Assembly for Africa, he was identified as Bishop of Bouar and president of the Episcopal Conference of the Central African Republic.

== Retirement ==
On 2 December 2017, Pope Francis accepted Gianni's resignation from the pastoral government of the Diocese of Bouar. Mirosław Gucwa, a priest of the Diocese of Tarnów who had served as vicar general of Bouar, was appointed his successor.

Gianni was subsequently bishop emeritus of Bouar. He had led the diocese for almost 40 years.

== Death ==
Gianni died in Genoa, Italy, on 10 August 2026 at the age of 86. His death was announced by the chancellor of the Central African Episcopal See. The Diocese of Bouar and its faithful were invited to pray for him, with funeral arrangements to be announced separately.

== See also ==
- Roman Catholicism in the Central African Republic
- Roman Catholic Diocese of Bouar
- Order of Friars Minor Capuchin

Catholic Church titles
Preceded by Diocese established	Bishop of Bouar; 1978–2017	Succeeded by Mirosław Gucwa
