= Bertrand Guy Richard Appora-Ngalanibé =

Central African Catholic prelate (born 1972)

The Most Reverend Bertrand Guy Richard Appora-Ngalanibé
- Bishop of Bambari, Central African Republic
- Church: Catholic Church
- Archdiocese: Roman Catholic Archdiocese of Bangui
- See: Diocese of Bambari
- Installed: 28 April 2017
- Predecessor: Edouard Mathos (6 November 2004 - 28 April 2017)
- Other post: Coadjutor Bishop of Bambari (10 December 2016 - 28 April 2017)

Orders
- Ordination: 1 November 2004
- Consecration: 25 March 2017 by Cardinal Dieudonné Nzapalainga
- Rank: Bishop

Personal details
- Born: Bertrand Guy Richard Appora-Ngalanibé; 3 April 1972 (age 54) Bangui, Archdiocese of Bangui, Central African Republic

Styles of Bertrand Guy Richard Appora-Ngalanibé
- Reference style: Your Lordship; The Most Reverend
- Spoken style: His Lordship
- Religious style: Bishop

Bertrand Guy Richard Appora-Ngalanibé O.P. (born 3 April 1972) is a Central African Roman Catholic prelate who serves as the bishop of Roman Catholic Diocese of Bambari, in the Central African Republic, since 28 April 2017. Before that, from 10 December 2016 until 28 April 2017, he served as Coadjutor Bishop of Bambari. He succeeded Bishop Edouard Mathos, the previous local ordinary, who died in office on 28 April 2017. Bertrand Guy Richard Appora-Ngalanibé served as a priest for his religious order from 1 November 2004 until 10 December 2016. He was appointed bishop by Pope Francis. His episcopal consecration took place onch 25 Mar 2017 at Bangui, by the hands of Cardinal Dieudonné Nzapalainga, C.S.Sp., Archbishop of Bangui. He succeeded as the local ordinary on 28 April 2017, upon the death of Bishop Edouard Mathos. He is a professed member of the Order of Friars Preachers, a Catholic religious order.

== Background and education ==
He was born in Bangui, Central African Republic on 3 April 1972. He studied in the CAR and in various other African countries. He studied at the Catholic University of West Africa, in the Ivory Coast. He studied at the Catholic University of Congo, in the Democratic Republic of the Congo. He studied at the Catholic University of Central Africa, in Yaoundé, Cameroon and at the Free University of Congo in Brazzaville, Republic of the Congo. He holds an Advanced Diploma in Civil Law and a Licentiate in Moral Theology and Philosophy.

== Priest ==
In 2001, he took his preliminary vows as a member of the Order of Friars Preachers. He took his perpetual vows in 2001. He was ordained a priest for his religious order on 1 Nov 2004. He served as a priest until 10 December 2016. While a priest, he served in various roles and location, including:

- University Chaplain and Parochial Vicar of the University Chaplaincy of Saint Thomas Aquinas, Douala, Cameroon from 2006 until 2008.
- Director of Students in the Vicariate of Equatorial Africa from 2006 until 2010.
- Professor of Fundamental Moral Theology at the Ecole Cathdrale de Thologie in Douala, Cameroon from 2007 until 2008).
- University Chaplain at the Free University of Congo-Brazzaville from 2008 until 2010.
- Professor at the Major Seminary of Brazzaville and member of the Formation Council of the Inter-Novitiate from 2008 until 2012.
- Professor and Spiritual Director at the Major Seminary of Saint Mark in Bangui, from 2012 until 2016.
- Superior of the Dominican Community in Bangui.
- President of the Conference of Major Superiors in Central Africa.

== Bishop ==
On 10 December 2016, Pope Francis appointed him coadjutor bishop of the Diocese of Bambari. He was consecrated bishop on 25 March 2017, at the Archdiocesan Cathedral in Bangui. The Principal Consecrator was Cardinal Dieudonné Nzapalainga, C.S.Sp., Archbishop of Bangui who was assisted by Pierre René Ferdinand Raffin, O.P., Bishop Emeritus of Metz and Cyr-Nestor Yapaupa, Bishop of Alindao. He succeeded as local ordinary on 28 April 2017, upon the death of Bishop Edouard Mathos, the previous local ordinary. He continues to serve in an extreme social and security environment.

== See also ==
- Catholic Church in the Central African Republic

== Succession table ==
Catholic Church titles
Preceded by Edouard Mathos (6 Nov 2004 - 28 April 2017)	Bishop of Bambari (since 28 April 2017)	Succeeded by (Incumbent)
Preceded by	Coadjutor Bishop of Bambari (10 December 2016 - 28 April 2017)	Succeeded by
