= Episcopal Conference of the Central African Republic =

Assembly of Catholic bishops in the Central African Republic

The Central African Episcopal Conference (French: Conférence Episcopal Centrafricaine), established in 1970, is the episcopal conference of the Catholic Church in the Central African Republic. The CAEC is a member of the Association of Episcopal Conferences of the Region of Central Africa (ACEAC) and Symposium of Episcopal Conferences of Africa and Madagascar (SECAM).

List of presidents of the Bishops' Conference:

1970–1997: Joachim N'Dayen, Archbishop of Bangui

1997–2005: Paulin Pomodimo, Bishop of Bossangoa and Archbishop of Bangui

2005–2008: François-Xavier Yombandje, Bishop of Bossangoa

2008–2009: Paulin Pomodimo, Archbishop of Bangui

2009–2010: Armando Umberto Gianni, Bishop of Bouar

from 2010: Edouard Mathos, Bishop of Bambari

== See also ==
- Episcopal conference
- Catholic Church in the Central African Republic
