= Diocese of Bambari =

Latin Catholic territory in the Central African Republic

Coordinates: 5.7546°N 20.6785°E

Diocese of Bambari Dioecesis Bambaritana

Location
- Country: Central African Republic
- Ecclesiastical province: Bangui
- Metropolitan: Bangui

Statistics
- Area: 173,000 km^{2} (67,000 sq mi)
- Population: Total; Catholics: (as of 2014); 429755; 104129 (24.2%)
- Parishes: 14

Information
- Denomination: Catholic Church
- Sui iuris church: Latin Church
- Rite: Roman Rite
- Established: December 18, 1965
- Cathedral: Cathédrale Saint Joseph, Bambari, Ouaka
- Secular priests: 25

Current leadership
- Pope: Leo XIV
- Bishop: Bertrand Guy Richard Appora-Ngalanibé, O.P
- Metropolitan Archbishop: Dieudonné Nzapalainga, C.S.Sp.
- Bishops emeritus: Jean-Claude Rembanga

Map
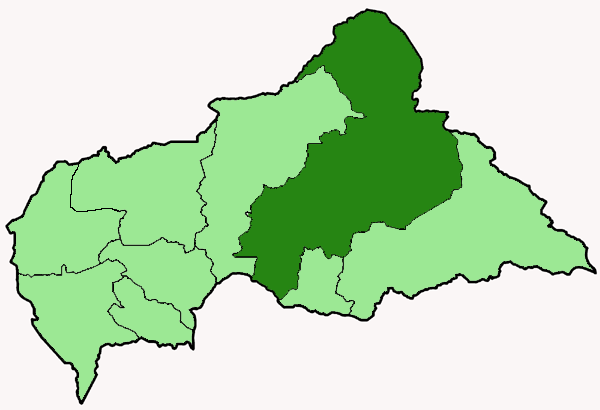

The Diocese of Bambari (Latin: Dioecesis Bambaritana) is a Latin Church ecclesiastical jurisdiction or diocese of the Catholic Church in the Central African Republic. The diocese is a suffragan in the ecclesiastical province of the metropolitan Archdiocese of Bangui, which covers the Central African Republic, but depends on the missionary Roman Congregation for the Evangelization of Peoples.

The diocese's episcopal see is Bambari. Its cathedral and is Cathédrale Saint Joseph, dedicated to Saint Joseph, in Bambari, Ouaka.

== History ==
Established on December 18, 1965, as Diocese of Bambari, on territory split off from its Metropolitan, the Archdiocese of Bangui.

== Statistics ==
As of 2014, it pastorally served 104,129 Catholics (24.2% of 429,755 total) on 173,000 km² in 14 parishes and 4 missions with 25 priests (23 diocesan, 2 religious), 22 lay religious (2 brothers, 20 sisters) and 7 seminarians.

== Bishops ==
=== Apostolic Administrators ===
1. Apostolic administrator Joachim N’Dayen (1970–1978) while Archbishop of Bangui (Central African Republic) (September 16, 1970 – July 26, 2003), President of Central African Episcopal Conference (1970 – 1997), later President of Association of Episcopal Conferences of the Central Africa Region (1989 – 1994); previously Titular Archbishop of Culusi (September 5, 1968 – September 16, 1970) as Coadjutor Archbishop of Bangui (September 5, 1968 – succession September 16, 1970)
2. Apostolic Administrator Father Michel Marie Joseph Maître, Spiritans (C.S.Sp.) (born France) (1978 – June 19, 1981, see below)

=== Bishops ===
1. Michel Marie Joseph Maître, C.S.Sp. (see above June 19, 1981 – death February 20, 1996)
2. Jean-Claude Rembanga (February 29, 1996 – retired November 6, 2004)
3. Édouard Mathos (November 6, 2004 – died April 28, 2017), also President of Central African Episcopal Conference (February 2010 – July 2013); previously Titular Bishop of Giufi (August 28, 1987 – November 6, 2004), first as Auxiliary Bishop of Diocese of Bossangoa (Central African Republic) (August 28, 1987 – January 26, 1991), then as Auxiliary Bishop of Archdiocese of Bangui (Central African Republic (January 26, 1991 – November 6, 2004)
4. Bertrand Guy Richard Appora-Ngalanibé, Dominican Order (O.P.) (April 28, 2017 - ...), succeeding as previous coadjutor-bishop (December 10, 2016 – April 28, 2017)

=== Coadjutor bishops ===
- Jean-Claude Rembanga (1995-1996)
- Bertrand Guy Richard Appora-Ngalanibé, O.P. (2016-2017)

== See also ==
- List of Catholic dioceses in the Central African Republic
- Catholic Church in the Central African Republic

== Sources and external links ==
- GCatholic.org
- "Diocese of Bambari". Catholic-Hierarchy.org. David M. Cheney.
