= Peter Marzinkowski =

German Roman Catholic prelate (1939–2024)

His Excellency Peter Marzinkowski CSSp
- Bishop Emeritus of Alindao
- Metropolis: Bangui
- Installed: 18 December 2004
- Term ended: 19 March 2014
- Predecessor: First
- Successor: Cyr-Nestor Yapaupa

Orders
- Ordination: 21 July 1966
- Consecration: 3 April 2005 by Paulin Pomodimo

Personal details
- Born: 19 March 1939 Liegnitz, Gau Silesia, Germany
- Died: 21 October 2024 (aged 85) Dormagen, North Rhine-Westphalia, Germany
- Motto: Ut omnes unum sint (They all may be one)

Peter Marzinkowski (19 March 1939 – 21 October 2024) was a German Roman Catholic prelate of the Congregation of the Holy Spirit. He was appointed bishop of Alindao from 2004 to 2014. He died at Knechtsteden Abbey in Dormagen, on 21 October 2024, at the age of 85.

Catholic Church titles
Preceded by First	Bishop of Alindao; 2004–2014	Succeeded by Cyr-Nestor Yapaupa
