= Cyr-Nestor Yapaupa =

Central African Catholic prelate (born 1970)

The Most Reverend Cyr-Nestor Yapaupa
- Bishop of Alindao; Central African Republic
- Church: Catholic Church
- Archdiocese: Roman Catholic Archdiocese of Bangui
- See: Diocese of Alindao
- Appointed: 19 March 2014
- Installed: 19 March 2014
- Predecessor: Peter Marzinkowski (18 December 2004 - 19 March 2014)
- Successor: Incumbent

Orders
- Ordination: 18 March 2001
- Consecration: 22 July 2012 by Fernando Cardinal Filoni

Personal details
- Born: Cyr-Nestor Yapaupa; 26 February 1970 (age 56) Bangassou, Mbomou Prefecture, Central African Republic

Styles of Cyr-Nestor Yapaupa
- Reference style: His Grace; The Most Reverend
- Spoken style: Your Grace
- Religious style: Bishop

Cyr-Nestor Yapaupa (born 26 February 1970) is a Central African Catholic prelate who serves as the Bishop of the Roman Catholic Diocese of Alindao, Central African Republic since 19 Mar 2014. Before that, from 14 May 2012 until 19 March 2024, he served as Coadjutor Bishop of the same Catholic See. He was appointed bishop by Pope Benedict XVI. His episcopal consecration took place at Bangui on 22 July 2012 by the hands of Cardinal Fernando Filoni. On 19 March 2014, Bishop Cyr-Nestor Yapaupa succeeded Bishop Peter Marzinkowski, C.S.Sp., whose age-related retirement was accepted that same day.

== Background and education ==
He was born on 26 February 1970, in Bangassou, Mbomou Prefecture, Central African Republic. He studied philosophy and theology at the Saint Marc Major Seminary in Bangui.

== Priest ==
He was ordained a priest for the Diocese of Bangassou, on 18 March 2001. On 18 December 2004, when The Holy Father created the Diocese of Alindao, Father Cyr-Nestor Yapaupa was incardinated in the new Catholic see. He served as a priest until 14 May 2012. While a priest, he served in various roles and location, including:

- He accompanied vocational groups from 2001 until 2002.
- Parish Vicar in the Diocese of Bangassou from 2001 until 2004.
- Head of the Diocesan Liturgy Commission from 2003 until 2012
- Diocesan Secretary of Catholic Teaching in the Diocese of Alindao from 2004 until 2012.
- Pastor of the Diocesan Cathedral at Alindao from 2005 until 2012.
- Diocesan Chaplain of the Association of Saint Rita from 2005 until 2012.
- Diocesan Chaplain of the choir groups from 2005 until 2012.
- Vicar General of the Diocese of Alindao from 2006 until 2012.

== Bishop ==
On 14 May 2012, Pope Benedict XVI appointed Reverend Father Cyr-Nestor Yapaupa, previously the Vicar General of the same Catholic diocese, as Coadjutor Bishop of the Diocese of Alindao, Central African Republic. He receceived his episcopal concecration on 22 July 2012, by the hands of Cardinal Fernando Filoni, Cardinal-Deacon of Nostra Signora di Coromoto in San Giovanni di Dio assisted by Jude Thaddeus Okolo, Titular Archbishop of Novica and Edouard Mathos, Bishop of Bambari.

On 19 March 2014, Bishop Peter Marzinkowski, C.S.Sp, the founding local ordinary of Alindao retired, having attained the retirement age for Catholic bishops. Bishop Cyr-Nestor Yapaupa, previously Coadjutor Bishop of the same Catholic diocese succeeded at Alindao. He continues to serve under very severe social and security environments.

== See also ==
- Roman Catholicism in the Central African Republic

== Succession table ==
Catholic Church titles
Preceded by Peter Marzinkowski (18 December 2004 - 19 March 2014)	Bishop of Alindao (since 19 March 2014)	Succeeded by (Incumbent)
Preceded by	Coadjutor Bishop of Alindao (14 May 2012 -19 March 2014)	Succeeded by
