= Freedom of religion in the Central African Republic =

The Constitution provides for freedom of religion, although it prohibits what the Government considers to be religious fundamentalism.

The country has an area of approximately 242,000 square miles (630,000 km^{2}) and a population of 4,369,000. According to the Pew Research Foundation, in 2019, the country was 61% Protestant, 28% Catholic, and 9% Muslim. The remainder of the population practices traditional beliefs (animism), or none at all.

In 2026, the Central African Republic was scored 1 out of 4 for religious freedom by Freedom House. It was noted that multiple insurgencies led by rebel factions in the north, the civil war in neighboring Sudan, and the presence of the Islamist militant group Boko Haram around Lake Chad continue to threaten physical security.

In the same year, Open Doors ranked the country as being the 22nd most difficult place to be a Christian.

The remainder of this article is informed by the US State Dept 2007 report. A later report is available.

== Overview ==
Citizens of the country are mainly Christian. In general, immigrants and foreign nationals in the country who practice a particular religion characterize themselves as Catholic, Protestant, or Muslim.

There were many foreign missionary groups operating in the country. Many missionaries who left the country due to fighting between rebel and government forces in 2002 and 2003 returned to the country and resumed their activities.

== Status of religious freedom ==
=== Legal and policy framework ===
The Constitution provides for freedom of religion, and the Government generally permitted adherents of all religious groups to worship without interference. The Constitution prohibits what the Government considers to be religious fundamentalism or intolerance. The constitutional provision prohibiting religious fundamentalism was widely perceived as targeting Muslims; however, any additional legislation does not support it.

Although witchcraft or sorcery is a criminal offense punishable by execution under the penal code, most sentences are from 1 to 5 years in prison or a fine of up to $1,500 (817,836 CFA francs). No one accused of witchcraft received the death penalty during the reporting period, but numerous individuals were arrested for these practices, often in conjunction with some other offense, such as murder. Accusations of witchcraft appear unrelated to religious practice and are often associated with interpersonal disputes. The Government reinforces societal attitudes about the efficacy of sorcery by arresting and detaining persons accused of witchcraft, often under the guise of protecting the accused from harm by people within their communities.

During a typical trial of someone accused of sorcery, traditional doctors and neighbors are called as witnesses, and cuttings of clothes are submitted as evidence. In the past, the Minister of Justice acknowledged that investigations into allegations of sorcery were difficult. Authorities free most people imprisoned for witchcraft and sorcery offenses for lack of evidence; however, government authorities in May 2007 identified 8–10 inmates as being imprisoned for witchcraft in Bimbo, the women's prison in Bangui.

Religious groups that the Government considered "subversive", a term not specifically defined by the Government, are subject to sanctions by the Ministry of Interior. When imposing sanctions, the Ministry of Interior may decline to register, suspend the operations of, or ban any organization that it deems offensive to public morals or likely to disturb the peace. The Ministry of Interior may also intervene in religious organizations to resolve internal conflicts about property, finances, or leadership within religious groups.

The Government celebrates several Christian holy days as national holidays including Christmas, Easter Monday, Ascension Day, the Monday after Pentecost, and All Saints' Day. The Government does not officially celebrate Islamic holy days; however, Muslims are allowed to take these days off from work. There is no state religion.

Religious groups (except for traditional indigenous religious groups) are required by law to register with the Ministry of Interior. Registration is free and confers official recognition and certain limited benefits, such as customs duty exemption for the importation of vehicles or equipment. The administrative police of the Ministry of Interior monitored groups that failed to register; however, the police did not attempt to impose any penalty on such groups.

Religious organizations and missionary groups are free to proselytize and worship throughout the country.

Students are not compelled to participate in religious education, and they are free to attend any religious program of their choosing. Although the Government does not explicitly prohibit religious instruction in public schools, such instruction is not part of the overall public school curriculum, nor is it common. Religious instruction is permitted without government interference in private schools. Private Catholic schools generally include 1 hour of religious education per week.

The Government grants religious groups 1 day each week, of their choosing, to make free broadcasts on the official radio station. All religious representatives that wish to broadcast on public airwaves are required to pay a fee when covering certain activities or making religious advertisements. There are four religious broadcasting stations—two Protestant, one Catholic, and one Islamic.

The Government continued to take positive steps to promote religious freedom, such as the organizing of interfaith services for the purpose of promoting peace and interfaith dialogue.

=== Restrictions on religious freedom ===
Government policy and practice contributed to the mostly free practice of religion, except for any practice considered subversive or witchcraft related. The Government continued to ban the Unification Church, claiming that it is a subversive organization likely to disturb the peace because of its alleged training of younger church members as paramilitaries. In December 2006 President Bozize ordered security forces to burn several houses belonging to deacons of Kina Baptist Church in Bangui in response to the deacons' burning of a pastor's house following an interpersonal dispute. Security forces arrested two deacons and beat one of them before releasing them.

The Government maintained burdensome legal requirements that restricted the activities of some groups. Two of the churches suspended by the Government in 2003 failed to reopen, unable to prove they had a minimum of one thousand members and church leaders who graduated from what the Government considered high caliber religious schools.

There were no reports of religious prisoners or detainees in the country.

=== Forced religious conversion ===
There were no reports of forced religious conversion, including of minor U.S. citizens who had been abducted or illegally removed from the United States, or of the refusal to allow such citizens to be returned to the United States.

Improvements and Positive Developments in Respect for Religious Freedom

The Government approved the reopening of a Protestant church in Bangui that had been closed by the Government in March 2006 after authorities learned that two factions within the church were planning to fight each other with knives. The church members later reconciled.

== Societal abuses and discrimination ==
Private actors continued to abuse and discriminate against people accused of witchcraft. Although there is widespread belief in the efficacy of sorcery, accusations of witchcraft generally arose from interpersonal disputes, not from specific religious or cultural practices.

Witchcraft is widely understood to encompass attempts to harm others not only by magic but also by covert means of established efficacy such as poisons. Although many traditional indigenous religious groups include or accommodate belief in the efficacy of witchcraft, they generally only approve of harmful witchcraft for defensive or retaliatory purposes. Witchcraft was a common explanation for diseases such as HIV/AIDS.

Government authorities sentenced four residents of Bangui's Miskine suburb to more than 10 years in prison for the 2005 killing of a woman they accused of being a witch. Although courts have tried, convicted, and sentenced some persons for crimes committed against suspected witches in the past, violence against these individuals continued.

== See also ==
- Religion in the Central African Republic
- Human rights in the Central African Republic
- Catholic Church in the Central African Republic
