= Dennis Kofi Agbenyadzi =

Central African Catholic prelate (born 1974)

The Most Reverend Dennis Kofi Agbenyadzi
- Archbishop of Berbérati, Central African Republic
- Church: Catholic Church
- Archdiocese: Roman Catholic Archdiocese of Berbérati
- See: Berbérati
- Appointed: 25 April 2026
- Installed: 25 April 2026
- Other post: Bishop of Berbérati (14 May 2012 - 25 April 2026)

Orders
- Ordination: 12 July 1997
- Consecration: 22 July 2012 by Cardinal Fernando Filoni
- Rank: Archbishop

Personal details
- Born: Dennis Kofi Agbenyadzi; 9 October 1964 (age 62) Kadjebi-Akan, Diocese of Jasikan, Volta Region, Ghana
- Motto: "Deus Caritas Est" (God is Love)

Styles of Dennis Kofi Agbenyadzi
- Reference style: Your Lordship; The Most Reverend
- Spoken style: His Lordship
- Religious style: Bishop

Dennis Kofi Agbenyadzi S.M.A. (born 9 October 1964) is a Ghanaian-born Roman Catholic prelate who was appointed Archbishop of the Roman Catholic Archdiocese of Berbérati, in the Central African Republic on 25 April 2026. Before that, from 14 May 2012 until 25 April 2026, he served as the Bishop of the Diocese of Berbérati. He was appointed bishop by Pope Francis. His consecration took place on 22 July 2012, by the hands of Fernando Cardinal Filoni, Cardinal-Deacon of Nostra Signora di Coromoto in San Giovanni di Dio. On 25 April 2026, Pope Leo XIV elevated the diocese of Berbérati to an archdiocese and appointed the local ordinary, Bishop Dennis Kofi Agbenyadzi, S.M.A., as the founding Archbishop of the new Ecclesiastical Metropolitan Province.

== Background and education ==
He was born on 9 October 1964 in Kadjebi-Akan, Diocese of Jasikan, Volta Region, in Ghana. He carried out his national civil service, then he became a member of the Society of African Missions (S.M.A.). He studied philosophy in the Accra Diocesan Seminary in Accra, Ghana. He studied at an institution in Cavali, Benin for his "year of spirituality". He then carried out his "pastoral apprenticeship" in Bèlèmboké in the Diocese of Berbérati, Central African Republic. He studied theology at the Anyama Interdiocesan Major Seminary in Anyama, Ivory Coast.

== Priest ==
On 29 June 1996, he took his perpetual vows as a member of the Society of African Missions (SMA). He received priestly ordination on 12 July 1997. He served as a priest until 14 May 2012. While a priest, he served in various roles and locations, including:

- Parish vicar in Berbérati from 1997 until 1999.
- Parish priest in Berbérati from 1999 until 2005.
- Director of development projects for the Pygmy peoples from 1999 until 2005.
- Member of the Episcopal Council from 1999 until 2005.
- Head of the management of pharmaceutical products from 1999 until 2005.
- Assistant to the regional superior for the SMA religious order from 1999 until 2005.
- Superior of the Formation House in Bangui from 2006 until 2007.
- Member of the Diocesan Commission for the Pastoral Care of Migrants from 2006 until 2007
- Regional superior of the Fathers of the Society of African Missions from 2007 until 2012.

== Bishop ==
Pope Francis appointed him bishop of the Diocese of Berberati, CAR on 14 May 2012. He received his episcopal consecration on 22 July 2012 at the Bangui Catholic Cathedral, Bangui. The Principal onsecrator was Cardinal Fernando Filoni, Cardinal-Deacon of Nostra Signora di Coromoto in San Giovanni di Dio. He was assisted by Jude Thaddeus Okolo, Titular Archbishop of Novica and Edouard Mathos, Bishop of Bambari.

On 25 April 2026, Pope Leo XIV elevated the Diocese of Berberati to the Archdiocese of Berbérati. The Holy Father appointed Bishop Dennis Kofi Agbenyadzi S.M.A., the local ordinary of the previous diocese as the pioneer Archbishop of the new Ecclesiastical Metropolitan Province.

== See also ==
- Catholic Church in the Central African Republic

== Succession table ==
Catholic Church titles
Preceded by Archdiocese created	Archbishop of Berbérati (since 25 April 2026)	Succeeded by (Incumbent)
Preceded by Agostino Giuseppe Delfino (17 June 1991 - 17 June 2010)	Bishop of Berbérati (14 May 2012 - 25 April 2026)	Succeeded by (Diocese elevated to Archdiocese)
