= Sergio Adolfo Govi =

Italian priest

Sergio Adolfo Govi O.F.M.Cap
- Bishop of Bossangoa
- Church: Catholic Church
- Diocese: Diocese of Bossangoa
- In office: 22 April 1978 – 10 June 1995
- Predecessor: Léon-Toussaint-Jean-Clément Chambon
- Successor: Paulin Pomodimo
- Previous posts: Titular Bishop of Tortibulum (1975-1978); Coadjutor Bishop of Bossangoa (1975-1978)

Orders
- Ordination: 2 April 1960
- Consecration: 26 October 1975 by Bernardin Gantin

Personal details
- Born: 30 June 1934 Ospitaletto, Province of Brescia, Kingdom of Italy
- Died: 31 May 2016 (aged 81)

Sergio Adolfo Govi (30 June 1934 – 31 May 2016) was a Roman Catholic bishop.

Ordained to the priesthood in 1960, Govi served as coadjutor bishop of the Roman Catholic Diocese of Bossangoa, Central African Republic from 1975 to 1978. He then served as bishop of the diocese from 1978 to 1995.
