= Mirosław Gucwa =

Polish-born Central African Roman Catholic bishop (born 1963)

- Church: Catholic Church
- Diocese: Diocese of Bouar
- See: Bouar
- Appointed: 2 December 2017
- Predecessor: Armando Umberto Gianni

Orders
- Ordination: 12 June 1988 by Jerzy Karol Ablewicz
- Consecration: 11 February 2018 by Dieudonné Nzapalainga

Personal details
- Born: 21 November 1963 (age 62) Pisarzowa, Poland
- Motto: Mihi vivere Christus est ("For me to live is Christ")
- Coat of arms

Mirosław Gucwa (born 21 November 1963) is a Polish-born Central African Roman Catholic prelate who has served as the bishop of Bouar in the Central African Republic since 2017. He was a priest of the Diocese of Tarnów in Poland and has spent most of his priestly ministry as a missionary in the Central African Republic.

== Early life and priesthood ==
Gucwa was born on 21 November 1963 in Pisarzowa, in the Diocese of Tarnów, Poland. He attended secondary school in Tarnów and subsequently entered the Major Seminary of Tarnów, where he studied philosophy and theology and obtained a licentiate in theology.

He was ordained a priest on 12 June 1988. From 1988 to 1992 he served as a parish vicar in Grybów. In 1992 he went to the Central African Republic as a missionary, initially serving as pastor of the Sainte Jeanne Antide parish in Bohong in the Diocese of Bouar from 1992 to 1996.

== Missionary ministry ==
In 1996 Gucwa became rector of the minor seminary of Bouar, a position he held until 2005. From 2003 to 2006 he was chancellor of the diocesan curia of Bouar. In 2006 he became vicar general of the diocese.

He also served as pastor of the cathedral parish in Bouar from 2011 to 2014, while working as chaplain to the local prison and hospital and as president of the diocesan Justice and Peace commission.

According to accounts from the Tarnów missionary community, Gucwa was involved in humanitarian and peace-building activities during the conflict in the Central African Republic. He supported efforts to assist local inhabitants, worked for reconciliation between religious communities and was involved in efforts to secure the release of the Polish missionary Mateusz Dziedzic, who had been held by rebels.

== Episcopate ==
On 2 December 2017, Pope Francis appointed Gucwa bishop of Bouar, succeeding Armando Umberto Gianni, O.F.M. Cap., whose resignation from the pastoral government of the diocese was accepted by the pope. At the time of his appointment, Gucwa was serving as vicar general of Bouar.

He received episcopal consecration in the cathedral of Bouar on 11 February 2018 and took possession of the diocese. Andrzej Jeż, bishop of Tarnów, was among the co-consecrators. He chose as his episcopal motto Mihi vivere Christus est, translated as "For me to live is Christ".

As bishop, Gucwa has continued to emphasize missionary activity, peace and interreligious dialogue in the Central African Republic. In September 2018 he participated in a formation session in Rome for bishops serving in mission territories and met Pope Francis.
