= Séoundou =

- Location in Central African Republic
- Coordinates: 4°4′39″N 18°21′12″E
- Country: Central African Republic
- Prefecture: Lobaye
- District: Mbaïki
- Elevation: 1,280 ft (390 m)

Séoundou is a village in Mbaïki district in the Lobaye region in the Central African Republic southwest of the capital, Bangui.

Nearby towns and villages include Sinzongo (8.2 nm), Boali (7.2 nm), Boumbe (6.6 nm), Mbokassa (7.6 nm), Sebala (4.0 nm), Yatimbo (3.0 nm), Ancien Bakani (8.7 nm).
