= Jérôme-Michel-Francis Martin =

Jérôme-Michel-Francis Martin OFMCap (10 June 1941 – 4 December 2009) was the bishop of the Roman Catholic Diocese of Berbérati, Central African Republic.

== Life ==
Jérôme Martin entered the Order of Friars Minor Capuchin and made his vows on 26 June, 1966. He was ordained a priest on 29 June, 1967.

From 1980 to 1987 Martin was Apostolic Administrator in Berbérati. In 1987 Pope John Paul II appointed him Bishop of the Diocese of Berberati in the Central African Republic. He was ordained a bishop on 24 January, 1988, by the Archbishop of Chambéry, Claude Feidt; Co-consecrators were Hubert Marie Pierre Dominique Barbier, then Bishop of Annecy, and Edouard Mathos, then auxiliary bishop in the diocese of Bossangoa.

In 1991, Pope John Paul II accepted Martin's retirement. Martin died on 4 December, 2009. He was buried in the church of La Chapelle.
