= Diocese of Kaga-Bandoro =

Roman Catholic diocese in the Central African Republic

Coordinates: 7°00′02″N 19°10′54″E

Diocese of Kaga-Bandoro Dioecesis Kagiensis-Bandorensis

Location
- Country: Central African Republic
- Metropolitan: Archdiocese of Bangui
- Headquarters: Bangui, Central African Republic

Statistics
- Area: 95,000 km^{2} (37,000 sq mi)
- Population: Total; Catholics: (as of 2023); 327,325; 120,155 (36.7%)
- Parishes: 11

Information
- Denomination: Catholic Church
- Sui iuris church: Latin Church
- Rite: Roman Rite
- Established: 28 June 1997; 29 years ago
- Cathedral: Cathedral of St. Therese of the Child Jesus and the Holy Face in Kaga-Bandoro
- Secular priests: 29 (26 Diocesan, 3 Religious Orders)

Current leadership
- Pope: Leo XIV
- Bishop: Victor Hugo Castillo Matarrita, M.C.C.I.
- Metropolitan Archbishop: Dieudonné Nzapalainga, C.S.Sp.
- Bishops emeritus: Albert Vanbuel, S.D.B.

Map
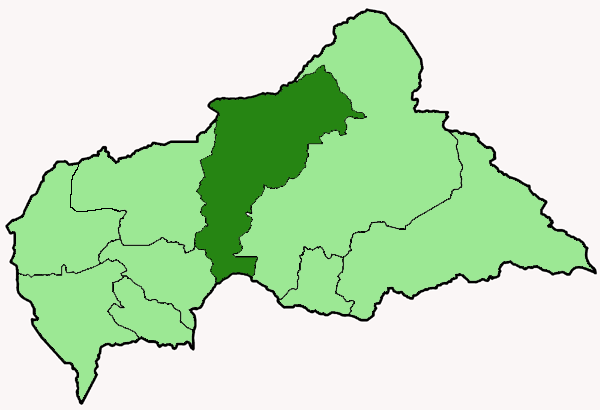

The Roman Catholic Archdiocese of Kaga-Bandoro (Latin: Kagien(sis)-Bandoren(sis)) is a diocese in Kaga-Bandoro in the ecclesiastical province of Bangui in the Central African Republic.

== History ==
The diocese was established on 28 June 1997, from Metropolitan Archdiocese of Bangui. The territory of the diocese was 95,000 km^{2} in extent. In 2023 the area had a reported population of 327,325 people, of whom 120,155 (36.7%) were Catholics. The diocese was to comprise 11 parishes, with 29 priests and 10 sisters.

== Special churches ==
The cathedral is the Cathedral of St. Therese of the Child Jesus and the Holy Face in Kaga-Bandoro.

== Leadership ==
Bishops of Kaga-Bandoro (Roman Rite)

- François-Xavier Yombandje (28 June 1997 – 3 April 2004), appointed Bishop of Bossangoa
- Albert Vanbuel, S.D.B. (16 July 2005 – 27 September 2015), retired
- Zbigniew Tadeusz Kusy, O.F.M. (27 September 2015 – 31 March 2024)
- Victor Hugo Castillo Matarrita, M.C.C.I. (5 September 2024 – Present)

Coadjutor Bishop

- Zbigniew Tadeusz Kusy, O.F.M. (2014-2015)

== See also ==
Roman Catholicism in the Central African Republic
