= Ziendi =

Village in the Central African Republic

- Location in Central African Republic
- Coordinates: 3°24′22″N 15°41′44″E
- Country: Central African Republic
- Prefecture: Sangha-Mbaéré
- Sub-prefecture: Nola
- Commune: Bilolo

Ziendi is a village in Sangha-Mbaéré in the Central African Republic. It is 209 miles (337 km) west of Bangui and 290 miles (467 km) north west of Mbandaka.

== Economy ==
The villagers cultivate cocoa for income.

== Healthcare ==
Ziendi has a private health center.

== Notable people ==
- Paulin Pomodimo, Roman Catholic archbishop
