= Xavier Yombandje =

Central African Roman Catholic bishop

François Xavier Yombandje
- Bishop Emeritus of Bossangoa
- Church: Catholic Church
- Diocese: Diocese of Bossangoa
- In office: 3 April 2004 – 16 May 2009
- Predecessor: Paulin Pomodimo
- Successor: Nestor-Désiré Nongo-Aziagbia
- Previous post: Bishop of Kaga-Bandoro (1997-2004)

Orders
- Ordination: 22 September 1985
- Consecration: 26 October 1997 by Joachim N'Dayen

Personal details
- Born: 9 July 1956 (age 69) Koumra, Moyen-Chari, Colony of Chad, French Equatorial Africa, French Empire

François Xavier Yombandje (born 9 July 1956, in Koumra) is a former Central African Roman Catholic bishop.

Yombandje was born on 9 July 1956, in Koumra, Chad. He was ordained a priest in 1985. In 1997 he became bishop of Kaga-Bandoro and in 2004 of Bossangoa. He was chairman of the Central African Episcopal Conference.

Yombandje resigned from his pastoral duties on 16 May 2009, after a Vatican investigation found that many local priests had violated their vows of chastity, poverty and obedience. Yombandje was also specifically cited for having a common-law wife. A few weeks later the archbishop of Bangui, Paulin Pomodimo, resigned as well.
