= Marcel Grandin =

French Roman Catholic bishop (1885–1947)

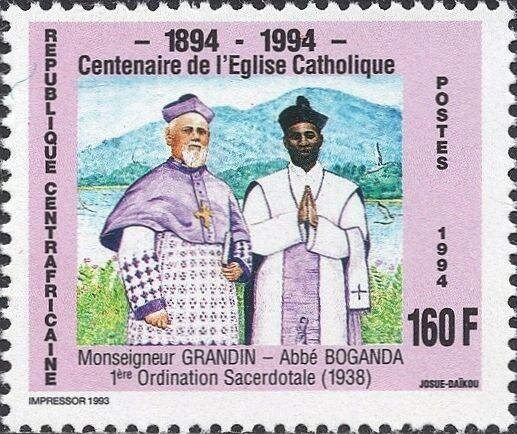
A 1994 Central African stamp depicting the ordination of Father Barthélemy Boganda alongside Monsignor Marcel Grandin.

Marcel-Auguste-Marie Grandin (January 16,1885–August 4, 1947) was a French Roman Catholic bishop.

Born in Beaulandais, Normandy, he entered the Congregation of the Holy Spirit, being ordained a priest in 1912. Assigned to Ubangi-Shari, he was made head of the local Catholic Church in 1928, and appointed bishop of Bangui in 1937.

Grandin played an important role in the religious and political life of Barthélemy Boganda, ordaining him in 1938 and encouraging him to run for the French National Assembly in 1946.

Grandin died in Bangui. Boganda, who had great respect for him, henceforth distanced himself from the church hierarchy.
