= Religion in the Central African Republic =

Religion in the Central African Republic (Pew Research Center 2020)
1. Christianity (90.7%)
2. Islam (6.20%)
3. Other (3.10%)

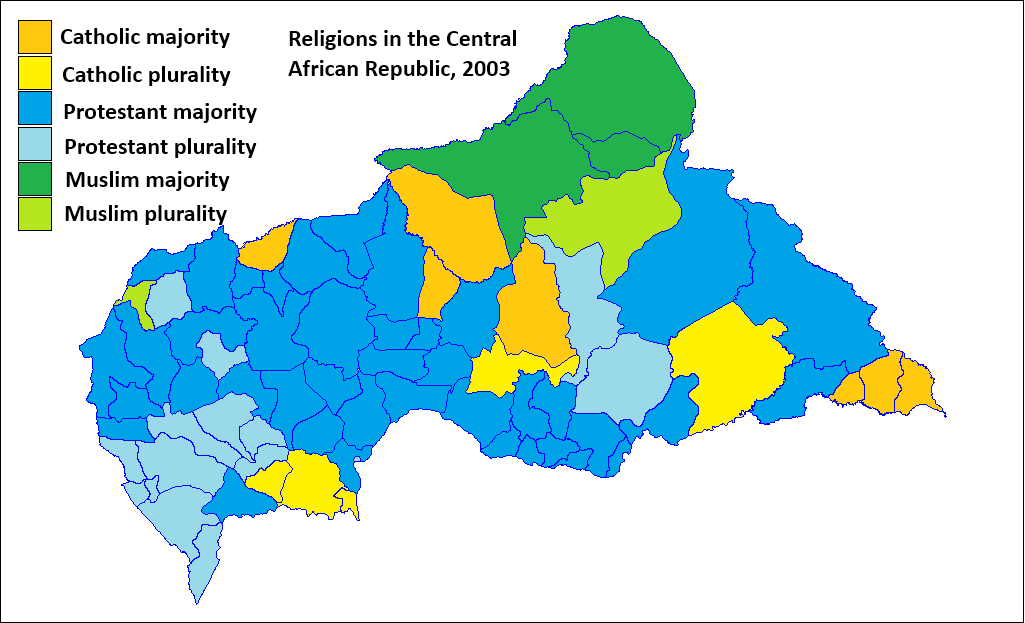
Predominant religion by subprefecture in the Central African Republic, 2003.

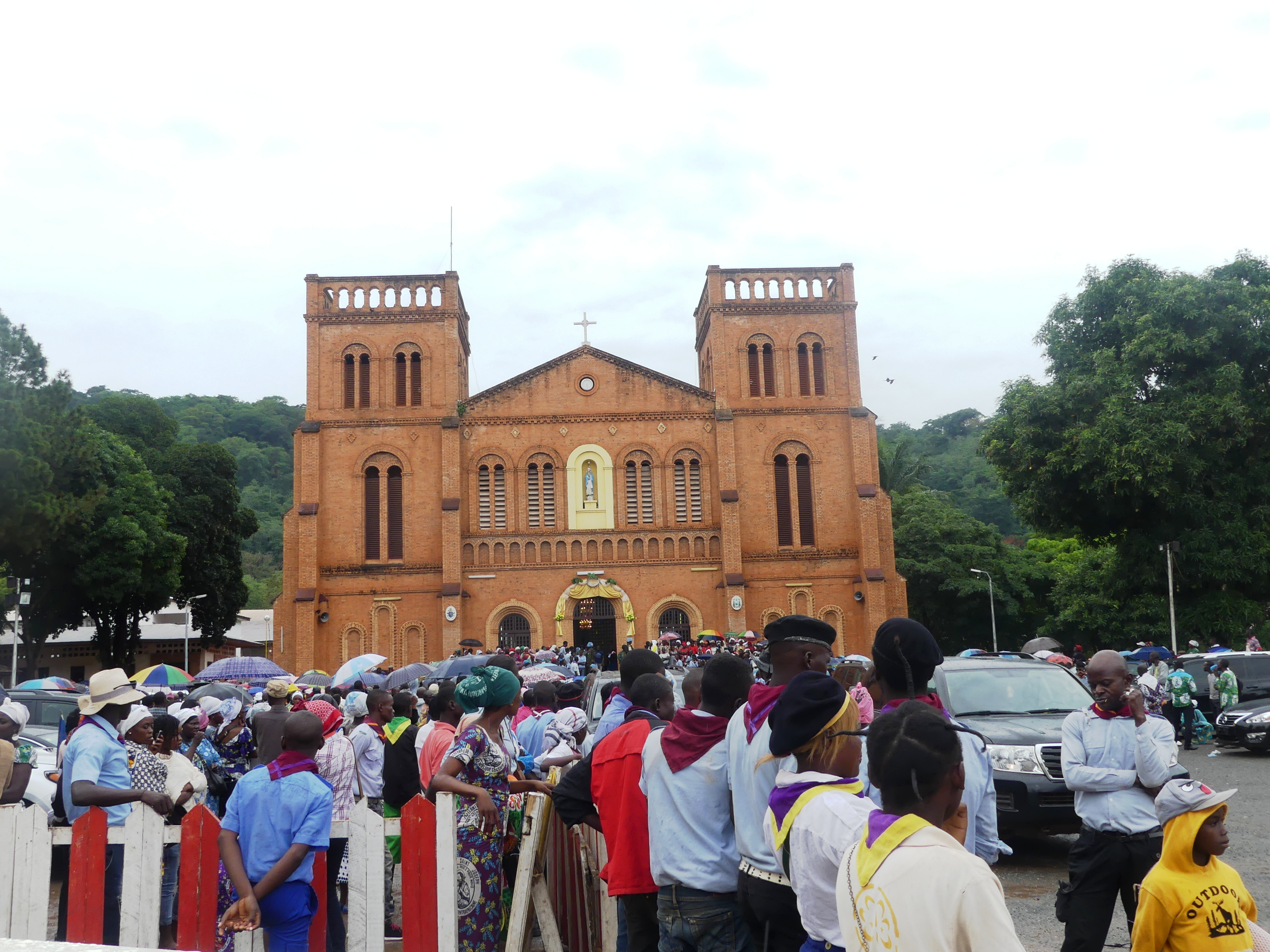
Christian worshippers outside the Bangui Cathedral.

Christianity is the predominant religion in the Central African Republic, with significant minorities adhering to Islam and traditional African religions.

The country is officially secular and freedom of religion is enshrined in its constitution. Christmas and Easter are recognized as public holidays. Conflicts are frequently split along religious lines in the CAR.

== Overview ==
=== Christianity ===
Christianity is practiced by 75–89 percent of the population. According to a 2019 study Protestants outnumber Catholics in the Central African Republic. Accordingly, 61% of the population is Protestant and 28% is Catholic. Some Christians are influenced by animist beliefs and practices.

=== Islam ===
Islam is the second largest religion in the country, practiced by 9–15 percent of the population. The vast majority of Muslims are Malikite Sunni. It is believed that many of these followers incorporate traditional indigenous elements into their faith practices. In 2021, there were around 703,373 refugees from the Central African Republic in bordering countries, with most of them adhering to Islam.

== Demographics ==
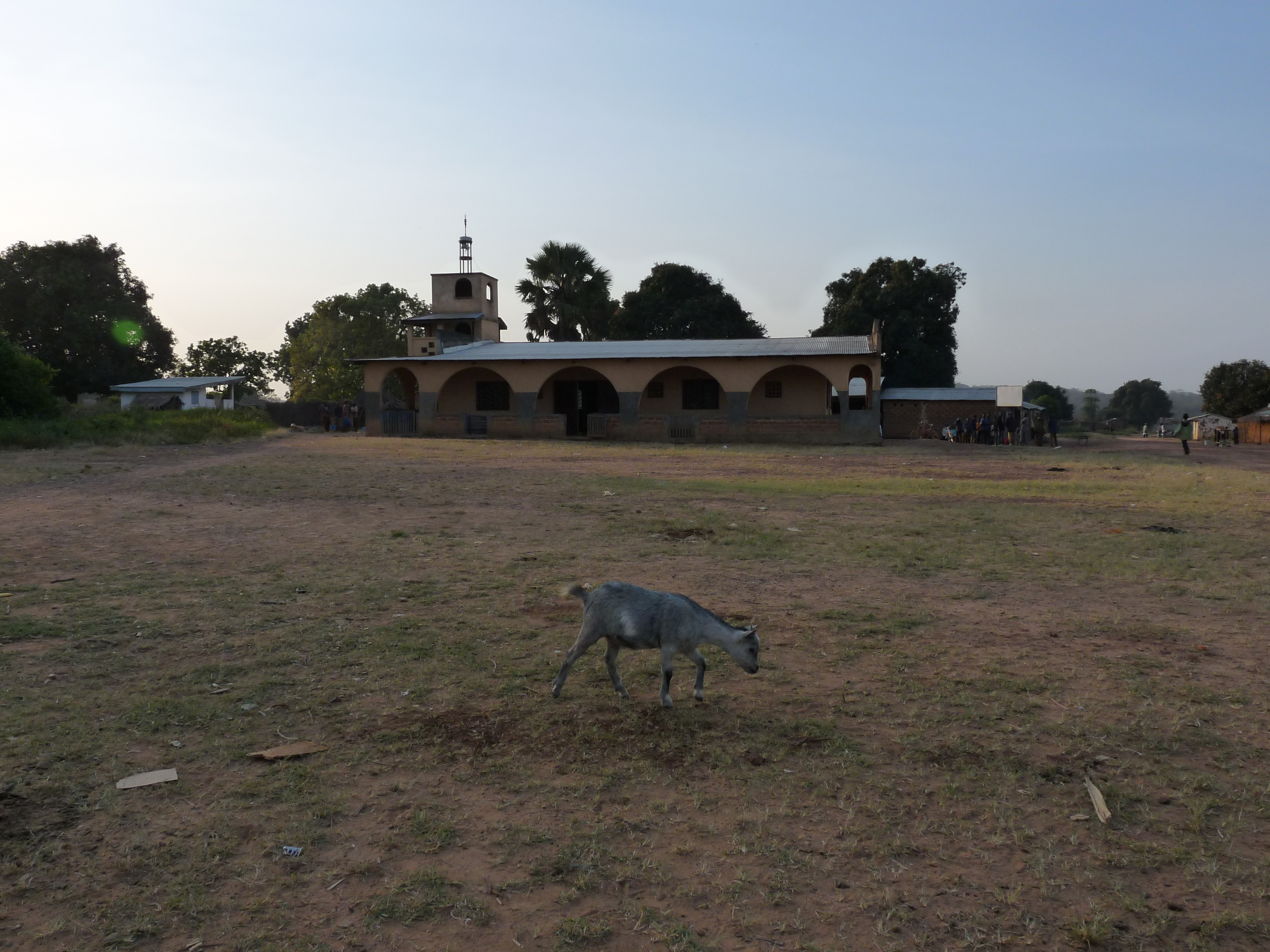
Yéléwa Mosque in the Nana-Mambéré Prefecture.

=== Censuses ===
The last population and housing census in 2003 recorded a population of 3,895,139, of whom 80.3% were Christian, 10.1% Muslim, 4.5% practised other faiths, 3.6% had no religion, and 1.5% chose not to declare their religious affiliation.

Religious affiliation
Religion	2003 census	
Religion	#	%
Christian	3,127,797	80.3
—Protestant	2,002,102	51.4
—Catholic	1,125,695	28.9
Muslim	393,409	10.1
No religion	140,225	3.6
Other	175,281	4.5
Non-Declared	58,427	1.5
Total	3,895,139	100

=== Religious geography ===
Although the Central African Republic government did not release detailed official religious matrix data per prefecture in the last census, Reports from the United States Department of State and spatial studies of religion show consistent distribution patterns based on geographic location.

The following is an estimate of the percentage characteristics and distribution of religion at the prefecture level in the Central African Republic:

Estimates of religious proportions per prefecture in the Central African Republic
Prefecture	Proportion estimation (%)
Bangui	70% Christian (Protestant & Catholic), 20–25% Muslim. The largest Muslim community is in the Third District (PK5 area).
Vakaga	Muslim majority (~75%–85%). The prefecture has the highest Muslim percentage because it borders the Muslim-majority countries of Sudan and Chad. Christian (~15%).
Bamingui-Bangoran	The majority are Muslims (~60%–70%) followed by animists and a Christian minority (~30%).
Haute-Kotto	50%–55% Christian and 35%–45% Muslim. The town of Bria has a significant Muslim population due to the gem trading sector.
Ouham	Absolute Christian majority (~85%). The Muslim population has drastically decreased in rural areas after the 2013 conflict.
Ouham-Pendé	Absolute Christian majority (~85%–90%). Dominated by Protestant denominations (Baptist & Lutheran).
Lim-Pendé	Absolute Christian majority (~90%). A area with a strong Christian Gbaya ethnic base.
Ouham-Fafa	Absolute Christian majority (~75%). Christian enclave under the northern transition zone.
Nana-Grébizi	Majority Christian (~60%), with a Muslim minority (~35%) along the transhumance trade routes.
Kémo	Absolute Christian majority (~85%).
Nana-Mambéré	Absolute Christian majority (~90%–95%). Bouar is known as the historical center of Christian missionary spread in the RCA.
Mambéré-Kadéï	Absolute Christian majority (~85%). The minority Muslim community is concentrated in the commercial district of Carnot.
Mambéré	Absolute Christian majority (~85%–90%).
Sangha-Mbaéré	The majority are Christians (~70%), followed by adherents of traditional/animist beliefs (~25%).
Lobaye	Absolute Christian majority (~85%). This southern region has a very strong Roman Catholic influence.
Ombella-M'Poko	Majority Christian (~65%–70%). Buffer zone around the capital Bangui.
Basse-Kotto	Absolute Christian majority (~85%).
Ouaka	Majority Christian (~65%–70%). The town of Bambari is a demographic meeting point with a significant Muslim population (~25%–30%).
Mbomou	Majority Christian (~65%). It is the base of a large Roman Catholic diocese in the eastern region. There is a sizable indigenous Muslim population, mainly centered in the town of Bangassou (~30%).
Haut-Mbomou	The majority are Christian (~80%), with strong syncretism of local traditional beliefs (Zande ethnicity).

== Freedom of religion ==
In 2026, the country scored 1 out of 4 for religious freedom according to Freedom House.

== See also ==
- Central African Republic conflict – A sectarian civil conflict
- Demographics of the Central African Republic
- Roman Catholicism in the Central African Republic
