= Human rights in the Central African Republic =

The Central African Republic, which the United Nations High Commissioner has described as undergoing "the most neglected crisis in the world", has an extremely poor human rights record. It has been designated 'Not Free' by Freedom House from 1972 to 1990, in 2002 and 2003, and from 2014 to the present day. It was rated 'Partly Free' from 1991 to 2001 and from 2004 to 2013. On the United Nations Human Development Index, it ranks 179 out of 187 countries. Between 1988 and 2008, life expectancy decreased from 49 years to 47.7 years.

According to the U.S. State Department, major human rights abuses occur in the country. These include extrajudicial executions by security forces; the torture, beating and rape of suspects and prisoners; impunity, particularly among the armed forces; harsh and life-threatening conditions in prisons and detention centers; arbitrary arrest and detention, prolonged pretrial detention and denial of fair trials; occasional intimidation and restrictions on the press; restrictions on freedom of movement; official corruption; and restrictions on workers' rights.

The State Department report also cites widespread, and often fatal, mob violence; the prevalence of female genital mutilation; discrimination against women and Pygmies; trafficking in persons; forced labor; and child labor. Freedom of movement is limited in the northern part of the country "because of actions by state security forces, armed bandits, and other nonstate armed entities" and thanks to fighting between government and anti-government forces, many persons have been internally displaced.

== Recent reports on human rights abuses ==
In recent years, perhaps the major impediment to human rights in the Central African Republic has been the persistence of widespread armed struggle in the country between government forces and rebel groups and in some cases, between warring rebel groups. In October 2008, a report by the human-rights section of the UN Peacebuilding Support Office in the country, known as BONUCA, described "a serious worsening of the security situation in the north of the country where Government forces, rebels and highway bandits have been active, all of whom committed atrocities" and stated that "[e]xtrajudicial killings, torture and arbitrary arrests, mostly attributed to the defence and security forces and encouraged by a culture of impunity, have contributed to a considerable deterioration in human rights".

The BONUCA report further noted that government forces "blithely violate the laws of war. In their operations against rebels or bandits they make no distinction between those who have taken up arms and civilians… In reprisal raids, the military burn houses, execute people rightly or wrongly accused of complicity with rebels or bandits". According to BONUCA, soldiers in the town of Bouar displayed "severed heads that they claimed belonged to highway bandits they had shot", that bandits "torture travellers, plunder local residents, and kidnap women and children for ransom", that the rebel group called Armée populaire pour la restauration de la democratie (APRD) "prevents some residents from moving around" and that armed men probably belonging to the Lord's Resistance Army (LRA) had "kidnapped 150 people, including 55 children and physically abused them". On the other hand, BONUCA said that the government had been very cooperative with human-rights groups.

In February 2010, the UN High Commissioner for Human Rights, Navi Pillay, said that impunity for human-rights abuses is one of the Central African Republic's major challenges. Citing "summary executions, enforced disappearances, illegal arrests, and detention", she called for "strenuous efforts... ...to put an end to these extremely serious abuses of power".

An Amnesty International report on developments in the country during 2011 provided an overview of the various rebel groups that represented a challenge to government forces, observing that the northwestern part of the country "was under the effective control of the Popular Army for the Restoration of Democracy (APRD), an armed group which had signed a peace agreement with the government", while "the Lord’s Resistance Army (LRA) increased the number and severity of its attacks" in the southeast and east. In July 2011, the Union of Democratic Forces for Unity (UFDR) attacked and occupied the north-eastern town of Sam Ouandja, "purportedly in retaliation for attacks on its positions by the Convention of Patriots for Justice and Peace (CPJP)... . Between June and August, three CPJP factions signed peace agreements with the government, although their fighters continued to be armed". Amnesty International noted that as a result of all these hostilities, a "significant proportion of the CAR was beyond the control of the government", with over 200,000 persons being internally displaced and about 200,000 more living as refugees in neighboring countries.

On 10 December 2012, forces of the Seleka coalition, consisting mostly of members of APRD and UFDR, launched an offensive against government forces, and on 11 January 2013 a peace agreement was signed in which the parties agreed to hold new parliamentary elections. In January 2013, the European Parliament expressed concern about the situation, calling on the parties to respect the ceasefire and condemning "all attempts to take power by force". The European Parliament singled out the use of child soldiers in the ongoing conflicts as a reason for special concern. The International Rescue Committee was obliged to close its offices in the country as a result of the December violence, but reopened them in January, pointing out that the situation nonetheless remained "tense... ...as peace talks between the government, the rebel alliance and opposition parties begin in Gabon".

A 10 January 2013 report by the International Federation of Human Rights (FIDH) called on all parties in the country "to end human rights violations, to protect civilians, and for the negotiation and establishment of better governance for the Central African Republic, in particular for a genuine fight against impunity for the authors of the most serious crimes". An 11 January 2013 report by the International Red Cross indicated that despite ongoing talks in Libreville, residents of the towns of Sibut and Damara, on the front line of the conflict, had "fled their homes for fear of armed violence" and "set up makeshift shelters in the bush, where they’re at the mercy of malaria-carrying mosquitoes". On the same date, the UN Refugee Agency issued a statement saying that it feared the possible consequences of a resumption of hostilities, noting that it had "received reports of thousands of people being displaced in the north and east since the start of the Séléka advance about a month ago".

On 18 January 2013, Louisa Lombard of the New York Times described the CAR as a longtime "laboratory for international peace-building initiatives" that have continually failed. It noted that while the UN had repeatedly "promoted 'D.D.R.' programs – disarmament, demobilization and reintegration – to help armed groups rejoin civilian communities", the DDR approach had "ended up sidelining those it was meant to benefit and creating incentives for the disenchanted to take up arms", because the programs "assume that the governments they assist function like Max Weber’s ideal state – maintaining a monopoly on the use of force, providing services to all citizens".

In reality, wrote Lombard, the CAR's government "has lived off kickbacks while leaving rural authorities mostly to their own devices". She charged that the DDR Steering Committee, founded in 2009 under UN and other international auspices, had spent a great deal of time "talking and dithering", but had accomplished nothing, even as "the members of the committee, as well as foreign staffers, had pocketed comfortable salaries". Lombard lamented the fact that after the December 2012 rise of the Seleka coalition, "international actors still see D.D.R. as a necessary element of the peacemaking toolkit".

On 24 June 2014, in a report, the International Federation of Human Rights (FIDH) said "war crimes and crimes against humanity continued to be committed as the conflict of impunity raged on" in the CAR.

=== Genocide warnings ===
In November 2013, the UN warned the country was at risk of spiralling into genocide and France described the country as "...on the verge of genocide." The increasing violence is largely from reprisal attacks on civilians from Seleka's mainly Muslim fighters and Christian militias called "anti-balaka", meaning 'anti-machete' or 'anti-sword'. Christians make up half the population and Muslims 15 percent, according to the CIA World Factbook. As many Christians have sedentary lifestyles and many Muslims are nomadic, claims to the land are yet another dimension of the tensions.

== Historical background ==
The Central African Republic won independence from France in 1960, after which there ensued what the International Rescue Committee has called "decades of misrule and lawlessness" and what the Human Rights Center at Berkeley Law has described as "decades of political instability, state fragility, mismanagement, and a series of armed conflicts....Many countries around the world are locked in a cycle of poverty, conflict, and destruction. Few, however, have received as little attention as the Central African Republic (CAR)." The nation's modern history has been marked by armed struggle between government forces and various rebel groups, often more than one at the same time, and by numerous coups and coup attempts.

David Dacko, who established a one-party state not long after independence, was overthrown in a 1965 coup by Colonel Jean-Bédel Bokassa, who named himself President for Life in 1972 and Emperor in 1976. Coups in 1979 and 1981 led to rule by a military junta; free elections were held in 1993, and in 2003 General Francois Bozizé seized power. Two years later, he was chosen President in elections that were generally considered free and fair. During his years in power, his regime has been threatened by successive waves of rebellion by a number of different rebel organizations. His term was supposed to end on June 11, 2010, but on May 10 of that year the members of the National Assembly passed a constitutional amendment extending his term as well as their own. On July 30, 2010, Bozizé decreed the first round of presidential and legislative elections would occur in January 2011. The elections did indeed take place in January, and Bozizé was re-elected.

== Human-rights organizations ==
Human-rights groups are able to operate in the Central African Republic with few official restrictions, but the government does not tend to be responsive to their concerns. Domestic human-rights NGOs limit their operations almost exclusively to the capital. Some NGOs have questioned the neutrality of the country's only officially recognized NGO umbrella group, the Inter-NGO Council in CAR (CIONGCA), which is run by a kinsman of the president. Among the active and effective local human-rights groups are the LCDH (Ligue Centrafricaine des Droits de l'Homme), the OCDH (Office centrafricain des Droits de l'Homme), the ACAT (l'Action des Chrétiens pour l'Abolition de la Torture), and AWJ (Association of Women Jurists). Although international organizations are permitted to operate without interference, they are often robbed by anti-government forces on rural roads. Because of the high degree of insecurity in some parts of the Central African Republic, some international human-rights groups have closed their offices in the country.

== High Commissioner for Human Rights and Good Governance ==
The Office of the High Commissioner for Human Rights and Good Governance is charged with investigating human-rights violations by the government, but is understaffed and underfunded, and thus functions only in Bangui. Critics say that it is more of a government mouthpiece than a human-rights office. There is also a human-rights commission in the National Assembly, but it is very underfunded and its autonomy is in doubt.

== Basic rights ==
Under the constitution of the Central African Republic, all human beings are equal without regard to wealth, race, disability, language, or sex. Still, these provisions are not effectively enforced, and there is considerable discrimination.

The police are ineffective, underfunded, and erratically paid, and public lack of confidence in them often leads to mob violence against suspects. It is possible to file complaints against police officers for abuse, but the prosecutor's staff is ill-equipped to handle the volume of complaints. While BINUCA cooperates with human rights organizations, it has been criticized for not dealing properly with abuses within its ranks. Although warrantless searches of homes are illegal, they occur. During operations against anti-government forces, the military has burned houses and killed villagers accused of aiding rebels, and the anti-government forces have taken civilians hostage and extorted money from their relatives.

The country's constitution and laws guarantee freedom of speech and the press, but in practice threats and intimidation are used to limit criticism of the government. The government has been charged with harassing journalists and tapping their phones. Newspapers criticize the president, but are not widely available outside the capital, thanks mainly to the lack of a functioning postal service. The country's low literacy rate limits their audience as well. Privately owned domestic radio stations tend to avoid covering news stories that might draw unwelcome government attention, although international broadcasters such as Radio France Internationale, which have no such pressure on them, can also be picked up by listeners in the country.

Television in the Central African Republic is a state monopoly, with its news coverage generally skewed in the government's favor. The High Council for Communications (HCC), which is charged with granting publication and broadcast licenses and protecting freedom of expression, is purportedly independent, but is partly government-appointed and is said to be under government control. The effectiveness of the news media is weakened by their financial problems, professional deficiencies, and a lack of access to state information. Reporters for privately owned media are not permitted to cover some official events and often must rely on press releases.

In 2010, a camerawoman was beaten, robbed, and raped in the presence of her children and husband, but no one was arrested. Some senior officials have threatened journalists who have been critical of the government. Many journalists practice self-censorship out of fear of government reprisal. Since 2005 there has been no official censorship and no imprisonment for defamation, though libel or slander still carries a fine of up to eight million CFA francs ($16,000). It is illegal to disseminate material deemed to be "misogynist." Internet use is not restricted or monitored, although only a tiny minority of persons in the country have Internet access.

Although the right of assembly is guaranteed in the Constitution, it is sometimes restricted, with organizers of public meetings required to register 48 hours ahead. Political meetings require government approval and may not be held in schools or churches. The Constitution also guarantees freedom of association, although all associations must apply for registrations, which are usually granted without delay.

The Constitution of the Central African Republic protects, and the government generally respects, religious freedom, and prohibits religious prejudice. Some societal discrimination, however, exists in the country, which is 51 percent Protestant, 29 percent Roman Catholic, and 15 percent Muslim, with a large number of persons practicing animism. Witchcraft, which until recently was a capital crime, is now punishable by up to 10 years in prison and a fine. It is up to judges' discretion to decide whether or not a defendant "behaves like a witch." Non-indigenous religious groups must register with authorities and receive government approval to operate must have over 1000 members and must have leaders whose theological training the state accepts as legitimate. Religious groups are entitled to produce weekly free broadcasts on the official radio station.

Freedom of movement within the country, foreign travel, emigration, and repatriation are guaranteed by the Constitution, but the first two are restricted in practice, with officials demanding bribes at checkpoints. Extortion at illegal road barriers discourages commerce and travel, thus seriously crippling the nation's economy. Freedom of movement is also difficult in conflict zones. Foreigners, other than diplomats, must obtain exit visas to leave the country, and this may necessitate proving that they do not owe money to the government.

Government forces frequently commit extra-judicial killing. There are many armed bandits and anti-government groups who also kill and kidnap civilians, as well as those who kill individuals whom they suspect of being sorcerers or witches. Torture is forbidden by the Constitution but the torture of suspects, detainees, and prisoners is common. Anti-government forces are also responsible for a great deal of abuse. Soldiers and other government forces rape civilians. Corruption is illegal, but the laws against it are not effectively enforced, and the World Bank has described government corruption as a major problem in the country. Public funds are routinely misappropriated.

== Women's rights ==
Rape is illegal, but spousal rape is not. There is no minimum sentence for rape, and the law against it is not effectively enforced. In 2010, UN High Commissioner for Human Rights Pillay called for urgent action in response to sexual violence against women, which is pervasive. One in seven women interviewed for a 2009 study reported having been raped during the previous year, and the researchers felt they had reason to believe that the true incidence of rape was even higher. Twenty-two percent of women surveyed said that they had been seriously beaten by a member of their household. Sexual harassment is illegal, and common, but it is not efficiently combatted, and there is no set penalty. While women enjoy equal inheritance and property rights under civil law, they are often subject to discriminatory customary laws, especially in rural areas.

Women are subject to economic and social discrimination. Single women are not considered heads of households, and are often denied family subsidies to which they are supposedly entitled. They are also denied equal access to education and jobs. Divorce rights are equitable, however. Many women, especially those who are very old and without families, are accused of being witches. In 2010, UN High Commissioner for Human Rights Pillay expressed concern about women being accused of, arrested for, and/or attacked by mobs for being witches. A 2003 government-sponsored national dialogue proposed that women should hold 35 percent of posts in government ministries and parties, but this goal has not been realized.

== Children's rights ==
Children born in the country or to parents who are citizens of it are entitled to citizenship. About half of children are not registered, which can result in denial of access to education or other services. Education is obligatory until age 15. Tuition is free, but books, supplies, transportation, and insurance are not. Girls are denied equal access to primary schooling, and tend to drop out early owing to pressure to marry and have children. Few Ba'aka (Pygmies) go to primary school; the government makes no effort to change this. Child abuse is illegal but widespread, as is FGM. Although the legal minimum age for civil marriage is 18, sixty-one percent of girls marry before 18. There are no laws against statutory rape or child pornography. Child labor is common, much of it forced. Children are used as soldiers, with reports of children as young as 12 serving in anti-government forces.

There are over 6000 street children between ages 5 and 18. "Many experts believed that HIV/AIDS and a belief in sorcery, particularly in rural areas, contributed to the large number of street children," reported the U.S. State Department in 2011. "An estimated 300,000 children had lost one or both parents to HIV/AIDS, and children accused of sorcery (often reportedly in connection to HIV/AIDS-related deaths in their neighborhoods) often were expelled from their households and were sometimes subjected to societal violence." The Central African Republic is not a party to the 1980 Hague Convention on the Civil Aspects of International Child Abduction. Many anti-government armed groups kidnap children and hold them for ransom. Some children are also forced to work as sex slaves, as porters carrying stolen goods for bandits, or as field hands and mine workers (especially in diamond mining).

In January 2013, UNICEF called on the Central African Republic to "stop child recruitment by rebel groups and pro-government militias," noting recent reports that such groups were in the process of recruiting children. Even before the latest eruption of violence in December, UNICEF indicated, "about 2,500 children – both girls and boys – were associated with multiple armed groups, including self-defence groups, in CAR." UNICEF further observed that "more than 300,000 children have already been affected by the violence in CAR and its consequences, including through recruitment, family separation, sexual violence, forced displacement and having limited access to education and health facilities."

== Rights of refugees and asylum seekers ==
The Central African Republic has a system for helping refugees, and in practice it protects them from being returned to countries where their lives or freedom would be endangered for various reasons. Refugees are accepted without screening, and the government cooperates with the UNHCR and other groups, among them Doctors without Borders, Caritas, International Medical Corps, and the NGO Cooperazione Internazionale (COOPI), to aid refugees.

== Minority rights ==
Violence against the Mbororo is widespread, and they sometimes have difficulty securing government services. The Ba'Aka (Pygmies), who make up 1–2 percent of the population, are not represented in the government and have no political power. Societal discrimination against the Ba'Aka is significant, and the government does little to prevent it. They are not given identity cards, and are thus denied certain rights and services. Some of the Ba'Aka are effectively slaves, and all of them are essentially second-class citizens.

== Disabled people's rights ==
Discrimination against disabled persons is illegal, and a certain percentage of civil-service members and employees in large firms must be disabled. Societal discrimination is not a problem, but accessibility to buildings is not mandated. Most disabilities in the country are a result of polio.

== LGBT rights ==
Public homosexual behavior is punishable by up to two years in prison and a fine, but the government does not seem to target gays.

== HIV/AIDS rights ==
Persons with HIV/AIDS are the objects of discrimination, but this has decreased thanks largely to efforts by UN agencies and NGOs to increase awareness.

== Rights of persons under arrest ==
The law forbids arbitrary arrest and detention and provides for prompt judicial recourse in the case of such irregularities; but these provisions are often ignored, and informed observers suggest that arbitrary arrest is "the most common human rights abuse committed by security forces" in 2010. There are certain deadlines within which detainees must be informed of charges and brought before a judge, but in practice these deadlines are often not respected. The government is supposed to provide lawyers to indigent defendants, and there is a possibility of bail, and these provisions are generally respected. Persons accused of crimes against state security are subject to more stringent guidelines. Many persons are arrested and charged with witchcraft, which is a capital offense. In later 2010, prison officials in Bangui said that about 18 percent of females in detention had been arrested for witchcraft.

Extensive pretrial detention is a major problem. Pretrial detainees amount to about 67 percent of Ngaragba Central Prison's population in late 2010 and about 63 percent of Bimbo Central Prison's population. Although most detainees are informed promptly of the charges against them, many wait for months before being brought before a judge, and some are kept in prison for years without trial because of bureaucratic problems. The torture of criminal suspects is common and is not punished. Among the forms of torture employed by police is "le cafe," which involves beating of the soles of a person's feet with a baton or stick and then forcing that person to walk.

== Rights of persons on trial ==
The Central African Republic's Constitution guarantees an independent judiciary, but the courts are susceptible to the influence of the executive branch. UN High Commissioner for Human Rights Pillay has expressed concerns about this in 2010, although she praised the National Assembly's revision of legislation that would improve judicial independence and strengthen efforts to right human-rights abuses.

Inefficiency, incompetence, delayed salary payments, and a lack of resources are all major judicial problems. With only 38 courthouses and 124 magistrates in the country, many citizens lack easy access to the civil judicial system, as a result of which traditional family and village courts continue to play a major role. The inefficiency of courts also leads people to take the law into their own hands, holding local tribunals, appealing to local chiefs, and engaging in mob justice, especially in cases involving persons accused of witchcraft.

Criminal trials are by jury, and defendants enjoy such rights as the presumption of innocence, a public trial, the right to be present, to see and present evidence, to have a public defender, and to appeal. The government generally respects these rights, and does provide counsel for defendants who cannot afford a lawyer of their own, but limited government resources often result in delay in providing attorneys, and Ba'Aka (Pygmies) are often subject to unfair trials. The right to a fair trial is often compromised by judicial corruption, with lawyers paying judges for favorable verdicts. Cases of witchcraft are tried frequently.

== Rights of prisoners ==
Prison conditions in the Central African Republic are described by the U.S. State Department as "extremely harsh and, in some cases, life-threatening," with prisons outside the capital "even worse" than those in it. Inmates are subject to torture and to other types of cruel and degrading treatment. Sanitation, ventilation, lighting, and water supplies are substandard, as is medical care. Overcrowding is a major problem.

Families of prisoners generally need to supply food to supplement the inadequate rations supplied by the prisons, and some prisons outside the capital supply no food to inmates and demand bribes to hand over food to the inmates from the latter's families. Inmates are allowed visitors and permitted to worship, although visitors must often pay bribes. Prisoners are often forced to do labor without pay. In some prisons, men and women are held together, as are adults and juveniles, and pretrial detainees are routinely held together with convicts.

Detention centers are plagued by even worse problems than prisons, though of essentially the same kinds. Fair Trials International has referred to the country's "appalling human rights record including harsh and life-threatening conditions in its detention centres." According to the U.S. State Department, "Bangui's police detention centers consisted of overcrowded cells with very little light and leaky buckets for toilets." Medicine is not available, and inmates with infectious diseases are not separated from others. Instead of beds, suspects usually sleep on cement or dirt floors. Guards demand bribes for water, food, showers, and visits. One detention center has no windows or toilet; at another facility, inmates sleep chained together. Prison visits by human-rights observers are restricted, denied, or delayed for weeks or months, although the International Committee of the Red Cross has unlimited access to prisoners.

== Employees' rights ==
All workers, except for high-level government employees and security forces, may join unions, strike, and bargain collectively. Forced labor is illegal, but this prohibition is not effectively enforced. Women and children are forced to work on farms, in mining, restaurants, and other venues, and are also subject to sexual exploitation. Ba'Aka adults and children are often compelled to work on farms and elsewhere and are frequently treated as slaves.

Almost half of children in the country between ages 5 and 14 are employed, some of them in mines. Although it is illegal to employ children in mines, this prohibition is not enforced. Many of the 3000 or so street children in Bangui work as street vendors. Anti-government forces use child soldiers, and displaced children work long hours in fields under conditions of extreme heat.

There are various minimum wages in the formal sector, depending on the kind of word involved. The non-formal sector is not subject to minimum-wage regulations. In any event, the minimum wage is not sufficient to provide a decent standard of living. There are standard work weeks and various official labor standards and health and safety regulations, but they are not enforced.

== Freedom of speech ==
Freedom of speech is addressed in the constitution; however, there have been incidents of government intimidation with the intent to limit media criticism. A report by the International Research & Exchanges Board's media sustainability index noted that 'the country minimally met objectives, with segments of the legal system and government opposed to a free media system."

== Historical situation ==
The chart shows the CAR's ratings since 1972 in the Freedom in the World reports, published annually by Freedom House. A rating of 1 is "free"; 7, "not free".^{1}

Historical ratings

Year	Political Rights	Civil Liberties	Status	Head of State^{2}
1972	7	7	Not Free	Jean-Bédel Bokassa
1973	7	7	Not Free	Jean-Bédel Bokassa
1974	7	7	Not Free	Jean-Bédel Bokassa
1975	7	7	Not Free	Jean-Bédel Bokassa
1976	7	7	Not Free	Jean-Bédel Bokassa
1977	7	7	Not Free	Jean-Bédel Bokassa
1978	7	7	Not Free	Jean-Bédel Bokassa
1979	7	6	Not Free	Jean-Bédel Bokassa
1980	7	5	Not Free	David Dacko
1981	7	5	Not Free	David Dacko
1982^{3}	7	5	Not Free	André Kolingba
1983	7	5	Not Free	André Kolingba
1984	7	6	Not Free	André Kolingba
1985	7	6	Not Free	André Kolingba
1986	7	6	Not Free	André Kolingba
1987	6	6	Not Free	André Kolingba
1988	6	6	Not Free	André Kolingba
1989	6	6	Not Free	André Kolingba
1990	6	5	Not Free	André Kolingba
1991	6	5	Partly Free	André Kolingba
1992	6	5	Partly Free	André Kolingba
1993	3	4	Partly Free	André Kolingba
1994	3	4	Partly Free	Ange-Félix Patassé
1995	3	4	Partly Free	Ange-Félix Patassé
1996	3	5	Partly Free	Ange-Félix Patassé
1997	3	5	Partly Free	Ange-Félix Patassé
1998	3	4	Partly Free	Ange-Félix Patassé
1999	3	4	Partly Free	Ange-Félix Patassé
2000	3	4	Partly Free	Ange-Félix Patassé
2001	5	5	Partly Free	Ange-Félix Patassé
2002	5	5	Partly Free	Ange-Félix Patassé
2003	7	5	Not Free	Ange-Félix Patassé
2004	6	5	Not Free	François Bozizé
2005	5	4	Partly Free	François Bozizé
2006	5	4	Partly Free	François Bozizé
2007	5	5	Partly Free	François Bozizé
2008	5	5	Partly Free	François Bozizé
2009	5	5	Partly Free	François Bozizé
2010	5	5	Partly Free	François Bozizé
2011	5	5	Partly Free	François Bozizé

== International treaties ==
The CAR's stances on international human rights treaties are as follows:

International treaties

Treaty	Organization	Introduced	Signed	Ratified
Convention on the Prevention and Punishment of the Crime of Genocide	United Nations	1948	-	-
International Convention on the Elimination of All Forms of Racial Discrimination	United Nations	1966	1966	1971
International Covenant on Economic, Social and Cultural Rights	United Nations	1966	-	1981
International Covenant on Civil and Political Rights	United Nations	1966	-	1981
First Optional Protocol to the International Covenant on Civil and Political Rights	United Nations	1966	-	1981
Convention on the Non-Applicability of Statutory Limitations to War Crimes and Crimes Against Humanity	United Nations	1968	-	-
International Convention on the Suppression and Punishment of the Crime of Apartheid	United Nations	1973	-	1981
Convention on the Elimination of All Forms of Discrimination against Women	United Nations	1979	-	1991
Convention against Torture and Other Cruel, Inhuman or Degrading Treatment or Punishment	United Nations	1984	-	-
Convention on the Rights of the Child	United Nations	1989	1990	1992
Second Optional Protocol to the International Covenant on Civil and Political Rights, aiming at the abolition of the death penalty	United Nations	1989	-	-
International Convention on the Protection of the Rights of All Migrant Workers and Members of Their Families	United Nations	1990	-	-
Optional Protocol to the Convention on the Elimination of All Forms of Discrimination against Women	United Nations	1999	-	-
Optional Protocol to the Convention on the Rights of the Child on the Involvement of Children in Armed Conflict	United Nations	2000	2010	-
Optional Protocol to the Convention on the Rights of the Child on the Sale of Children, Child Prostitution and Child Pornography	United Nations	2000	2010	-
Convention on the Rights of Persons with Disabilities	United Nations	2006	2007	-
Optional Protocol to the Convention on the Rights of Persons with Disabilities	United Nations	2006	2007	-
International Convention for the Protection of All Persons from Enforced Disappearance	United Nations	2006	-	-
Optional Protocol to the International Covenant on Economic, Social and Cultural Rights	United Nations	2008	-	-
Optional Protocol to the Convention on the Rights of the Child on a Communications Procedure	United Nations	2011	-	-

== See also ==
- Freedom of religion in the Central African Republic
- Human trafficking in the Central African Republic
- Internet censorship and surveillance in the Central African Republic
- LGBT rights in the Central African Republic
- Politics of the Central African Republic

== Notes ==
1.Note that the "Year" signifies the "Year covered". Therefore the information for the year marked 2008 is from the report published in 2009, and so on.
2.As of January 1.
3.The 1982 report covers the year 1981 and the first half of 1982, and the following 1984 report covers the second half of 1982 and the whole of 1983. In the interest of simplicity, these two aberrant "year and a half" reports have been split into three year-long reports through interpolation.
