= Diocese of Mbaïki =

Roman Catholic diocese in the Central African Republic

Coordinates: 3.8788°N 18.0048°E

Diocese of Mbaïki Dioecesis Mbaikiensis

Location
- Country: Central African Republic
- Metropolitan: Archdiocese of Berbérati
- Headquarters: Mbaïki, Lobaye, Central African Republic

Statistics
- Area: 26,225 km^{2} (10,126 sq mi)
- Population: Total; Catholics: (as of 2023); 310,365; 123,127 (39.7%)
- Parishes: 10

Information
- Denomination: Catholic Church
- Sui iuris church: Latin Church
- Rite: Roman Rite
- Established: 10 June 1995; 31 years ago
- Cathedral: Cathédrale Sainte-Jeanne-d'Arc in Mbaïki
- Secular priests: 17 (9 Diocesan, 8 Religious Orders)

Current leadership
- Pope: Leo XIV
- Bishop: Jesús Ruiz Molina, M.C.C.I.
- Metropolitan Archbishop: Dennis Kofi Agbenyadzi, S.M.A.
- Bishops emeritus: Guerrino Perin, M.C.C.I.

Map
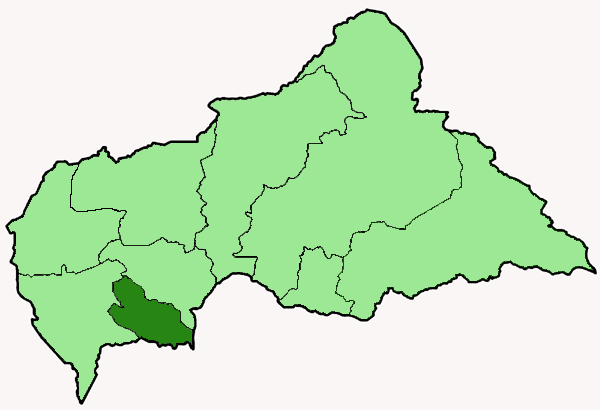

The Roman Catholic Diocese of Mbaïki (Latin: Mbaikien(sis)) is a diocese in Mbaïki in the ecclesiastical province of Berbérati in the Central African Republic.

== History ==
- 10 June 1995: Established as Diocese of Mbaïki from the Metropolitan Archdiocese of Bangui

== Leadership ==
Bishops of Mbaïki (Roman rite)

- Guerrino Perin, M.C.C.I. (10 June 1995 – 10 March 2021), retired
  - Apostolic Administrator Guerrino Perin, M.C.C.I. (10 March 2021 – 25 April 2021), Bishop Emeritus of Mbaïki
- Jesús Ruiz Molina, M.C.C.I. (10 March 2021 – present)

== See also ==
Roman Catholicism in the Central African Republic

== Sources ==
- Diocese of Mbaïki at CatholicHierarchy.org
- GCatholic.org
