= Agostino Giuseppe Delfino =

Italian bishop (1935–2020)

Agostino Giuseppe Delfino OFMCap (17 June 1935 – 18 October 2020) was an Italian-born Capuchin and bishop of the Roman Catholic Church.

== Life ==
Delfino was born in Italy. He joined the Capuchin order in 1952 and was ordained a priest on September 19, 1959.

Pope John Paul II appointed him Bishop of Berbérati on June 17, 1991. Delfino was ordained a bishop by the Archbishop of Bangui, Joachim N'Dayen, on October 27 of the same year in the Cathedral of St. Anne in Berbérati; Co-consecrators were Michel Marie Joseph Maître CSSp, Bishop of Bambari, and Armando Umberto Gianni OFMCap, Bishop of Bouar.

Delfino served as bishop of Berbérati from 1991 to 2010. On June 17, 2010, Pope Benedict XVI. his application for resignation for reasons of age. He died in the Capuchin convent in Savona.
