= Cathédrale Notre-Dame (Bangui) =

Roman Catholic cathedral in Bangui, Central African Republic

- Cathédrale Notre-Dame Bangui
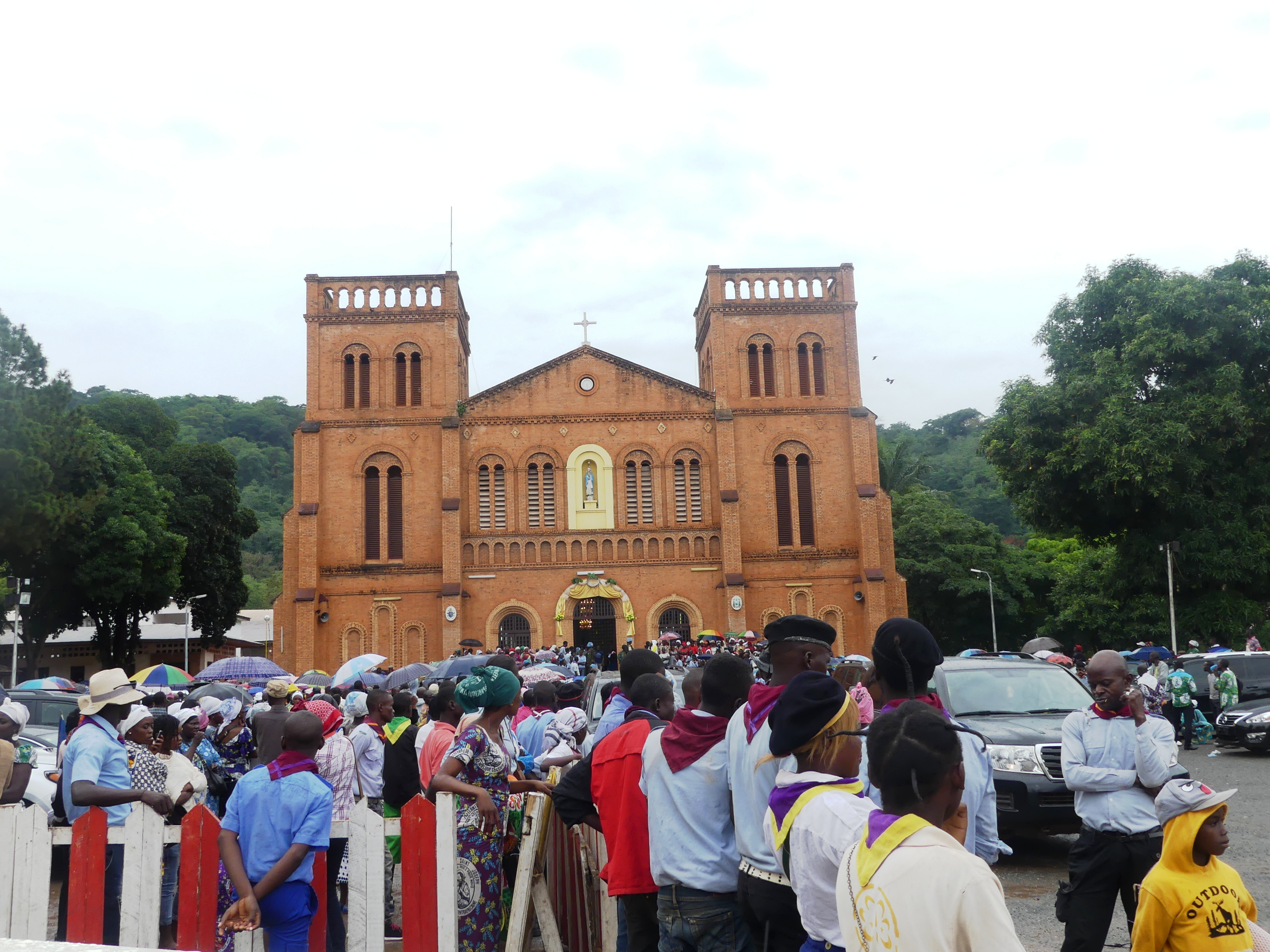
- Bangui Cathédrale Notre-Dame in 2018
- Cathédrale Notre-Dame
- 4°22′12″N 18°34′41″E
- Location: Bangui
- Country: Central African Republic
- Denomination: Roman Catholic Church

History
- Founded: 1937

Architecture
- Completed: 1937

The Cathédrale Notre-Dame-de-l’Immaculée-Conception (Cathedral of Our Lady of the Immaculate Conception) is a Roman Catholic Cathedral and the seat of the Metropolitan Archdiocese of Bangui in the Central African Republic (CAR), built in 1937. It is built with red brick, a common type in former French tropical colonies.

It is located in central Bangui, 2 km away from the Barthélemy Boganda Stadium and Bangui City Hall.

It was the location for the Coronation Mass of Jean-Bédel Bokassa (Bokassa I) in 1977 and the opening of the first holy door of the Catholic Church's Extraordinary Jubilee of Mercy on 29 November 2015.

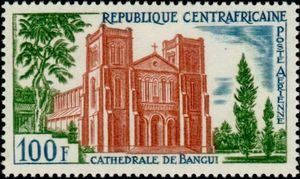
Postage stamp of the Central African Republic, depicting the Cathédrale Notre-Dame of Bangui
