= Diocese of Bouar =

Roman Catholic diocese in the Central African Republic

Coordinates: 5.9367°N 15.5935°E

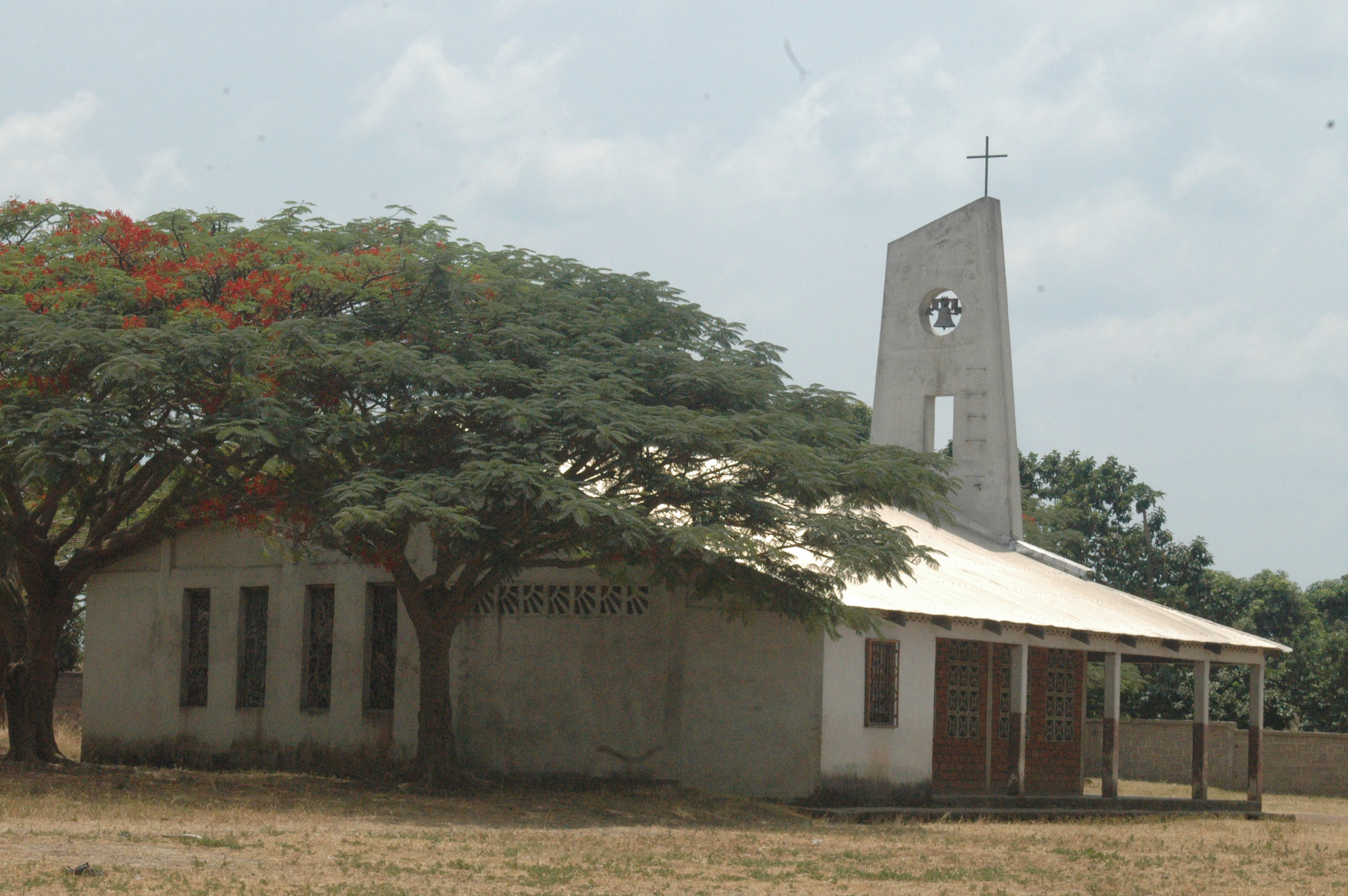
A church of the diocese in the village Niem.

The Roman Catholic Diocese of Bouar (Latin: Buaren(sis)) is a diocese in Bouar in the ecclesiastical province of Berbérati in the Central African Republic.

== History ==
- February 27, 1978: Established as Diocese of Bouar from the Diocese of Berbérati

== Leadership ==
- Bishops of Bouar (Roman rite)
  - Bishop Armando Umberto Gianni, O.F.M. Cap. (February 27, 1978 – December 2, 2017)
  - Bishop Mirosław Gucwa (February 11, 2018 – present)

== See also ==
Roman Catholicism in the Central African Republic

== Sources ==
- Diocese of Bouar at CatholicHierarchy.org
- GCatholic.org
