= Diocese of Alindao =

Roman Catholic diocese in the Central African Republic

Coordinates: 5.0389°N 21.2125°E

Diocese of Alindao Dioecesis Alindaöensis

Location
- Country: Central African Republic
- Metropolitan: Bangui

Statistics
- Area: 18,475 km^{2} (7,133 sq mi)
- Population: Total; Catholics: 162,000; 39,214 (24%)

Information
- Sui iuris church: Latin Church
- Rite: Roman Rite
- Cathedral: Cathédrale Sacré-Coeur, Alindao

Current leadership
- Pope: Leo XIV
- Bishop: Cyr-Nestor Yapaupa

Map
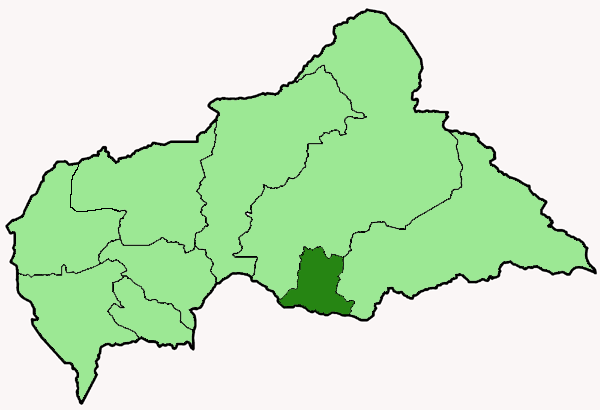

The Roman Catholic Diocese of Alindao (Latin: Alindaöen(sis)) is a diocese in Alindao in the ecclesiastical province of Bangui in the Central African Republic.

== History ==
- December 18, 2004: Established as Diocese of Alindao from the Diocese of Bangassou

== Special churches ==
The cathedral is the Cathédrale Sacré-Coeur in Alindao.

== Bishops ==
- Bishops of Alindao (Latin Church)
  - Peter Marzinkowski, C.S.Sp. (December 18, 2004 – March 19, 2014)
  - Cyr-Nestor Yapaupa (March 19, 2014–present)
- Coadjutor bishop
  - Cyr-Nestor Yapaupa (2012–2014)

== See also ==
- Roman Catholicism in the Central African Republic
