= Diocese of Bossangoa =

Roman Catholic diocese in the Central African Republic

Coordinates: 6.4868°N 17.4472°E

Diocese of Bossangoa Dioecesis Bossangoensis

Location
- Country: Central African Republic
- Metropolitan: Archdiocese of Berbérati
- Headquarters: Bangui, Central African Republic

Statistics
- Area: 62,680 km^{2} (24,200 sq mi)
- Population: Total; Catholics: (as of 2023); 751,000; 458,000 (61.0%)
- Parishes: 14

Information
- Denomination: Catholic Church
- Sui iuris church: Latin Church
- Rite: Roman Rite
- Established: 9 February 1959; 67 years ago
- Secular priests: 27

Current leadership
- Pope: Leo XIV
- Bishop: Nestor-Désiré Nongo-Aziagbia, S.M.A.
- Metropolitan Archbishop: Dennis Kofi Agbenyadzi
- Bishops emeritus: Xavier Yombandje

The Roman Catholic Archdiocese of Bossangoa (Latin: Bossangoën(sis)) is a diocese in Bossangoa in the ecclesiastical province of Berbérati in the Central African Republic.

== History ==
- 9 February 1959: Established as Apostolic Prefecture of Bossangoa from the Diocese of Berbérati
- 16 January 1964: Promoted as Diocese of Bossangoa

== Bishops ==
=== Ordinaries, in reverse chronological order ===
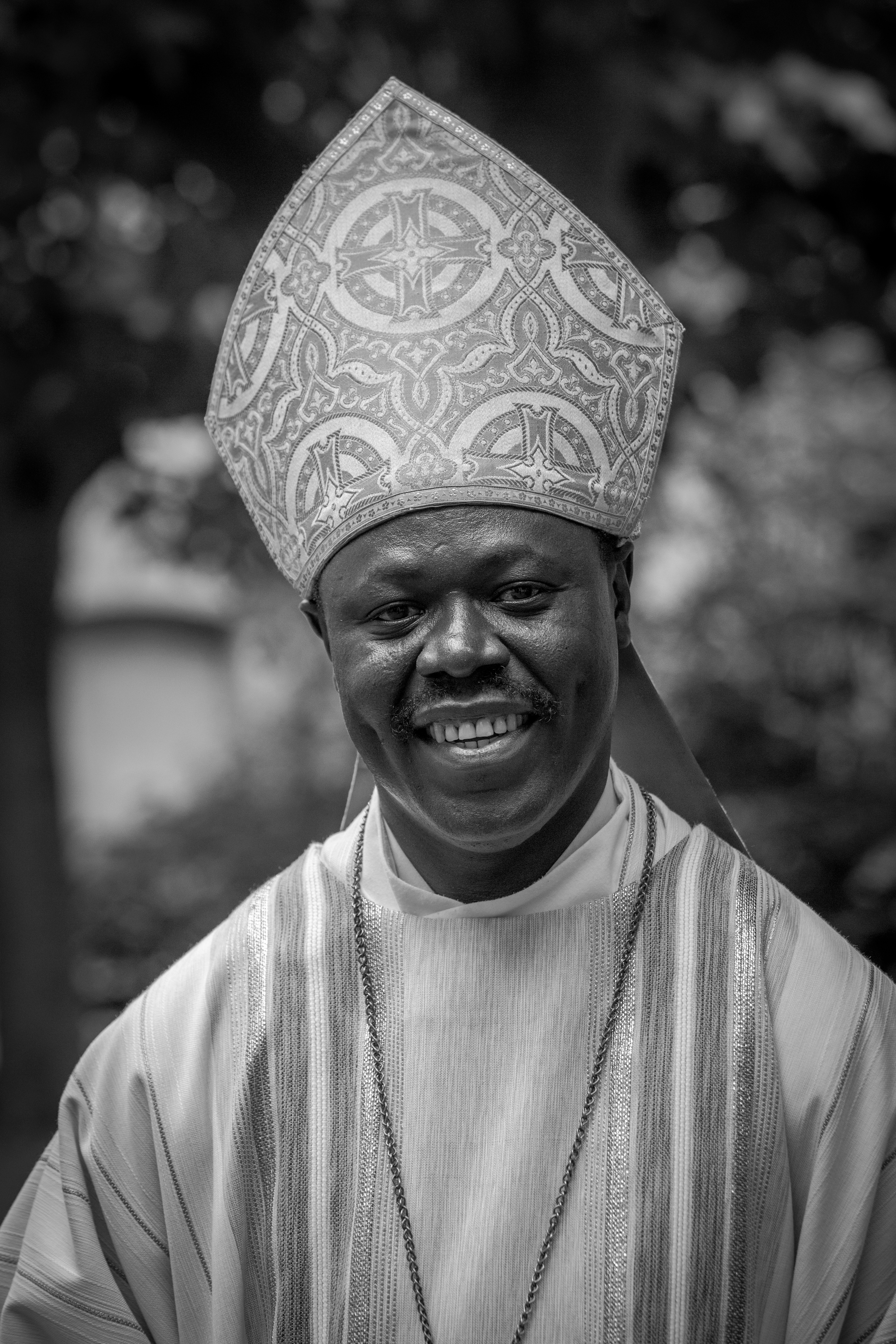
Bishop Nestor-Désiré Nongo-Aziagbia.

- Bishops of Bossangoa (Roman rite), below
  - Bishop Nestor-Désiré Nongo-Aziagbia, SMA (14 May 2012 – Present)
  - Bishop François-Xavier Yombandje (3 April 2004 – 16 May 2009), resigned
  - Bishop Paulin Pomodimo (10 June 1995 – 26 July 2003), appointed Archbishop of Bangui
  - Bishop Sergio Adolfo Govi, OFMCap (22 April 1978 – 10 June 1995), resigned
  - Bishop Léon-Toussaint-Jean-Clément Chambon, OFM Cap (16 January 1964 – 22 April 1978), resigned; see below
- Prefect Apostolic of Bossangoa (Roman rite), below
  - Father Léon-Toussaint-Jean-Clément Chambon, OFMCap (14 December 1959 – 16 January 1964); see above

=== Coadjutor bishop ===
- Sergio Adolfo Govi, OFMCap (1975-1978)

=== Auxiliary bishop ===
- Edouard Mathos (1987-1991), appointed Auxiliary bishop of Bangui

== See also ==
Roman Catholicism in the Central African Republic

== Sources ==
- Diocese of Bossangoa at CatholicHierarchy.org
- GCatholic.org
