= Archdiocese of Berbérati =

Roman Catholic diocese in the Central African Republic

Coordinates: 4.2550°N 15.7886°E

Archdiocese of Berbérati Archidioecesis Berberatensis Archidiocèse de Berbérati

Location
- Country: Central African Republic
- Headquarters: Bangui, Central African Republic

Statistics
- Area: 44,000 km^{2} (17,000 sq mi)
- Population: Total; Catholics: (as of 2023); 534,190; 257,800 (48.3%)
- Parishes: 20

Information
- Denomination: Catholic Church
- Sui iuris church: Latin Church
- Rite: Roman Rite
- Established: 28 May 1940; 86 years ago
- Secular priests: 37

Current leadership
- Pope: Leo XIV
- Metropolitan Archbishop: Dennis Kofi Agbenyadzi, S.M.A.

Map
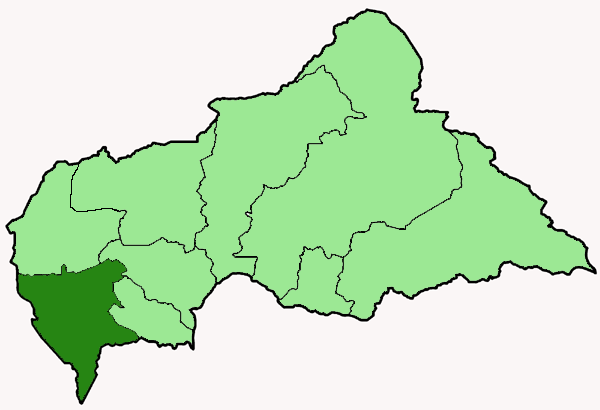

The Roman Catholic Archdiocese of Berbérati (Latin: Berberaten(sis)) is the Metropolitan See for the ecclesiastical province of Berbérati, located in the western region of the Central African Republic. However it remains under the authority of the missionary Roman Congregation for the Evangelization of Peoples.

Its episcopal see is the cathedral in Berbérati, in the Mambéré-Kadéï Prefecture (southwest, formerly Haute-Sangha). The city also has the former cathedral dedicated to Saint Anna.

== Statistics ==
As per 2014, it pastorally served 214,000 Catholics (48.3% of 443,000 total) on 44,000 km^{2} in 16 parishes and 7 missions, with 30 priests (24 diocesan, 6 religious), 34 lay religious (10 brothers, 24 sisters) and 33 seminarians .

== History ==
- Established on 28 May 1940 as Apostolic Prefecture of Berbérati, on territories split off from the Apostolic Vicariate of Foumban (in Cameroon) and the Apostolic Vicariate of Oubangui Chari (now the Central African Republic).
- Lost territory on 9 January 1947 to establish the then Apostolic Prefecture of Fort-Lamy (in Chad)
- Promoted on 13 March 1952 as Apostolic Vicariate of Berbérati, hence entitled to a (titular) bishop
- 14 September 1955: Promoted as Diocese of Berbérati
- Lost territories on:
  - 9 February 1959 to establish the Apostolic Prefecture of Bossangoa and
  - 27 February 1978 to establish the Diocese of Bouar.
- 25 April 2026: Promoted as Archdiocese of Berbérati

== Ordinaries ==
(all Roman rite; so far all members of missionary congregations)

Apostolic Prefect of Berbérati

- Father Pietro Alcantara da Habas, OFMCap (28 March 1941 – 1952), resigned

Apostolic Vicar of Berbérati

- Alphonse-Célestin-Basile Baud, OFMCap (10 April 1954 – 14 September 1955); see below

Suffragan Bishops of Berbérati

- Alphonse-Célestin-Basile Baud, OFMCap (14 September 1955 – 2 June 1979), resigned; see above
- Jérôme-Michel-Francis Martin, OFMCap (3 October 1987 – 17 June 1991), resigned
- Agostino Giuseppe Delfino, OFMCap (17 June 1991 – 17 June 2010), retired
- Dennis Kofi Agbenyadzi, SMA (14 May 2012 – 25 April 2026), first native ordinary; see below

Archbishops of Berbérati

- Dennis Kofi Agbenyadzi, SMA (25 April 2026 – Present); see above

== Ecclesiastical province ==
The Ecclesiastical province has the following suffragan sees:

- Diocese of Bossangoa
- Diocese of Bouar
- Diocese of Mbaïki

== See also ==
- Roman Catholicism in the Central African Republic

== External links and sources ==
- GCatholic.org
