= Mbaïki =

- Location in Central African Republic
- Coordinates: 3°52′15″N 17°59′06″E
- Country: Central African Republic
- Prefecture: Lobaye

Government
  - Sub-Prefect: Juvénal Silvère Ngodi
- Elevation: 514 m (1,686 ft)

Population (2012)
  - Total: 25,140

Mbaïki (also spelt Mbaki or M'Baiki) is the capital of Lobaye, one of the 14 prefectures of the Central African Republic. It is situated in the southwest of the country, 107 km from the capital Bangui. Lobaye people and Pygmy people live in the area. There is also a waterfall near the town.

== History ==
Mbaïki was ceded by France to Germany under the terms of the 1911 Morocco-Congo Treaty, becoming part of the German colony of Neukamerun until it was reconquered by the French during World War I. Mbaiki received electricity in 1969. In 1995, the Roman Catholic Diocese of Mbaïki was established in the city.

As a consequence of the Central African Republic conflict (2012–present), its previously large Muslim population has been emptied from the town.

== Economy ==
The economy is based on the coffee and timber industries.

== See also ==
- Prefectures of the Central African Republic
