= Dieudonné Nzapalainga =

Roman Catholic Cardinal

His Eminence Dieudonné Nzapalainga C.S.Sp.
- Cardinal, Archbishop of Bangui
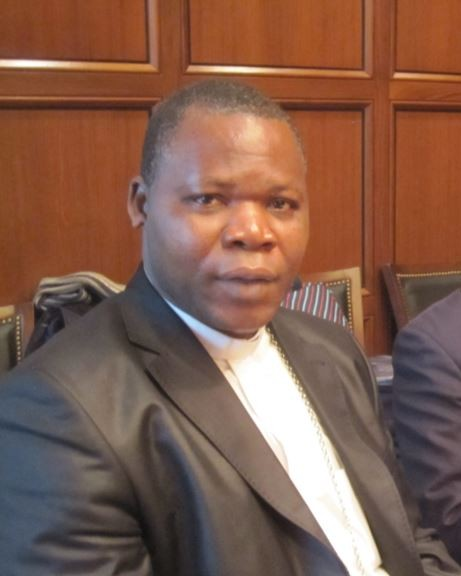
- Nzapalainga on 16 August 2014.
- Church: Catholic Church
- Appointed: 14 May 2012
- Other posts: President of the Central African Episcopal Conference (2013–); Cardinal-Priest of Sant'Andrea della Valle
- Previous post: Apostolic Administrator of Bangui (2009–2012)

Orders
- Ordination: 9 August 1998
- Consecration: 22 July 2012 by Fernando Filoni
- Created cardinal: 19 November 2016 by Pope Francis
- Rank: Cardinal-Priest

Personal details
- Born: Dieudonné Nzapalainga; 14 March 1967 (age 59) Bangassou, Central African Republic
- Motto: A l'image de Dieu Il les crea (Ad Imaginem Dei Creavit Illum) (In the Image of God He created them)
- Coat of arms

Ordination history of Dieudonné Nzapalainga
History
Priestly ordination
- Date: 9 August 1998
Episcopal consecration
- Principal consecrator: Fernando Filoni
- Co-consecrators: Jude Thaddeus Okolo; Edouard Mathos
- Date: 22 July 2012
Cardinalate
- Elevated by: Pope Francis
- Date: 19 November 2016
Episcopal succession
Bishops consecrated by Dieudonné Nzapalainga as principal consecrator
- Zbigniew Tadeusz Kusy: 15 August 2014

Styles of Dieudonné Nzapalainga
- Reference style: His Eminence
- Spoken style: Your Eminence
- Informal style: Cardinal

Dieudonné Nzapalainga, CSSp (born 14 March 1967) is a Central African prelate of the Catholic Church who has been the Archbishop of Bangui since 2012, where he served as apostolic administrator from 2009 to 2012. He has been president of the Central African Episcopal Conference since 2013. He is a member of the Spiritans.

When Pope Francis made him a cardinal in 2016, he became the first cardinal from the Central African Republic (CAR), the youngest member of the College of Cardinals and the first born after the Second Vatican Council.

== Biography ==
Dieudonné Nzapalainga was born in Mbomou in the Diocese of Bangassou on 14 March 1967, the fifth of ten children born to a poor farming family, his father a Catholic and his mother a Protestant. After completing his secondary schooling, he studied at the Saint Louis Minor Seminary in Bangassou. the Saints Apôtres Major Philosophy Seminary in was a postulant at Otélé in Cameroon, and Daniel Brottier Spiritan Major Seminary, in Libreville, Gabon. He was inspired from the age of ten to join the Spiritans by the model provided by a Dutch Spiritan missionary he knew as a boy, who mixed with the local people and taught him the priesthood was open even to boys like him from outside the urban centers. He professed his initial vows as a member of the Spiritans on 8 September 1993 and made his perpetual vows on 6 September 1997. He was ordained a priest on 9 August 1998.

He earned a licentiate in theology at the Jesuits' Centre Sèvres in Paris. From 1998 to 2005 he worked in Marseille as a chaplain at the Saint Francis de Sales house and at the parish of Saint Jerome. He later cited his years in France as providing him with firsthand experience of the lives of the poor and inspiring his commitment to the poor. From 2005 to 2009 he was regional superior for the Spiritans for its Central African region while working as a parish priest in Bangui. In 2008/2009 he was president of the Conference of Major Superiors of Central Africa.

Nzapalainga became the apostolic administrator of the Archdiocese of Bangui in 2009 following the resignation of Archbishop Paulin Pomodimo.

On 14 May 2012, Pope Benedict XVI appointed him Archbishop of Bangui. He received his episcopal consecration on 22 July 2012 from Cardinal Fernando Filoni and was installed on 29 July 2012.

He has been president of the Central African Episcopal Conference since 2013. In that role in participated in the October 2014 Synod of Bishops on the Family.

He has campaigned for international intervention in the warfare between Muslim and Christian factions in the CAR since it began in 2013, arguing that what appears as sectarian violence is rooted in political and economic time rivalries. Alongside other religious leaders (Note: His allies were Imam Omar Kabine Layama, president of the CAR Islamic Community, and Rev. Nicolas Guérékoyame Gbangou, president of the CAR's Evangelical Alliance.) he was named one of the 100 Most Influential People in the World in 2014 by Time magazine and awarded the 2015 Sergio Vieira de Mello Prize for Peace by the United Nations, among other awards for his peace advocacy. He met Pope Francis when he visited the CAR in 2015, where the pope opened the first Holy Door of the Year of Mercy,

Nzapalainga was elevated to the rank of Cardinal-Priest of Sant'Andrea della Valle. at a consistory held on 19 November 2016. He was the first cardinal from the CAR, the first born after the Second Vatican Council and the youngest member of the College of Cardinals until Giorgio Marengo became a cardinal in 2022. On 28 January 2017, he was named a member of the Congregation for the Evangelization of Peoples. He was elected moderator of one of the French-language discussion groups at the September 2018 Synod of Bishops on Youth and Vocation. On 8 July 2020, he was named a member of the Pontifical Council for Interreligious Dialogue.

Assessing the work of the October 2023 Synod of Bishops on Synodality, Nzapalainga praised its listening process and devoted to silence and discernment: "this climate of silence, listening and dialogue ... will allow us to move forward not under pressure but in a serene manner".

On 23 October 2024, the Synod of Bishops elected him a member of the Ordinary Council of the General Secretariat of the Synod.

He participated as a cardinal elector in the 2025 papal conclave that elected Pope Leo XIV.

== See also ==
- Cardinals created by Francis

== Notes ==
Catholic Church titles
Preceded by Paulin Pomodimo	Archbishop of Bangui; 14 May 2012 –	Incumbent
Preceded by Giovanni Canestri	Cardinal-Priest of Sant'Andrea della Valle; 19 November 2016 –	Incumbent
