= Paulin Pomodimo =

- Archbishop Emeritus of Bangui
- Church: Catholic Church
- Archdiocese: Archdiocese of Bangui
- In office: 26 July 2003 – 26 May 2009
- Predecessor: Joachim N'Dayen
- Successor: Dieudonné Nzapalainga
- Previous post: Bishop of Bossangoa (1995-2003)

Orders
- Ordination: 13 July 1980
- Consecration: 29 October 1995 by Joachim N'Dayen

Personal details
- Born: 30 June 1954 (age 71) Ziendi, Ubangi-Shari, French Equatorial Africa, French Empire

Archbishop Paulin Pomodimo (born 30 June 1954 in Ziendi) is a Roman Catholic archbishop in the Central African Republic. He was the archbishop of the Roman Catholic Archdiocese of Bangui, the capital city of the Central African Republic. He became archbishop in July 2003, when he replaced Joachim N'Dayen.

He resigned his post as Archbishop of Bangui on 26 May 2009 after a Vatican investigation found that many local priests had violated their vows of chastity, poverty and obedience.

He was later named ombudsman of the Central African Republic by President François Bozizé.
