= Joachim N'Dayen =

Roman Catholic archbishop (1934–2023)

His Excellency Joachim N'Dayen
- Archbishop Emeritus of Bangui
- Installed: 16 September 1970
- Term ended: 26 July 2003
- Predecessor: Joseph Cucherousset
- Successor: Paulin Pomodimo
- Previous post: Titular Archbishop of Culusi (1968–1970)

Orders
- Ordination: 22 July 1961
- Consecration: 5 January 1969 by Luigi Poggi

Personal details
- Born: 22 December 1934 Loko, French Equatorial Africa
- Died: 13 June 2023 (aged 88) Paris, France

Joachim N'Dayen (22 December 1934 – 13 June 2023) was a Roman Catholic archbishop in the Central African Republic. He was the archbishop of the Roman Catholic Archdiocese of Bangui, the capital city of the Central African Republic. He became archbishop on appointment by Pope Paul VI in September 1970, when he became the first Roman Catholic archbishop in the country. He resigned in 2003 and was replaced by Paulin Pomodimo. He presided over the Coronation Mass for Emperor Bokassa I in 1977.

N'Dayen died in Paris on 13 June 2023, at the age of 88.

Catholic Church titles
Preceded by Joseph Cucherousset	Archbishop of Bangui; 1970–2003	Succeeded by Paulin Pomodimo
Preceded by Position created	Titular Archbishop of Culusi; 1968–1970	Succeeded by Louis Vangeke
