= Archdiocese of Bangui =

Roman Catholic archdiocese in the Central African Republic

Archdiocese of Bangui Archidioecesis Banguensis Archidiocèse de Bangui
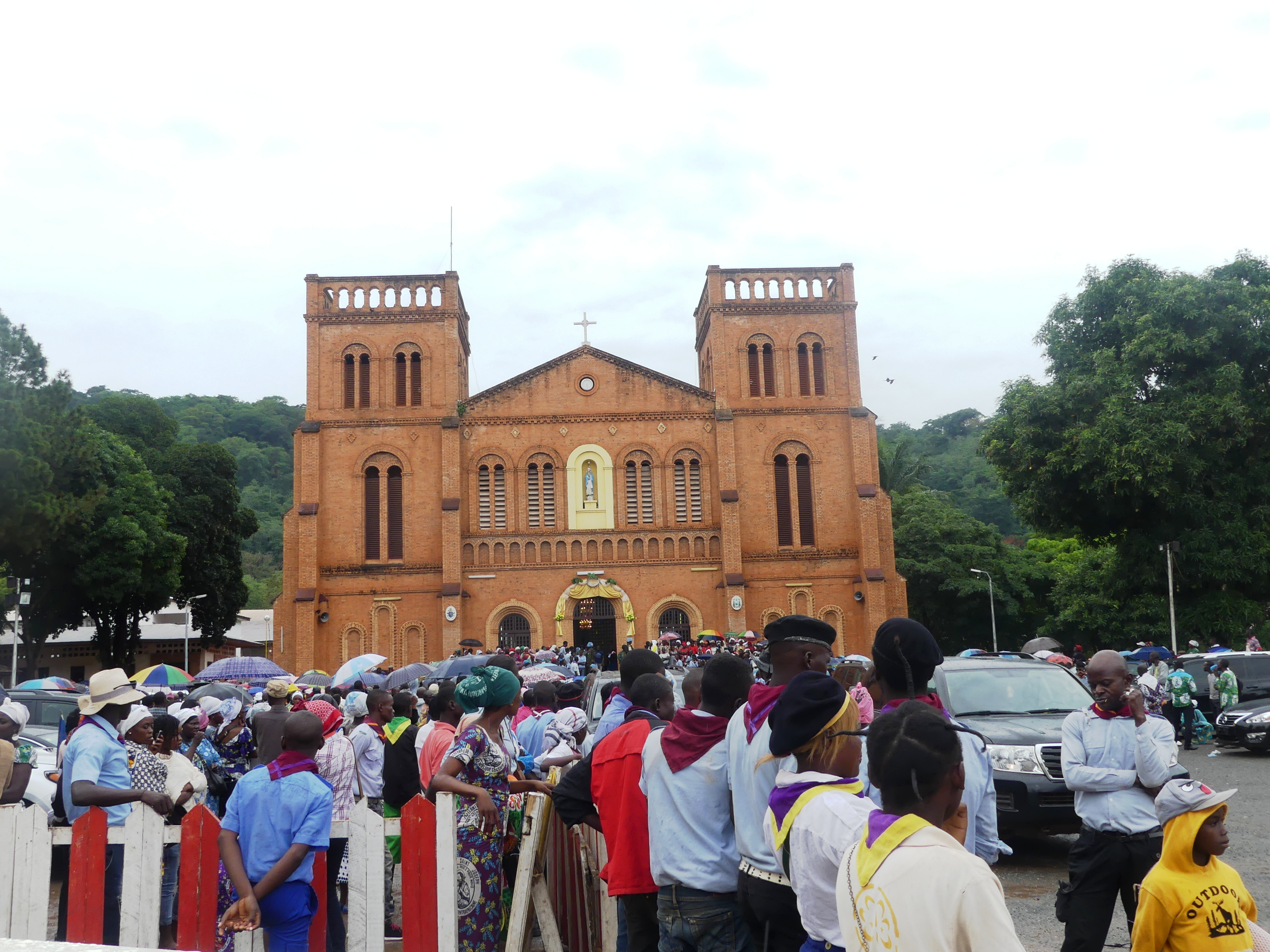
- Cathédrale Notre-Dame

Location
- Country: Central African Republic
- Coordinates: 4.3706°N 18.5797°E

Information
- Denomination: Catholic
- Cathedral: Cathédrale Notre-Dame

Current leadership
- Pope: Leo XIV
- Metropolitan Archbishop: Dieudonné Nzapalainga
- Bishops emeritus: Paulin Pomodimo

Map
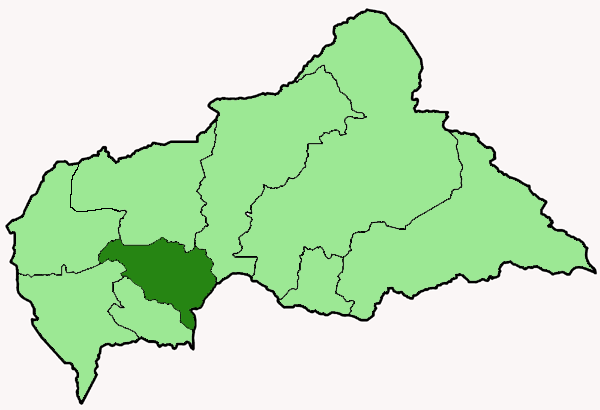

Website
- pastoralebangui.wordpress.com

The Roman Catholic Archdiocese of Bangui (Latin: Archidioecesis Banguensis) is the Metropolitan See for the ecclesiastical province of Bangui in the Central African Republic.

== History ==
- 8 May 1909: Established as Apostolic Prefecture of Oubangui-Chari from the Apostolic Vicariate of Upper French Congo
- 2 December 1937: Promoted as Apostolic Vicariate of Oubangui Chari
- 28 May 1940: Renamed as Apostolic Vicariate of Bangui
- 14 September 1955: Promoted as Metropolitan Archdiocese of Bangui

== Special churches ==
The seat of the archbishop is the Cathédrale Notre-Dame in Bangui.

== Bishops ==
=== Ordinaries ===
- Prefects Apostolic of Oubangui Chari (Roman rite)
  - Fr. Pietro Cotel, C.S.Sp. 1909–1915
  - Fr. Giovanni Calloch, C.S.Sp. 1915–1927
  - Fr. Marcel-Auguste-Marie Grandin, C.S.Sp. 2 May 1928 – 2 December 1937; see below
- Vicars Apostolic of Bangui (Roman rite)
  - Bishop Marcel-Auguste-Marie Grandin, C.S.Sp. 2 December 1937 – 4 August 1947; see above
  - Bishop Joseph Cucherousset, C.S.Sp. 9 April 1948 – 14 September 1955; see below
- Metropolitan Archbishops of Bangui (Roman rite)
  - Archbishop Joseph Cucherousset, C.S.Sp. 14 September 1955 – 16 September 1970; see above
  - Archbishop Joachim N’Dayen 16 September 1970 – 26 July 2003
  - Archbishop Paulin Pomodimo 26 July 2003 – 26 May 2009 (resigned)
  - Archbishop Dieudonné Nzapalainga, C.S.Sp. 14 May 2012–present; elevated to Cardinal in 2016

=== Coadjutor archbishop ===
- Joachim N’Dayen (1968–1970)

=== Auxiliary bishop ===
- Edouard Mathos (1991–2004), appointed Bishop of Bambari

=== Other priest of this diocese who became bishop ===
- François-Xavier Yombandje, appointed Bishop of Kaga-Bandoro in 1997

== Suffragan dioceses ==
- Alindao
- Bambari
- Bangassou
- Kaga–Bandoro

== See also ==
- Roman Catholicism in the Central African Republic
- List of Roman Catholic dioceses in the Central African Republic

== Sources ==
- GCatholic.org
