= Edouard Mathos =

Roman Catholic bishop

- Bishop of Bambari
- Church: Catholic Church
- Diocese: Diocese of Bambari
- In office: 6 November 2004 – 28 April 2017
- Predecessor: Jean-Claude Rembanga
- Successor: Bertrand Guy Richard Appora-Ngalanibé
- Previous posts: Auxiliary Bishop of Bangui (1991-2004); Titular Bishop of Giufi (1987-2004); Auxiliary Bishop of Bossangoa (1987-1991)

Orders
- Ordination: 19 June 1977
- Consecration: 10 January 1988 by Jozef Tomko

Personal details
- Born: 28 June 1948 Bossangoa, Ubangi-Shari, French Equatorial Africa, French Empire
- Died: 28 April 2017 (aged 68)

Edouard Mathos (28 June 1948 – 28 April 2017) was a Roman Catholic bishop.

Ordained to the priesthood in 1977, Mathos served as auxiliary of the Roman Catholic Diocese of Bossangoa, Central African Republic from 1987 to 1991. He then served as auxiliary bishop of Bangui from 1991 to 2004. Mathos then served as bishop of the Diocese of Bambari from 2004 until his death in 2017.
