= Catholic Church in the Central African Republic =

The Catholic Church in the Central African Republic is part of the worldwide Catholic Church, under the spiritual leadership of the Pope in Rome.

Catholics make up 38.29% of the total population in 2023. There are nine dioceses including two archdioceses.

- Bangui
  - Alindao
  - Bambari
  - Bangassou
  - Kaga-Bandoro
- Berbérati
  - Bossangoa
  - Bouar
  - Mbaïki

In 2015, Pope Francis made a visit to Bangui.

== See also ==
- Religion in the Central African Republic
- Freedom of religion in the Central African Republic
