= Pizza (disambiguation) =

Pizza is a popular Italian dish.

Pizza or PIZZA may also refer to:

== Films and fictional characters ==
- Jenny Pizza, a character in the animated series Steven Universe
- Pizza (2005 film), a film starring Kylie Sparks and Ethan Embry
- Pizza the Hutt, a character from the film Spaceballs
- Pizza Pasta, a character in the video game Punch-Out!! series

=== "Pizza" South Asian horror film franchise ===
- Pizza (film series), an Indian Tamil-language horror thriller film series by C. V. Kumar
  - Pizza (2012 film), first part of the series, starring Vijay Sethupathi and Remya Nambesan
  - Pizza II: Villa, 2013 sequel to the 2012 film
  - Pizza 3: The Mummy, 2023 sequel to the 2013 film, third part of the series
- Pizza (2014 film), an Indian Hindi-language film, remake of the 2012 film starring Akshay Oberoi, Parvathy Omanakuttan and Dipannita Sharma

== Music ==
- Pizza (album), a 1981 album by Alain Bashung
- Pizza (EP), a 2006 EP by Horse the Band
- "Pizza" (song), a 2017 song by Martin Garrix
- "Pizza", a song by Ruth Wallis
- The Pizzas, a musical side project of Australian band Ball Park Music

== Television ==
- Pizza (TV series), an Australian TV series
- The Pizza Show, an American TV series
- "The Pizza", an episode from the third season of The Amazing World of Gumball
- "Pizza", a Season 2 episode of Servant (TV Series)

== People ==
- Federico Pizza (1825–1909), Italian Roman Catholic prelate
- Mariagrazia Pizza, Italian vaccine researcher and professor
- Samuele Pizza (born 1988), Italian footballer

== Other uses ==
- Pizza (programming language)
- Pizza Connection Trial
- Pizzagate conspiracy theory
- Shakey's Pizza, traded as PIZZA on the Stock Exchange

== See also ==
- List of pizza chains
- List of pizza franchises
- List of pizza varieties
- &pizza (and pizza), U.S. fast casual restaurant chain
- Pizza Pizza, Canadian fast food pizzeria chain
- The Pizza Company, Thailand pizzeria chain
- Mr. Pizza, South Korean pizza chain
- Mister Pizza, Brazilian pizza chain
- The Pizza Show, a TV show on Viceland
- Pizza face (disambiguation)
- Pizza Guy (disambiguation)
- Pizzaboy (disambiguation)
- Pizzaman (disambiguation)
- Pissa (disambiguation)
- Pisa (disambiguation)
