= Pizza Guy =

Pizza Guy may refer to:

== People ==
- Informally, a male pizza delivery employee
- Salvatore D. Romano (born 1967) nicknamed "The Pizza Guy" in the press, Gambino Family mafioso

=== Fictional characters ===
- Pizza Guy, a character from the Korean-U.S. cartoon Higglytown Heroes
- Pizza Guy, a guest star character from season 3 of the cartoon Phineas and Ferb, voiced by Guy Fieri
- Pizza Guys, a superhero duo from the season 1 episode "Cowman and Ratboy" of the cartoon Back at the Barnyard

== Music ==
- "Pizza Guy (song)", a 2013 song by Touch Sensitive.
- "Pizza Guy" (1995 song), a song by You Am I from their album Hi Fi Way

== Other uses ==
- Pizza guy, a schtick from the live call-in show WindTunnel with Dave Despain

== See also ==
- Free Pizza Guy, a character from the cartoon Gravity Falls, see List of Gravity Falls characters
- Mister Pizza, Brazilian pizza chain
- Mr. Pizza, South Korean pizza chain
- Pizzaman (disambiguation)
- Pizzaboy (disambiguation) (disambiguation)
- Pizza (disambiguation)
- Guy (disambiguation)
