= Ngotto, Lobaye =

Ngotto
- Location in Central African Republic
- Coordinates: 4°1′13″N 17°20′9″E
- Country: Central African Republic
- Prefecture: Lobaye
- Sub-prefecture: Boda
- Commune: Lobaye

Government
  - Mayor: Jean Yaba

Ngotto, often written N'gotto, is a town situated in Lobaye Prefecture, Central African Republic. The town is known for its forest reserve.

== Geography ==
Ngotto is located 224 km from Bangui and 54 km from Boda. The town is bordered by Lobaye River (east), Ngotto Forest (west), Malanga River (north), and Mbaéré River (south). The town is divided into eight neighborhoods which are Ngotto, Bogbe, Moustapha, Mbai, Yaba, Damale, Ngodo, and Camp des Pygmées. Furthermore, Ngotto also serves as the capital of Lobaye Commune.

== History ==
Bofi people from Cameroon who fled from war founded Ngotto before the 19th century, and they named it Mboto. When Pierre Savorgnan de Brazza visited the locality, he misspelled the town's name to Ngotto. In 1889, Ngotto district was established. The French colonialist founded a post in Ngotto in 1903. Ngotto was affected by Kongo-Wara rebellion that led Bofi to lose its dominance in the town and accelerated the withdrawal of rubber companies.

In 1963, Ngotto was divided into seven neighborhoods. A fire incident caused by bushfires broke out in Ngotto from 27 January to 28 January 2011, razing 30 houses and granaries. Armed poachers killed four people, including two gendarmes, in the town on 14 July 2011, causing insecurity among the residents.

During the Seleka occupation in Ngotto, they looted the timber factory, causing the disruption of the town's ferry for 10 months. In April to May 2014, Ngotto suffered from severe food malnutrition due to the ongoing conflict. In 2018, Muslims reportedly faced difficulty visiting Ngotto as they were deemed foreigners and Seleka, and often got harassed both verbally and physically.

== Demography ==
In 2007, Ngotto had a population of 4255 people, and it consisted of Bofi, Ngbaka, Gbaya, Mbati, Chadians, and Aka. The Aka people lived in the town's outskirts.

== Economy ==
Agriculture, forestry, gathering, fishing, and mining are economic activities in the town. The residents harvested cassava, peanuts, maize, and coffee. Diamond is a product that has been mined in the town since 1958.

== Education ==
A catholic school was established in 1958. There is a primary school in the town. There will also be a nursery school in Ngotto, and classes are expected to start in October 2025.

== Healthcare ==
Ngotto has one health center.

== Bibliography ==
- Catholic Relief Services (19 May 2014). Rapid Food Security & Livelihoods Assessment - Lobaye Prefecture, CAR April/May 2014 (PDF) (Report).
- USAID (July 2007). PROJET DES DROITS DE PROPRIÉTÉ ET DU DÉVELOPPEMENT ARTISANAL DE DIAMANTS (PRADD): RAPPORT D'ETUDE MARP DANS LES ZONES (PDF) (Report). Archived from the original (PDF) on 3 March 2016.
