= Karawa, Central African Republic =

Karawa
- Location in Central African Republic
- Coordinates: 4°10′N 18°3′E
- Country: Central African Republic
- Prefecture: Lobaye
- Sub-prefecture: Mbaïki
- Commune: Léssé

Karawa is a village in the Lobaye region in the Central African Republic approximately 55 km southwest of the capital, Bangui.

Nearby towns and villages include Banza (6.0 nm), Kinga (2.2 nm), Zende (1.7 nm), Bobili (5.8 nm), Ndimbi (6.2 nm), Botoko (7.6 nm) and Bobangui (8.1 nm).
