= Mongounda =

- Location in Central African Republic
- Coordinates: 4°2′19″N 18°1′26″E
- Country: Central African Republic
- Prefecture: Lobaye
- District: Mbaki

Mongounda is a village in the Lobaye region in the Central African Republic southwest of the capital, Bangui.

Nearby towns and villages include Bamango (8.4 nm), Bobili(3.0 nm), Ndimbi (2.3 nm), Bonguele (2.1 nm) and Banguele (7.5 nm).
