= Ndimbi =

- Location in Central African Republic
- Coordinates: 4°3′47″N 18°3′9″E
- Country: Central African Republic
- Prefecture: Lobaye
- District: Mbaki
- Elevation: 1,358 ft (414 m)

Ndimbi is a village in the Lobaye region in the Central African Republic southwest of the capital, Bangui.

Nearby towns and villages include Bobili (3.4 nm), Mongounda (2.3 nm), Karawa (6.2 nm), Boubanzegue (2.0 nm), Botoko (2.9 nm), Bonguele (2.3 nm) and Mboma (2.0 nm)
