= Gazi-Béa =

- Location in Central African Republic
- Coordinates: 4°55′52″N 17°0′51″E
- Country: Central African Republic
- Prefecture: Lobaye
- Sub-prefecture: Boganangone
- Commune: Boutélossi

Gazi-Béa, also known as Gazibéa and Gazibeya, is a village situated in Lobaye Prefecture, Central African Republic.

== History ==
From 30 March to 1 April 2024, a conflict between herders and the locals occurred in Gazi-Béa over the theft of herders' cows by the villagers. Seven people were killed and others wounded. Due to the attack, the residents fled to Boguéré or bush. Responding to this tension, FACA and Wagner were deployed to the village to restore peace and order.

An alleged 3R rebels attacked Gazi-Béa on 6 May 2024, killing six villagers and burning houses. This attack prompted the locals to seek refuge in the nearby villages and bush. On the next day, FACA and Wagners went to the village.

== Healthcare ==
Gazi-Béa has one health post.
