= Pissed =

Pissed may refer to:

- Pissed (album), a 1994 album by Dangerous Toys, or the title track
- "Pissed", a 2018 song by Saweetie
- Pissed, past tense of piss or urinate

== See also ==
- Pissed off, slang for angry
- Pissed up, slang for intoxicated
- Piss (disambiguation)
- Pisser (disambiguation)
