= Boundara =

- Location in Central African Republic
- Coordinates: 3°56′0″N 18°11′0″E
- Country: Central African Republic
- Prefecture: Lobaye
- District: Mbaki
- Elevation: 1,453 ft (443 m)

Boundara is a village in the Lobaye region in the Central African Republic southwest of the capital, Bangui and near the border with the Democratic Republic of the Congo.

Nearby towns and villages include Bogboua (2.2 nm) Pissa (7.2 nm), Sinzongo (8.0 nm), Ancien Bakani (8.0 nm) and Bohomandji (1.4 nm).
