= Botoko =

- Location in Central African Republic
- Coordinates: 4°3′0″N 18°6′0″E
- Country: Central African Republic
- Prefecture: Lobaye
- District: Mbaki
- Elevation: 1,388 ft (423 m)

Botoko is a village in the Mbaki district of the Lobaye region in the Central African Republic.

Nearby towns and villages include Ndimbi (2.9 nm), Mboma (2.2 nm), Boubanzegue (1.0 nm), Karawa (7.6 nm), Bobangui (1.0 nm) and Mbi (2.8 nm).
