= Pizza face =

Pizza face may refer to:

- an insult for a person with much acne on their face

== Characters ==
- Pizzaface, a fictional character from the 2023 video game Pizza Tower
- Pizza Face, a fictional character from Teenage Mutant Ninja Turtles; see List of Teenage Mutant Ninja Turtles (2012 TV series) characters
  - A toy Teenage Mutant Ninja Turtles action figure
- Pizzaface, a fictional character from 1995 All That season 1
- Pizzaface, a fictional character from 1989 film Caged Fury; see Ron Jeremy filmography

== Other uses ==
- "Pizza Face", 1986 song by Barnes & Barnes off the album Sicks (album)
- "Pizza Face", 2014 episode of Teenage Mutant Ninja Turtles (2012 TV series) season 2
- Sasheer Zamata: Pizza Face, a 2017 TV comedy special on Seeso
- Pizza Face: A Graphic Novel, a 2024 comic by Rex Ogle
- Pizza Faces, the members of the band The Pizza Underground

== See also ==
- Pizza (disambiguation)
- Face (disambiguation)
