= Bonguele =

- Location in Central African Republic
- Coordinates: 4°1′27″N 18°3′24″E
- Country: Central African Republic
- Prefecture: Lobaye
- District: Mbaki
- Elevation: 1,407 ft (429 m)

Bonguele is a village in the Lobaye region in the Central African Republic southwest of the capital, Bangui.

Nearby towns and villages include Mongounda (2.1 nm), Ndimbi (2.3 nm), Mbi (0.7 nm), Mboma (0.8 nm) and Banguele (7.3 nm).
