= Bobangi =

Bobangi can refer to:

- Bobangi language, a precursor of the Lingala language
- Bobangui, a village in the Central African Republic
