= Mboma =

- Location in Central African Republic
- Coordinates: 4°2′0″N 18°4′0″E
- Country: Central African Republic
- Prefecture: Lobaye
- District: Mbaki
- Elevation: 1,401 ft (427 m)

Mboma is a village in the Lobaye region in the Central African Republic southwest of the capital, Bangui.

Nearby towns and villages include Bonguele (0.8 nm), Ndimbi (2.0 nm), Boubanzegue (1.4 nm), Botoko (2.2 nm) and Mbi (1.0 nm).

== See also ==
- Communes of Cameroon
