= Piss =

Piss is a profanity; along with pisses or pissing it may refer to:

- Urine, a liquid by-product of the body that is secreted by the kidneys and excreted through the urethra
  - Urination, the ejection of urine to the outside of the body
- Piss (Černý), a 2004 sculpture by David Černý
- Pin Index Safety System (PISS), a type of safety system
- Phoenix Islands Settlement Scheme (PISS)

== Music ==
- Piss (album), a 1993 album by Slank
- "Piss", a song by Doja Cat from the album Scarlet 2 Claude
- "Piss", a song by Pantera from the album Vulgar Display of Power
- "Piss", a song by Ministry from the album Animositisomina
- "Piss", a song by Neil Cicierega from the album Mouth Silence

== See also ==
- PIS (disambiguation)
- Pissed (disambiguation)
- Pisser (disambiguation)
- Pissing contest
- Pissy (disambiguation)
- Pissing
- Profanity
- Seven dirty words
- Taking the piss
