= Pizzaman =

Pizzaman or Pizza Man may refer to:

- Pizza delivery person
- Pizza Man (1991 film), an American comedy film by J.F. Lawton
- Pizza Man (2011 film), an American family action film by Joe Eckardt
- Pizza Man (2015 film), an Indonesian film starring Karina Nadila
- Pizzaman (band), a 1990s British electronic music duo featuring Norman Cook
- The Pizza Man (foaled 2009), an American Thoroughbred racehorse
- Ray Pizzi (1943–2021), nicknamed "Pizza Man", American jazz musician
- "Pizza Man", a song from the 1973 National Lampoon off-Broadway show Lemmings

== See also ==
- Pizzaboy (disambiguation)
- Pizza Guy (disambiguation)
- Mister Pizza, a Brazilian pizza chain
- Mr. Pizza, a South Korean pizza chain
