= Biami =

- Location in Central African Republic
- Coordinates: 3°58′N 18°10′E
- Country: Central African Republic
- Prefecture: Lobaye
- District: Mbaki

Biami is a village in the Lobaye region in the Central African Republic southwest of the capital Bangui and near the border with the Democratic Republic of the Congo.

Nearby towns and villages include Yakoussou (8.1 nm), Mbi (6.7 nm), Bogombe (5.4 nm), Pissa (5.4 nm), Babassoua (4.1 nm) and Bogboua (1.4 nm).
