= Bagandou =

- Location in Central African Republic
- Coordinates: 3°44′40″N 17°50′22″E
- Country: Central African Republic
- Prefecture: Lobaye
- Sub-prefecture: Moboma
- Commune: Moboma

Population (2013)
  - Total: 4,500

Bagandou is a village located in the Central African Republic prefecture of Lobaye. It has about 4,500 inhabitants.

Since 2000, Bagandou has been the seat of Polish missionaries. There is also a hospital in the village, built with money collected by missionary carollers from Tarnów diocese.

The Catholic Mission in Bagandou currently has 14 chapels along with the parish church. The parish priest in Bagandou is Fr. Mieczysław Pająk, who comes from the vicinity of Nowy Sącz.

== History ==
On 9 July 2020 demonstrators burned down police headquarters in Bangadou following a police killing.

In early January 2021 Bagandou was captured by Anti-balaka fighters, members of Coalition of Patriots for Change. It was recaptured by government forces on 6 January after killing 24 rebels.
