= Pissa, Central African Republic =

Pissa
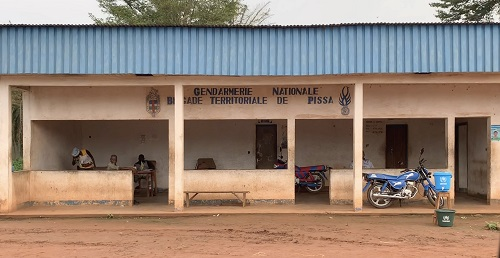
- Gendarmerie post in 2020

- Location in Central African Republic
- Coordinates: 4°3′7″N 18°11′52″E
- Country: Central African Republic
- Prefecture: Lobaye
- District: Mbaki
- Elevation: 408 m (1,339 ft)

Pissa is a village in the Lobaye region in the Central African Republic southwest of the capital Bangui and near the border with the Democratic Republic of the Congo.

Nearby towns and villages include Bogombe (3.9 nm), Boyama (3.6 nm), Sinzongo (1.4 nm), Biami (5.4 nm), Bogboua(6.2 nm) and Boundara (7.2 nm) .
