= Bobangui =

- Location in Central African Republic
- Coordinates: 4°3′0″N 18°7′0″E
- Country: Central African Republic
- Prefecture: Lobaye
- Sub-prefecture: Mbaïki
- Commune: Pissa
- Elevation: 422 m (1,385 ft)

Population
  - Total: 16 486

Bobangui (or Bougangui) is a large M'Baka village in Lobaye, Central African Republic, located at the edge of the equatorial forest some 80 kilometres (50 mi) southwest of the capital, Bangui. The first Prime Minister of the Central African Republic, Barthélemy Boganda, the first President of the Central African Republic, David Dacko, and the emperor of the Central African Empire, Jean-Bédel Bokassa, were from Bobangui.

Nearby towns and villages include Botoko (1.0 nm), Diligba, Bobanzengue, Bonguélé, Gbabili, M'Banza, Bossako, Yéma, Sabé. Karawa (8.1 nm), Zende (8.6 nm), Gbokopeteme (9.2 nm) and Bogombe (1.0 nm).
