= Pissa =

Pissa may refer to:

- Pissa River, Russia
- Pissa, Central African Republic, a village
- Pissa or Bisinus (fl. c. 500), king of Thuringia

== See also ==
- Pisa (disambiguation)
- Pizza (disambiguation)
