= Back at the Barnyard =

American animated television series

- Title card
- Genre: Surreal humor Slapstick
- Created by: Steve Oedekerk
- Based on: Barnyard by Steve Oedekerk
- Voices of: Chris Hardwick; Jeff Garcia; Leigh-Allyn Baker; Tino Insana; Cam Clarke; Rob Paulsen; Dom Irrera; Wanda Sykes; Fred Tatasciore; Maria Bamford; Steve Oedekerk
- Theme music composer: Michael Fitzpatrick; Mickey Petralia
- Opening theme: "Back at the Barnyard Theme Song" performed by Michael Fitzpatrick & Mickey Petralia
- Ending theme: "Back at the Barnyard Theme Song" (instrumental)
- Composer: Guy Moon
- Country of origin: United States
- Original language: English
- No. of seasons: 2
- No. of episodes: 52 (97 segments) (list of episodes)

Production
- Executive producer: Steve Oedekerk
- Producer: Paul Marshal
- Running time: 11 minutes; 22 minutes (specials); 46 minutes ("Cowman: The Uddered Avenger")
- Production company: Omation Animation Studio

Original release
- Network: Nickelodeon
- Release: September 29, 2007 – September 18, 2010
- Network: Nicktoons
- Release: September 12 – November 12, 2011

Back at the Barnyard (originally advertised as Barnyard: The Series) is an American animated comedy television series created and executive produced by filmmaker Steve Oedekerk. The series follows the film Barnyard (2006), which he wrote, co-produced, and directed. The series features the voice of Chris Hardwick as Otis, replacing Kevin James from the film, and introduces Leigh-Allyn Baker as Abby, while Jeff Garcia, Tino Insana, Cam Clarke, Rob Paulsen, Dom Irrera, Wanda Sykes, Maria Bamford, Fred Tatasciore and Oedekerk reprise their roles from the film.

Back at the Barnyard aired from September 29, 2007 to September 18, 2010 on Nickelodeon for two seasons. The show was a co-production between Oedekerk's Omation Animation Studio and Nickelodeon Animation Studio. The last five episodes aired from September 12, 2011 to November 12, 2011, on Nicktoons. It received mixed reviews from critics throughout its run, but garnered a cult following on online social media platforms after its cancellation.

== Plot ==
Following the film's events, Otis and his friends continue going on various misadventures and trying to keep their anthropomorphism a secret from humans.

== Episodes ==
| Season | Episodes | | Originally released | | |
| Season | Episodes | | First released | Last released | Network |
|---|---|---|---|---|---|
| Film | | | August 4, 2006 | | N/A |
| 1 | 26 | | September 29, 2007 | February 24, 2009 | Nickelodeon |
| 2 | 26 | 21 | February 25, 2009 | September 18, 2010 | Nickelodeon |
| 2 | 26 | 5 | September 12, 2011 | November 12, 2011 | Nicktoons |

== Characters ==
- Chris Hardwick as Otis
- Jeff Garcia as Pip
- Tino Insana as Pig
- Leigh-Allyn Baker as Abby
- Cam Clarke as Freddy
- Rob Paulsen as Peck
- Dom Irrera as Duke
- Wanda Sykes as Bessy
- Maria Bamford as Mrs. Beady
- Steve Oedekerk as Snotty Boy and Mr. Beady
- Fred Tatasciore as Farmer Buyer

== Video game ==
Back at the Barnyard: Slop Bucket Games
- Developer: Firemint
- Publisher: THQ
- Platform: Nintendo DS
- Release: NA: October 20, 2008; AU: October 23, 2008; EU: October 24, 2008
- Genre: Action game
- Mode: Single-player

Back at the Barnyard: Slop Bucket Games (released in European regions under the name Back at the Barnyard: Barnyard Games) is an action video game released by THQ in 2008 exclusively for the Nintendo DS, a system not among the platforms the Barnyard tie-in game was released on to promote the preceding film. It received generally negative reviews from critics, with a score of 49 from review aggregator Metacritic.
