= Benesa =

- Location in Central African Republic
- Coordinates: 6°38′N 16°51′E
- Country: Central African Republic
- Prefecture: Ouham
- District: Bossangoa

Benesa is a village in the Ouham region in the Central African Republic.

Nearby towns and villages include Banmba (9.8 nm), Vora (4.2 nm), Bankara (1.0 nm), Botokoni (1.4 nm) and Bouasi (1.4 nm).
