= Pisa (disambiguation) =

Pisa is a city in Tuscany, Italy.

Pisa or PISA may also refer to:

== Places ==
- Province of Pisa, a province in the Tuscany region of Italy
- Republic of Pisa, a de facto independent state centered on the Tuscan city of Pisa during the 10th and 11th centuries
- Pisa, Greece or Pisatis, an ancient Greek town in Elis
- Pisa (river), Poland

== Ships ==
- Pisa-class cruiser, a class of three armoured cruisers built in the early 20th century
  - Italian cruiser Pisa, the lead ship of the class
- SS Pisa (1896), a transatlantic passenger steamship

== People ==
- Alberto Pisa (1864–1936), Italian painter
- Aleš Píša (born 1977), Czech ice hockey player
- Apisaloma Pisa Tinoisamoa (born 1981), American former National Football League player

== PISA ==
- Pakistan International Screen Awards, an entertainment awards event
- Penang International Sports Arena, Malaysia
- Primary Industries South Australia, defunct South Australian government agency whose merges formed PIRSA
- Programme for International Student Assessment, an OECD survey
- Puntland Intelligence Security Agency, National intelligence agency of Puntland
- The Protein Interfaces, Surfaces and Assemblies server, a bioinformatics web application

== Other uses ==
- Pisa (crab), a genus of crabs
- University of Pisa, Pisa, Italy
- A.C. Pisa 1909, an Italian football club, formerly Pisa Calcio
- Pisa language, spoken in Papua, Indonesia

== See also ==
- Francisco de Pisa (1534–1616), Spanish historian and writer
- Calcedonio Di Pisa (1931–1962), member of the Sicilian Mafia
- Pissa (disambiguation)
- Pizza (disambiguation)
