= Pisser =

Pisser may refer to

- Toilet
- Urinal
- Urination
- "Pisser", a song by I Mother Earth from Scenery and Fish

See also:

- Pissoir, a type of public urinal
- Pissoir (film), a 1988 film by John Greyson
- Pissa (disambiguation)
- Piss (disambiguation)
