= Botokoni =

- Location in Central African Republic
- Coordinates: 6°37′N 16°52′E
- Country: Central African Republic
- Prefecture: Ouham
- District: Bossangoa

Botokoni is a village in the Ouham region in the Central African Republic.

Nearby towns and villages include Benesa (1.4 nm), Bankara (2.2 nm), Bouan (1.4 nm) and Galimel (1.4 nm).
