= PIS =

PIS, PiS or Pis may refer to:

- Pis, Gers, a village in southwestern France
- Pakistan International School
- Państwowa Inspekcja Sanitarna (State Sanitary Inspection)
- Passenger information system
- Phoenix Indian School, in Arizona, US
- Pijin language, in the Solomon Islands, ISO 639-3 language code pis
- Ping Shan stop in Hong Kong, station code PIS)
- Poitiers–Biard Airport in France, IATA code PIS
- Polled Intersex Syndrome, a disorder of sexual development found in polled livestock, specifically goats
- Prawo i Sprawiedliwość (Law and Justice), a Polish political party

== See also ==
- PI (disambiguation)
- Piss (disambiguation)
- Manneken Pis, a sculpture of a urinating boy, a Brussels landmark
