= Pizzaboy =

Pizzaboy or Pizza Boy or variation, may refer to:

== People ==
- pizza delivery boy
- Sal Rinauro (pro-wrestler), who wrestled under the ringname "Pizza Boy"

=== Fictional characters ===
- Pizzaboy, a character from the Portuguese comic book The Adventures of Dog Mendonça & Pizzaboy
- Pizza Boy, a character from the webseries Home at Last (web series)
- The Pizza Boy, a character form the British children's stop-motion show Roary the Racing Car
- Pizza Boy (a.k.a. Marky), a character from the British soap opera EastEnders, see List of EastEnders characters (2018)

== Film and television ==
- Pizza Boy (TV episode) 2017 season 1 episode 2 of Room 104
- The Pizza Boy (TV episode) 2002 number 26 season 2 episode 4 of According to Jim, see List of According to Jim episodes
- Pizza Boy (animated short) 1996 animated short film from the anthology series What a Cartoon!

== Music ==
- Pizza Boy (2012 song), hiphop song from the 2012 mixtape London Boy
- Pizza Boy (2008 song), comedic song with David Cross from the album Awesome Record, Great Songs! Volume One
- Pizza Boy (2007 song), a song by Jim Bob off the album A Humpty Dumpty Thing

== Other uses ==
- Pizza Boy, a fictional pizzeria from Grand Theft Auto: Vice City, see List of Grand Theft Auto: Vice City characters

== See also ==
- Pizzaman (disambiguation)
- Pizza Guy (disambiguation)
