= Pissy =

Pissy may refer to the following places:

- Pissy, Burkina Faso
- Pissy, Somme, France
- Pissy-Pôville, France
- "Pissy" (song), by Gucci Mane featuring Roddy Ricch and Nardo Wick
