= Ron Jeremy filmography =

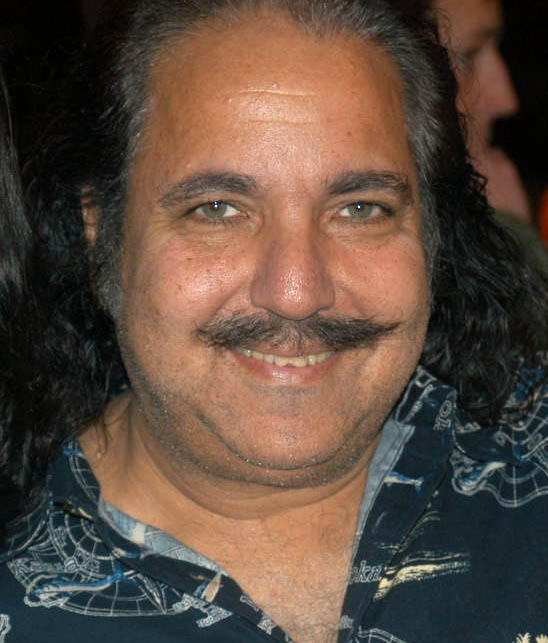
- Jeremy in 2005
- Film: 65
- Television series: 19
- Music videos: 1
- Others: 4

Ron Jeremy is an American former pornographic film actor, actor, filmmaker, businessman, television personality and stand-up comedian.

== Pornographic films (selection) ==
Year	Film	Role	Ref(s)
1980	Inside Seka	Bert Morris	
1980	The Good Girls of Godiva High	Bernie	
1980	Olympic Fever	Ivan	
1981	Debbie Does Dallas Part III	The Coach	
1982	Wanda Whips Wall Street	Mr. Drummond	
1985	Flesh and Fantasy		
1993	Super Hornio Brothers	Squeegie Hornio	
1994	John Wayne Bobbitt Uncut	1999 "Throbbin Hood & His Very Merry Men."	Friar Fu*k
2007	Not the Bradys XXX	Sam, The Butcher	

== Non-pornographic films ==
Year	Film	Role	Ref(s)
1977	Can I Do It... 'Til I Need Glasses?	Promoter	
1984	Ghostbusters	Man behind barricade (Note: Ron Jeremy was officially uncredited for this film.)	
1986	Cobra	Extra	
1986	52 Pick-Up (Note: Directed by John Frankenheimer)	Party goer (as Ron Jeremy Hyatt)	
1986	9½ Weeks	Special consultant	
1989	Caged Fury	Pizzaface (as Ron Hyatt)	
1989	Dead Bang	Biker Number Three (as Ron Jeremy Hyatt)	
1990	The Godfather Part III	Man chewing a toothpick in crowd – at 1:16:34	
1994	The Chase	Cameraman	
1994	Class of Nuke 'Em High 3: The Good, the Bad and the Subhumanoid	Professor	
1994	Killing Zoe	Bank concierge	
1995	South Beach Academy	Ron Hyatt	
1996	Tromeo and Juliet	Homeless man	
1996	They Bite	Darryl film-within-a-film Invasion of the Fishfuckers	
1997	George Wallace	Demonstrator	
1997	Orgazmo	Clark / Jizzmaster Zero	
1997	Boogie Nights	Consultant	
1998	Terror Firmer	Casey's Father	
1998	54	Ron - Customer who lost his ticket stub for his coat	
1998	Ronin	Fishmonger (scenes deleted, as Ron Hiatt) (Note: Jeremy's scene cut by the studio)	
1999	One Bad Day	Calvono	
1999	The Boondock Saints	Vincenzo Lapazzi	
1999	Detroit Rock City	Strip club MC	
2000	American Virgin	Cameo appearance	
2000	Nash Bridges	"El Diablo"	
2000	Reindeer Games	Prisoner	
2000	Citizen Toxie: The Toxic Avenger IV	Mayor Goldberg	
2002	Spun	The bartender	
2002	Back by Midnight	Cameo Appearance	
2002	The Rules of Attraction	Piano player	
2002	Hell's Highway	Jack	
2002	Death Factory	Glen/Glen the Hobo	
2002	Night at the Golden Eagle	Ray	
2003	Zombiegeddon	Todd (Voice actor)	
2003	Bruce Almighty	Man In Diner	
2003	America's Sexiest Girls		
2003	Paris	The Bartender	
2004	Tales from the Crapper	Jimmy	
2004	Creepies	Officer Spudic	
2005	Charlie's Death Wish	Captain Al Rosenberg	
2005	Frankenstein vs. the Creature from Blood Cove	Cameo appearance	
2006	Poultrygeist: Night of the Chicken Dead	Ron "Crazy Ron"	
2007	Finishing the Game	Peter Dowd	
2007	Succubus	Cameo appearance	
2008	Homo Erectus	Oog	
2008	One-Eyed Monster	Ron	
2009	Blood Moon Rising		
2009	Crank: High Voltage	Cameo appearance	
2009	Trade In	Richard Steadman	
2010	Big Money Rustlas	Grizzly Wolf	
2010	I Am Virgin		
2011	Killer School Girls from Outer Space		
2011	Chillerama	Captain Fatso / Playbear (segments "Wadzilla" and "I Was a Teenage Werebear")	
2012	Sorority Party Massacre	Detective Rico Depinto	
2012	Night of the Dead	Ivan	
2013	Skum Rocks!	Himself	
2013	Snitch	Cartel member	
2013	Shooting the Warwicks	Phatt Ed-E	
2014	Anselmi: The Young Werewolf	Roni	
2014	Jersey Shore Massacre	Ronny	
2016	Range 15	Himself	
2017	Return to Return to Nuke 'Em High AKA Volume 2	God	
2017	Scumbag	Himself	
2017	The Doll	Pimp Oliver	
2018	Beverly Hills Bandits	Boris	
2018	Sunset Society	Frankie	
2019	Japanese Borcht	Producer	
2019	Bad Ass Babes: The Movie	Himself	
2020	Bikini Valley Car Wash	Uncle Ron	
2020	Cut and Chop	Liquor store owner	
2020	Dale Archdale	Emmanuel	
2020	Killer Raccoons! 2: Dark Christmas in the Dark!	General Apathy	

== Television ==
Year	Program	Role	Ref(s)
1980	Wheel of Fortune	Ron Hyatt	
1995	Heidi Fleiss: Hollywood Madam		
1996	Bone Chillers	Blisterface	
2001	Family Guy	Himself	Episode: "Brian Does Hollywood"
2001	Just Shoot Me!: "The Proposal: Part 2"		2 Boys 1 fish (Ron Jeremy, Steve Theriault AMos)
2003	The Frank Skinner Show		
2003	The Surreal Life	Himself	
2003	Bullshit!		
2004	Chappelle's Show		
2005	The Farm		
2005	Kathy Griffin: My Life on the D-List		
2007	The Surreal Life: Fame Games	Himself	
2007	Red Eye w/ Greg Gutfeld	Guest commentator	
2008	Lewis Black's Root of All Evil	Brief cameo	
2010	Tosh.0		
2010	Newsradio		
2010	Anthony Bourdain: No Reservations	Himself	
2010	Silent Library		
2013	Hoarding: Buried Alive	Himself	Episode: "One is Good, Two is Better"
2020	S41NT	Actor	
2020	Studio City Kings	Diego	

== Video games ==
- 2003 Celebrity Deathmatch as himself (playable character)
- 2004 Leisure Suit Larry: Magna Cum Laude
- 2011 Postal III as himself, porn store owner
- 2019 Bad Ass Babes as himself

== Videos ==
- A series of viral video spoofs for video sharing website Heavy.com. The videos lampooned include Britney Spears, lonelygirl15, Little Superstar and others.
- He has appeared in the Kid Rock music videos for "Cowboy" and "American Bad Ass".
- "The Plot to Bomb the Panhandle" video, by the band A Day to Remember.
- An episode of Gorgeous Tiny Chicken Machine Show, in which was entitled "Pamous Movie Star".
- Music video "10 Miles Wide"
- Break.com video Tron Jeremy, a parody of the film Tron: Legacy. In October 2013, Jeremy appeared in Bart Baker's parody of Miley Cyrus's "Wrecking Ball".
- 3 cameo appearances in LMFAO's "Sexy and I Know It" video as himself in a black shirt with leopard print writing with "Sexy and I know it" on it.
- "Casual Sex" music video by My Darkest Days.
- Music video "Christina Linhardt's Habanera with Ron Jeremy and Friends"
- Short film "Bad Ass Babes"
- 2 cameo appearances in Sublime's "Date Rape" as a judge and inmate

== Web series ==
- 2009 Star-ving as himself

== Documentary films ==
- 2001 Porn Star: The Legend of Ron Jeremy as himself
- 2005 Fuck: A Fuckumentary as himself
- 2019 The Rainbow as himself
- 2022 Porn King: The Rise & Fall of Ron Jeremy as himself
