= List of Back at the Barnyard episodes =

This is a list of episodes for Back at the Barnyard. Each season has 26 episodes, and a total of 52 episodes were produced, spanning 2 seasons.

== Series overview ==
Season	Episodes		Originally released		
Season	Episodes		First released	Last released	Network
Film			August 4, 2006		N/A
1	26		September 29, 2007	February 24, 2009	Nickelodeon
2	26	21	February 25, 2009	September 18, 2010	Nickelodeon
2	26	5	September 12, 2011	November 12, 2011	Nicktoons

== Episodes ==
=== Film (2006) ===
Title	Written and directed by	Original release date
Barnyard	Steve Oedekerk	August 4, 2006 (Theatrical); January 19, 2009 (Nickelodeon)

=== Season 1 (2007–09) ===
No. overall	No. in season	Title	Directed by	Written by	Original release date
1a	1a	"The Good, the Bad and the Snotty"	T.J. Sullivan and Mike Gasaway	Jed Spingarn	September 29, 2007
On the day of Otis' birthday, he makes a prank call for the farmer to leave the barnyard for a day so they can have a party. His plan backfires, though, when the farmer hires Snotty Boy to babysit the farm animals. So the animals attack Snotty Boy with many booby traps to keep him from babysitting again.
1b	1b	"Escape from the Barnyard"	Mike Gasaway	Gene Grillo	September 29, 2007
When the farmer is seen with what appears to be a barbecue grill, they become afraid that the farmer plans to eat the animals, so they escape the farm on a hot air balloon. They end up landing in a golf course and mistake it for their new paradise.
2a	2a	"Cowman and Ratboy"	Mike Gasaway	Gene Grillo	October 6, 2007
Otis and Pip pretend to be superheroes Cowman and Ratboy, but the other animals are not fond of their antics. Fortunately, when Otis and Pip rescue the Pizza Twins from falling off a cliff, the animals decide to join them as superheroes.
2b	2b	"Cow's Best Friend"	T.J. Sullivan	Aaron Hilliard and Luke Del Tredici	October 6, 2007
After Otis saves Duke's life by pushing him away from a falling amplifier, Duke begins getting loyal to Otis and becomes devoted to helping Otis doing everything, but Otis soon becomes annoyed when Duke goes overboard.
3a	3a	"Chez Pig"	Mike Gasaway	Chris Painter	October 13, 2007
When Pig's truffle pies become a huge hit in the barnyard, the animals decide to use Pig's pies to sell them to the humans to make money, but Pig quits when the animals begin to get greedy with trying to make money, especially when a celebrity comes to buy the pie recipe from them.
3b	3b	"The Right Cow"	Todd Grimes	Gene Grillo	October 13, 2007
A space test monkey named Bingo crash-lands in the barnyard. The animals decide to let him stay in the barnyard, but Bingo is unsatisfied with the fact that Otis is the leader, so he tries to get rid of Otis so he can become leader. Meanwhile, Freddy and Peck believe that Bingo is a space alien and try to destroy him in ridiculous ways.
4a	4a	"Saving Mrs. Beady"	Mike Gasaway	Jed Spingarn	October 20, 2007
Otis' pranks and Abby's driving lesson have Mrs. Beady sent to a mental institution. Feeling guilty, the animals try to rescue her, much to their dismay: Mrs. Beady's doctor wants to put her on a brain transplant when he thinks Mrs. Beady has "crazy brain" because she sees the animals out the window.
4b	4b	"The Farmer Takes a Woman"	T.J. Sullivan	Brandon Sawyer	October 20, 2007
The animals are unable to have Saturday night parties because of the farmer constantly crying over his late wife. Otis finds him the perfect girlfriend to make him feel better, but they then realize that she is trying to get rid of the farm animals by kicking them out of the barn and take it over (forcing the animals to stay in the hen house which explodes because of the max capacity of the animals in there). Then the animals realize that the woman is after the Farmer's money and realize that she needs to be stopped. So they dress Pig as rich man to lure the woman away from the barnyard, but Pig wouldn't lie and he confessed to her, which makes the woman leave the farmer. In the end, the animals get to have their Saturday night parties, Pig is heartbroken (which he stops after a few minutes), and the farmer went on a cruise with some ladies.
5a	5a	"Hypno-A-Go-Go"	Todd Grimes	Andrew Nicholls and Darrell Vickers	November 24, 2007
When Otis gets a hypnosis kit, he accidentally hypnotizes himself so that he tries to destroy the farmer whenever he hears the sound of a bell. Now, the other animals must try to protect the farmer while trying to cure Otis at the same time. But every time Abby tries to stop Otis from hurting the farmer, he thinks she is hurting him.
5b	5b	"Fowl Play"	Mike Gasaway	Gene Grillo	November 24, 2007
With Peck nowhere to be seen and Freddy seen lying on Peck's feathers, the animals conclude that Freddy ate Peck and plan to ban Freddy from the barnyard (Duke locks Freddy in a 'scented' pet carrier to attract the pet store truck driver so Freddy would be adopted). Otis is determined to prove that Freddy is innocent, however. In the end, it is revealed that Freddy was only after the cinnamon buns Peck was going to give to the gophers in exchange for an anti-itch cream to cure an itch that was making him molt and Peck was hiding in an aloe patch after witnessing Mrs. Beady knocking Freddy out with a frying pan, leading to Freddy's name being cleared.
6a	6a	"Barnyard Games"	Todd Grimes	Chris Painter	January 19, 2008
Otis is embarrassed when Abby repeatedly beats him in the Barnyard Olympics, so he tries to find Abby's weaknesses and use them to his advantage. When Abby finds out, she tries to use the same tactics on Otis and both end up dangling from a cliff after believing a danger sign was another distraction.
6b	6b	"War of the Pranks"	T.J. Sullivan	Jessica Gao	January 19, 2008
To get revenge for Bessy's insults, Otis tries to humiliate and embarrass Bessy, but at every attempt, his pranks backfire. Bessy subsequently gives Otis a real (and humiliating) prank that ends up with him and Pip covered in honey and seeds.
7a	7a	"Lights! Camera! Moo!"	Mike Gasaway	Sam O'Neal and Neal Boushell	February 2, 2008
After Otis accidentally destroys the barn's safety film, he must make a new one, which he puts a lot of action and suspense in. When the other actors quit because of the dangerous stunts, Otis must make it on his own, and accidentally rises the barn into a tornado. In the end, Bessy makes the safety film all about Otis' unsafe antics.
7b	7b	"Animal Farmers"	Todd Grimes	Adam Cohen	February 2, 2008
Otis is excited because favorite country music star – Stumpity Joe – is coming to town. However, when trying to speed up crop collecting for the farmer to leave, he accidentally injures the farmer. Now, the animals must do all of the farming, or else the farm can go bankrupt. But several things have gone wrong because the animals aren't accurate farmers themselves. Otis milks himself wrinkly with the milk machine, Bessy and Abby refuse to use the milk machine on themselves, Pig eats all of the corn they picked (making him very fat), and Freddy goofs with the energy drink for the hens by putting dynamite in it, which he claims it's pepper, making the eggs the hens lay explode on contact. They manage to save the farm by being a part of Stumpity Joe's music video.
8a	8a	"Raging Cow"	Mike Gasaway	Gene Grillo	February 16, 2008
A hedgehog named Don Bling convinces Otis to fight in a wrestling match but it turns out that all of the matches are fixed so then Otis' opponents all lose intentionally. Now, Abby, Pig and Pip must try to stop Don Bling before Otis fights someone who is really trying.
8b	8b	"The Great Sheep Escape"	Todd Grimes	Joel Bergen and Alex Muniz	February 16, 2008
When Duke tries crazy methods for the sheep to be safe during bear season, they escape and now Otis and Duke must go on a cross country trip to get them before they escape to New Zealand. Meanwhile, Abby and Bessy dress Pig, Freddy, and Peck as sheep. But it backfired when the farmer thought Pig had the "nervous woolies" when Pig accidentally said "Beeeee" and "Boooo" instead of "Baaaa".
9a	9a	"The Big Barnyard Broadcast"	Mike Gasaway	Gene Grillo	March 15, 2008
After Mrs. Beady videotapes Otis and the gang walking and talking, she calls a news station to prove she isn't crazy with proof from the tape. The animals don't like it at all, though. Now, they try to interrupt the broadcast to not let any person see their everyday anthropomorphic behavior (and fulfill their dreams of becoming famous television stars). But it backfired, when the cameraman got a call from the network saying they're not on the air, leading the news station to change the animals' tv show back to the broadcast. So now the animals must now steal the tape to keep anyone from seeing their antics.
9b	9b	"Dead Cow Walking"	Mike Gasaway and Todd Grimes	Jed Spingarn	March 15, 2008
When the veterinarian stops by, she mentions that her van, the "Big Steer", won't last a week. However, Otis mistakenly thinks the veterinarian was referring to him and begins to think that he only has a week to live. To relieve himself, Otis tries to do everything he has ever dreamed of. When he returns, he is dismay to see the animals are seeming happy that he was gone (actually they were just acting so Otis could keep fulfilling his dreams). To make sure he isn’t forgotten Otis tries a canyons jumping stunt, only to crash just the misunderstanding about him having only a week left is cleared. Everyone is happy Otis isn’t dying, but he’s stuck in a body cast from the crash.
10a	10a	"Otis Season"	T.J. Sullivan	Jed Spingarn	March 29, 2008
This week's Moose Appreciation Week, so Otis disguises himself as a moose so he can get positive attention from humans, but his plan goes awry because the week is over and now the Moose HUNTING SEASON starts today and now Snotty Boy and his friends are trying to hunt him down, and his antlers are stuck to his head. So the animals rigged a robotic moose to scare Snotty Boy away from Otis. But Snotty Boy accidentally goes out on a busy road. So Otis has to save him from being hit by a car. Because of his heroism, the county now bans Moose Hunting Season and makes it Moose Appreciation Week all year long.
10b	10b	"Cows' Night Out"	T.J. Sullivan	Joel Bergen and Alex Muniz	March 29, 2008
Upon realizing how lame his friends are: Freddy and Peck dressing him up as a bunny instead of a monster to scare away crows, Abby inviting him to bingo, and his friends habits at bingo (Pip's loud keyboard typing, Duke's squeaking his toy, Abby's slurping on a drink, and Pig digging in his ear), Otis ditches them and goes out for a night on the town, pulling pranks with the Jersey Cows. Otis, unfortunately, ends up getting arrested. So now his friends have to come get him out and stop the police officer from taking him away again.
11a	11a	"Big Top Barnyard"	Todd Grimes	Jed Spingarn	April 12, 2008
Otis' favorite circus is coming to town, but the gang accidentally injures the main lead. Feeling guilty, Otis offers to take over and along with his friends, but Abby is too afraid to do her part because of an incident that happened long ago: She had dropped her partner when trying to catch him. Abby refuses to do the part because of being afraid to drop Otis. But without Abby, the show ends up being a disaster. This is the episode where Freddy the ferret is wearing nothing but purple swim trunks with yellow polka dots and no drawstrings.
11b	11b	"Pigmalion"	T.J. Sullivan	Lazar Saric	April 12, 2008
After the gang notices a distinctive birthmark on Pig's backside, Pig starts to believe that he is related to the royal Pampered Pigs. After training Pig, he becomes snobbish to his fellow companions.
12a	12a	"A Barn Day's Night"	T.J. Sullivan	Tom Sheppard	April 26, 2008
The animals become pop stars when Pip broadcasts one of their sessions, but soon their egos begin getting out of control and begins to put a damper on their friendship, which eventually causes a heartbroken Peck to quit. Little do the animals know that Peck's triangle playing is what keeps the rhythm.
12b	12b	"Meet the Ferrets"	T.J. Sullivan	Jed Spingarn	April 26, 2008
Freddy tries to hide his non-carnivore ways from his parents, who are invited to a birthday party at the farm, and Freddy tries to make sure they don't eat anybody, including Peck, while keeping it a secret to his friends.
13a	13a	"A Tale of Two Snottys"	T.J. Sullivan	Dan Serafin	May 10, 2008
After Snotty Boy returns to torment the animals, Otis accidentally falls on him and becomes unconscious. Luckily, he's got a pulse and they decide to take him back to the Beady's, but Abby says that Mrs. Beady will blame them. Otis sends a disguised Pig over to the Beadys' as Snotty Boy so they don't get suspicious. But Pig enjoys being Snotty Boy so much that he decides to stay as him forever. Meanwhile, Snotty Boy gets amnesia and the animals realize that the only way to get Pig back is to turn Snotty Boy back to his old mean, obnoxious jerky self so Mrs. Beady will recognize him and because Snotty Boy is annoying them with his newly found kindness and sweetness.
13b	13b	"Snotty's New Pet"	Todd Grimes	Gene Grillo	May 10, 2008
Otis' negligence has Pip captured by Snotty Boy, who plans on feeding him to his new pet snake (who talks exactly like him). Pip now needs to convince the snake to help him escape and Otis now needs to make things right with Pip.
14a	14a	"Home Sweet Hole"	Todd Grimes	Jed Spingarn	May 24, 2008
Pip's mousehole is destroyed by Otis accidentally. He moves in with the others, but they're all unused to each other's habits. After hearing a misunderstanding that is impossible to share a home with Pip, he runs away and finds a bee hive. Otis and his friends must search for him and return him to the barnyard.
14b	14b	"Otis' Mom"	T.J. Sullivan	Dan Serafin	May 24, 2008
Otis discovers that he has the same bell as Bessy's long lost child, so Bessy believes that Otis is her child, so she starts treating him like a child and humiliates him and refuses to let him goof around and do pranks on Mrs. Beady. To make matters worse, Pip manages to convince Bessy to marry him under the idea that Otis needs a stern father figure. Otis ends up discovsering the truth thanks to the newspaper the bell was wrapped in and must stop the wedding and explain the misunderstanding to Bessy.: Note: This episode was dedicated in loving memory to Lee Paulsen, Rob Paulsen's mother.
15a	15a	"Club Otis"	Mike Gasaway	Gene Grillo	June 7, 2008
Abby discovers Otis' secret club, but the animals don't want a female member there so they pretend the club is very boring so Abby would leave. Soon, though, Abby discovers that Otis is faking, so she creates a club herself. Now everybody wants to join her club and Otis is left alone. Otis, jealous of Abby's club, ends up creating a giant model volcano with real lava in order to lure his friends back. This leads to the barnyard under the threat of being incinerated and Abby and Otis must work together to stop the volcano.
15b	15b	"The Chronicles of Barnia"	Todd Grimes	Jed Spingarn	June 7, 2008
When the gang is caught by Snotty Boy in a game of "Dungeons and Barn Animals", they make Snotty Boy believe he is in the mythical land of Barnia, and now the animals must force him out before he takes over the barn.
16a	16a	"Barnyard Idol"	Todd Grimes	Tom Sheppard	July 21, 2008
When it's discovered that Pig has a beautiful singing voice, Otis and the gang enter Pig in a singing competition to win the farmer a golden tractor. When Mrs. Beady loses, she is out to prove that Pig is a talking barnyard animal. Meanwhile, Pig's over-practicing causes him to lose his voice. So Otis tries to use lip synching but he doesn't know the lyrics in the song, so Pig is booed for singing terrible lyrics. Likewise, Mrs. Beady exposes Pig's lip-synching when trying to reveal that he is a talking barnyard animal. In the end, Pig did win a prize (a tiny tote bag), but they couldn't keep the tractor they stole because it was illegal to steal a grand prize without approval of winning.
16b	16b	"The Haunting"	Mike Gasaway	Sam O'Neal and Neal Boushell	July 22, 2008
The ghostly spirit of a bunny named Winky possesses Pig after Otis builds a fun shack over a pet burial ground. Now the rest of the gang must stop Winky and his army of deceased pet spirits from taking over the barnyard and reclaiming the world.
17a	17a	"Brave Udders"	Todd Grimes	Dan Serafin	July 23, 2008
Otis becomes afraid when he receives a letter from his childhood bully, Krauser Krebs (voiced by Thomas F. Wilson), saying that he's coming to visit the barnyard, so his friends try to help him defend his fear of the bully.
17b	17b	"Otis' 11"	T.J. Sullivan	Gene Grillo	July 24, 2008
Otis loses the saloon to Chubs Malone, head of the gopher underground, in a game of Fizzbin. Now, the gophers dominate the barn at night. When Otis learns that Chubs cheated, he and the others must reclaim the barn.
18a	18a	"Pecky Suave"	Todd Grimes	Tom Sheppard	July 25, 2008
Peck takes a fake potion to get enough courage to speak to his crush, Hannah, but he ends up being so confident that he challenges Root, a rooster much bigger than him, to a duel.
18b	18b	"Otis vs. Bigfoot"	T.J. Sullivan	Gene Grillo	September 22, 2008
Bigfoot is sighted in the woods, and Otis decides to go hunting for him, but Abby finds him and brings him to the barnyard for his protection upon realizing that he isn't dangerous. however, Mrs. Beady is out to capture Bigfoot and prove she is not crazy.
19a	19a	"Top Cow"	Mike Gasaway	Gene Grillo	September 23, 2008
Otis becomes the county's new crop dusting ace. An accident causes him to quit, however, and at the wrong moment: a large swarm of locusts is about to destroy the crops.
19b	19b	"School of Otis"	Mike Gasaway	Tom Sheppard	September 24, 2008
Otis must take over teaching (in the stern of Bessy) after accidentally injuring Peck, the children's teacher. When he realizes that the kids learn boring things, he teaches the kids how to pull pranks. However, the kids develop an ultimate prank, which sends the barnyard silo to mid air, just when all of the animals are in there to hide from Duke, who appointed himself as new leader.
20a	20a	"Otis for Mayor"	Spike Brandt and Tony Cervone	Jed Spingarn	September 25, 2008
When Mrs. Beady tries to run for mayor, Otis decides to run for mayor against her to avoid Mrs. Beady from exposing them as talking animals. Their competition goes horribly out of control, however. In the end, nobody wins the election and the old mayor is placed back in office.
20b	20b	"Dummy and Dummier"	Todd Grimes	Dan Serafin	September 26, 2008
When Freddy gets depressed over his lack of talent, Otis and the gang decide to make him take up ventriloquism. The dummy that they make, Mr. Jinx, comes alive, however, and tries to kill them. The animals end up believing that Freddy is the one attacking them, leading to Freddy to clear his name and stop Mr. Jinx from killing his friends. It turns out that a colony of termites has possessed Mr. Jinx to get revenge on them for using their tree to create Mr. Jinx, leading to Freddy's name being cleared.
21	21	"Some Like It Snotty"	T.J. Sullivan	Steve Oedekerk and Tom Sheppard	October 24, 2008
Otis and his friends dress up as girls because the bowling alley is open, but only girls get to go free. Their plan backfires when Snotty Boy and his friends try to take them out on a date. They are forced to agree when they realize that Abby and Bessy have put glue on their women's clothes so that they can't take them off and they can't throw them off because Pip removed the stink bomb from the purse to make room for himself. After one night, the other animals couldn't take it anymore, but Otis still continues to go out as a girl so he can get free things from Snotty Boy. Everything goes well until Otis realizes that Snotty Boy has engaged to him.
22–23	22–23	"Cowman: The Uddered Avenger"	Mike Gasaway	Gene Grillo and Jed Spingarn	November 29, 2008
When Otis as Cowman is assigned the task of guarding the Jurassic Corn Kernel at the county fair, Mertin Fargleman (voiced by Tom Kenny) wants to steal it to win the Gardening Award posing as Professor Twineyvines. When the town is impressed with Twineyvines and unimpressed with Cowman trying to save the Kernel from him, Twineyvines becomes the new protector. Immediately, Otis takes the kernel to protect it and is branded a thief and then chased by a angry mob. He then decides to stop Twineyvines when Abby finds Otis and Pip headed for Peru and says that Peck, Pig and Freddy have been kidnapped by Mrs. Beady, who they do not know is in line with Twineyvines. Now, Otis, Pip, Abby, Pig, Freddy and Peck must unite to defeat Fargleman, clear Cowman's name, and save the Jurassic Corn Kernel (mutated into a giant monster) from destroying the fair (even though the fair was already destroyed).
24a	24a	"Pig Amok"	T.J. Sullivan	Gene Grillo	January 20, 2009
Pig returns to his birthplace to be married. But after Otis realizes that Pig's bride, Brunhilda, is cruel and bratty, he tries to stop the wedding by beating Pig in a contest because Pig ends up in a love trance and does not realize Brunhilda's true nature.
24b	24b	"The Sun Cow"	Todd Grimes	Jessica Gao	January 21, 2009
Otis' new Kobe cow neighbors begin to think that he's the reincarnation of the legendary Sun Cow when they discover Otis has a fifth udder (which was actually a bee sting). Otis is glad he has that status until he realizes that the cow neighbours actually serve "Sun Cows" at a steak restaurant and they're planning to do the same to Otis after his "sacred bath".
25a	25a	"Doggelganger"	Todd Grimes	Dan Serafin	January 22, 2009
While Duke is at the vet after being sprayed by Pig's skunk, a mischievous mutt named Baxter sneaks out and goes to the barnyard while disguised to look like Duke for what his life is. Duke now needs to escape and reclaim his life back from Baxter.
25b	25b	"Save the Clams"	Spike Brandt and Tony Cervone	Ned Goldreyer	January 23, 2009
Under Abby's request, Otis takes in a clam that she rescued from a nearby café. However, the clam is a rude and demanding house guest. It hogs the shower, has pig stop Otis from winning a radio contest by hanging up the phone to keep the temperatures in the barn right, takes over the barn at bedtime and, to make matters worse, it reproduces many party-going clams overnight. Otis believes that Abby will get in trouble with the farmer once he finds out she's the one who brought all the clams into the farm and decides to relax while the other animals are stuck with the millions of clams. Soon they don't want to leave and instead bile Otis when he tells them to get out. Now, the animals (or rather Abby) must figure out how to calm them down and claim back the barn.
26a	26a	"Cowdyshack"	Todd Grimes	Tom Sheppard	February 23, 2009
Otis uses Crazy Louie, a loopy groundskeeper at a high-end golf course and apparently his friend – to let him and the animals through the back gate and play a round. When Pig throws a club and accidentally hits Louie in the appendix, though, a guilt-ridden Otis decides to win the big golf tournament to get a new appendix.
26b	26b	"Adventures in Snotty Sitting"	Spike Brandt and Tony Cervone	Gene Grillo	February 24, 2009
After the animals break the farmer's classic video game system, they need to make some quick cash to replace it. Seeing an ad to babysit, they dress up as British nannies and show up at the address on the ad. Only when Mrs. Beady answers the door do they realize they're babysitting Snotty Boy, and Snotty Boy wreaks havoc for them. The animals have to have the little terror fed, bathed and into bed before the Beadys get home and earn the money for babysitting.

=== Season 2 (2009–11) ===
No. overall	No. in season	Title	Directed by	Written by	Original release date
27a	1a	"Wild Mike's Dance Party"	T.J. Sullivan	Jed Spingarn	February 25, 2009
Otis is bored of Abby's book club, so he releases Wild Mike from a cage so they can have a dance party, but things get out of control when Wild Mike accidentally escapes the barn and is captured by humans to use on a dancing TV show.
27b	1b	"Buyers Beware"	Mike Gasaway & Tom Grevera	Dan Serafin	February 26, 2009
When the farmer puts a sign that says "Welcome Buyers", the animals fear that he is selling the barn to other people, so whenever someone comes to the barn, they use tactics to scare them away. Then, though, they realize the Farmer's surname is Buyer and he is only having a family reunion. So they returned the Farmer's family to the barnyard just in time for the reunion.
28a	2a	"Abby and Veronica"	Todd Grimes	Gene Grillo	May 18, 2009
Abby is excited that her cousin, Veronica, is coming to the barnyard for a visit, but it turns out Veronica, despite appearing to be nice on the outside, is actually using her beauty to manipulate the animals into doing things to please her.
28b	2b	"Anchor Cow"	Spike Brandt & Tony Cervone	Tom Sheppard	February 27, 2009
When news anchor Hilly Burford is crushed covering a giant cheese curd that Otis made, the animals fill in for him on the news. They turn out to be a huge hit and replace Hilly, but Otis doesn't want them to replace him so they try to convince Hilly to get back to his job.
29a	3a	"Bling My Barn"	T.J. Sullivan	Dan Serafin	May 19, 2009
When Otis accidentally blows up the barn with an atom smasher he accidentally received in the mail, they audition for "Bling My Barn," a home improvement show that fixes up barns for deserving families. But when they have Pig wear a diaper, and pretend to be a baby, he discovers the perfect family they're competing against, he tries to warn the gang but they ignore him thinking he's throwing a tantrum, so he runs away forcing them on a wild goose chase to catch him. When they finally caught Pig, he shows them the perfect family, so they drop out of the contest and use the material from the farmer's house to rebuild the barn. This is the episode where pig is wearing nothing but a blue bonnet and a white pin diaper. This episode also contains innuendo where Otis's udders pop out of his clothes and he refers to them as extra guts. Terrance amateur's reaction implies he just witnessed what seemed like indecent exposure.
29b	3b	"Udderado"	Tom Grevera	Jed Spingarn	May 20, 2009
The animals turn the barnyard into a Wild West theme park to raise the Farmer's bail money (who got arrested because of Otis wearing a viking helmet and mooning a cop) and decide to hire an actor to play the bandit. Instead of an actor, unfortunately, a real bandit shows up to pillage the town. So Pig comes to Otis' rescue with unicorns from the unicorn theme park to stop the bandit from attacking the barnyard.
30a	4a	"Cupig"	Todd Grimes	Dan Serafin	May 21, 2009
Pig writes a love letter to his favorite pastry treat, but Otis finds it and thinks Abby wrote it to him.
30b	4b	"Happy Animal Fun Time"	T.J. Sullivan	Gene Grillo	May 22, 2009
In order to get out of going to a "Brianna Texicanna" concert with Abby so he and his friends can go bowling to beat a rival farm, Otis lies and says he needs to celebrate "Happy Animal Fun Time Day" in which everybody must stay home to celebrate. But Abby believes him and decides to cancel going to the concert and stay home to celebrate too. So Otis distracts her with the holiday's activities so that he can join with his friends at bowling and Abby doesn't see that he lied to her.
31a	5a	"Dream Birthday"	Tom Grevera	Tom Sheppard	June 29, 2009
The animals feel bad for the Farmer after seeing that everyone forgot his birthday, so they decide to throw him a party and tell him it's a dream, but the Farmer gets carried away. He does this by stealing a motorcycle from a gang of bikers and then believes that the motorcycle can fly so he takes the veterinarian with him. But he forgot that it doesn't and he and the veterinarian ends up falling to the ground below. So Otis hurries to save them before they fall to their death.
31b	5b	"Lord of the Beavers"	T.J. Sullivan	Tom Sheppard	June 30, 2009
When Otis injures himself, Pip temporarily takes over as the barn leader, and when he recovers, realizes that the others think Pip is a much better leader than Otis was. Insulted, Otis decides to leave the barnyard and be a leader where he's needed – with a den of beavers.
32a	6a	"Little Otis"	T.J. Sullivan	Story by : Teresa Trendler; Written by : Chris Hardwick	July 1, 2009
Otis is too lazy to do chores around the barnyard so he creates a clone of himself to do the work for him. It turns out the clone is a much smaller version of him, and when Mrs. Beady ends up capturing the clone, she is set to take him to a TV show so she can prove that animals can talk.
32b	6b	"Kids in the City"	Todd Grimes	Gene Grillo	July 2, 2009
When responsibility is thrust upon Otis to watch the three kids of the barnyard, Joey the calf, Macy the lamb, and Boyle the chick, after Abby and Bessy read story time, Otis loses them upon taking them around the big city when Otis and the gang had to remove a chip from Freddy's skin to keep Abby and Bessy from finding out where they are. So Otis and the gang stage a fake robbery to reunite with the kids after a cop finds them and about to take them to the station. But soon the kids call Abby and Bessy to pick them up. On the way back to the barnyard in a helicopter, Bessy tells them about Otis being a liar and after each line, she punches Otis and with him asking for a parachute to bail the helicopter.
33a	7a	"Snotty and Snottier"	T.J. Sullivan	Jed Spingarn	July 3, 2009
When Snotty Boy's cousin Bernard stays at the Beady house and torments Snotty Boy, he escapes and tries to seek refuge in the barnyard, so the animals must help Snotty Boy to defeat Bernard so then he could leave.
33b	7b	"Paging Dr. Filly"	Todd Grimes	Tom Sheppard	November 5, 2011 (Nicktoons) (Note: This episode was first released on the Back at the Barnyard: Season 2 DVD on November 1, 2011)
The animals call Dr. Filly to settle a recent persistent argument between Freddy and Peck, but instead of making things better, Dr. Filly seems to make it worse when other animals begin disliking each other. They were almost going to leave (except Bessy) until Otis reveals that Dr. Filly is an imposter donkey named Chip who likes to impersonate Dr. Filly.
34a	8a	"Barnyards and Broomsticks"	T.J. Sullivan	Dan Serafin	October 5, 2009
When the animals go on a camping trip, Pip tells a scary campfire story about a witch. When they get lost and find an old woman's house with tons of sweets, Otis fears that this woman is indeed the witch from Pip's story.
34b	8b	"The Barn Buddy"	Todd Grimes	Gene Grillo	October 5, 2009
The animals buy a security system called The Barn Buddy (Gilbert Gottfried) for the barnyard, but it turns out that the system is doing more harm than good.
35a	9a	"Iron Otis"	Todd Grimes	Dan Serafin	October 6, 2009
After Freddy's recipe for a tofrooster that is going to be cooked on the show, things get worse when Chef Big Bones (Jim Cummings) insists on using a real rooster, and captures Peck, so Otis disguises himself as a chef to save Peck from being cooked.
35b	9b	"Too Good to be Glue"	T.J. Sullivan	Tom Sheppard	October 6, 2009
When Pig cooks up what appears to be permanent glue, the animals try to sell the glue to make money. They soon realize that the glue explodes two hours after it is applied and must find a way to get rid of it safely. When they found all the glue from all the buyers, they realized they sold 500 pounds of glue to city hall so that the town can use it to patch the town's cracked manure tank. So the animals race to dispose the manure tank before it floods the town with manure.
36a	10a	"Everett's Treasure"	Todd Grimes	Jed Spingarn	October 7, 2009
The animals find an old safe in the barn that belonged to Everett's former owner Nebraska Schwartz. Everett doesn't remember the lock combination to open the safe, so Otis helps Everett recreate past memories of Everett's adventures with Nebraska Schwartz to help Everett recall the number.
36b	10b	"King Cud"	T.J. Sullivan	Dan Serafin	October 7, 2009
Otis is knocked out and wakes believing that he is King Cudenhotep. The only way for him to get back to normal before the farmer comes back is if someone knocks him in the head again, but Otis has beaver guards that prevent others from getting too close to him. When they finally turn Otis back to normal, the farmer see them but get hit on the head believes he is Ben Franklin.
37a	11a	"Free Schmoozy"	Todd Grimes	Gene Grillo	October 8, 2009
The animals liberate a show whale from a water show at a fair, but Otis has a lot more to go when the animals are being constantly eaten by this whale.
37b	11b	"Man's Best Fiend"	T.J. Sullivan	Tom Sheppard	October 8, 2009
Duke wants a playmate, but no other animal wants to play with him, so the animals convince the farmer to get Duke a playmate. Unfortunately for Duke, the farmer brings Duke's arch-rival Baxter back to the farm, and Baxter causes trouble with the farmer while blaming everything on Duke, getting Duke in trouble and being put in the barn with the other animals. They try to stop Baxter but the farmer scolds them for hurting him. So they dress Otis as a bear so that Baxter pushes the farmer to it and get Baxter in trouble. The plan works but Duke accidentally attacks a real bear instead because Otis was late on cue.
38a	12a	"Fumblebums"	Todd Grimes	Dan Serafin	October 9, 2009
The animals must stand in for injured football players in a game and the coach's mother to like him after becoming the mascots for the team.
38b	12b	"Endangered Liaisons"	Bert Ring	Tom Sheppard	October 9, 2009
The animals claim the farm as a protected habitat to prevent a wreck crew from tearing it down and disguise Freddy as a spotted three-toed ferret. They then realize that this species is real, and a real female spotted ferret Sadly is shipped to the barnyard and Freddy falls in love with her. the animals realize that female spotted ferrets eat male spotted ferrets when they marry, so the gang must get rid of her. Freddy is then heartbroken after his friends stop the wedding because he lost his one true love.
39	13	"Back at the Booyard"	Todd Grimes	Jed Spingarn	October 25, 2009
A Halloween episode, In a bid to collect the most Halloween candy and win a prize, Otis tops off the animals' trick-or-treat candy with a handful of candy from a hollow tree that legend says belongs to Hockey Mask Bob, who always gets his candy stolen and vows to return for revenge and reclaim his candy.
40a	14a	"Mr. Wiggleplix"	T.J. Sullivan	Tom Sheppard	November 14, 2009
Pig has been hanging out with his imaginary friend, Mr. Wiggleplix, for weeks, and it drives the other animals crazy. Then one day, Pig claims that Otis killed Mr. Wiggleplix so Otis has to dress up as Mr. Wiggleplix for Pig to feel better. Things take a turn for the worse when Otis says he is leaving for a magical land but Pig believes it and wants to go with him. All of a sudden, the real Mr. Wiggleplix comes alive and stops Otis from impersonating him.
40b	14b	"Chain Gang"	Tom Grevera	Gene Grillo	November 14, 2009
The animals get arrested when they are mistaken by the police for bandits disguised in animal costumes. Chained together, they try to escape so that they can use a computer to find the real thieves. But when they do catch the real thieves, the police says due to budget cuts, there aren't any keys to free them from their chain, so now they're stuck chained together.
41	15	"It's an Udderful Life"	T.J. Sullivan	Gene Grillo	December 5, 2009
A Christmas episode, Otis convinces his college buddies Donner and Blitzen to stop by the barnyard on Christmas Eve. During the visit, Otis accidentally gives Santa a cup belonging to Freddy, who is sick. When Santa comes down with Ferret Fever and can't finish his rounds in the county, which turns out to be his last stop on his Christmas Eve rounds, then Otis and the animals vow to make toys and deliver them by midnight to save Christmas. Meanwhile, Snotty Boy not knowing he's on the naughty list, really wants a Red Rider BB Taser that Santa doesn't bring him every year. So he sets a trap for Santa to make sure he brought his present.
42a	16a	"Get Bessy"	Todd Grimes	Jed Spingarn	January 2, 2010
Bessy is constantly rude towards the animals, even though she is barely seen. The animals wonder what she does when they don't see her and try to spy on her.
42b	16b	"A Beautiful Freddy"	T.J. Sullivan	Gene Grillo	January 2, 2010
After Freddy gets struck by lightning, he becomes a genius and knows everything, so they get him to compete in a trivia show so they can win a million dollars. They realize that, unfortunately, Freddy's intelligence is only temporary and he becomes stupid again after a prolonged period of time. So the animals make an electrical system to make Freddy smart with each shock. But the problem is, every time a question is announced, he keeps getting dumb again and again. Frustrated that he keeps getting dumb, Freddy goes backstage and shocks himself at high velocity and dreams that he meets with Albert Einstein who gives him the answer to the final question which is actually incorrect so Freddy curses Albert Einstein for making him lose.
43a	17a	"RoboPeck"	Tom Grevera & Todd Grimes	Tom Sheppard	January 16, 2010
After Otis accidentally breaks up Peck's body with a peanut hammer, he rebuilds Peck by adding robot parts to him so he can be a big help around the barnyard, but things go awry when Peck's circuits get overloaded after Otis puts pizza inside him and he goes out of control and Otis must try to stop Peck destroy the town.
43b	17b	"Puppy Love"	T.J. Sullivan	Dan Serafin	February 6, 2010
Duke is excited when his sister Stamps comes to visit, but is shocked when he realizes that Stamps is engaged to his arch-enemy, Baxter. However, the animals learn that Baxter is after Duke and Stamps' uncle's priceless dog bone collection. When they try to frame Baxter for chewing up a couch at his bachelor party (so that Stamps will dump him because she hates couch-chewers), Duke beats him to it and now scolded in front of Freddy and Peck. So at the altar, Duke tells Stamps about Baxter going after the dog bone collection, she dumps Baxter and he is launched in the field.
44a	18a	"Arcade of Doom"	Tom Grevera	Dan Serafin	January 16, 2010
Otis and the gang go to an arcade so they can get tickets to buy a gaming console. Snotty Boy and his friends also want the console, however, so they have to compete to see who can get the most tickets first. When the animals get the game console, they end up giving it to a little boy who begs for the console and turns out to be a midget. The arcade is eventually destroyed when Pig accidentally shines his pocket mirror in an animatronic fox's eyes which had a 3rd setting called "Destroy Humans." Meanwhile, Freddy falls in love with the animatronic fox, oblivious to its robotic nature.
44b	18b	"Rodeotis"	T.J. Sullivan	Tom Sheppard	February 6, 2010
The farmer is in love with a woman named Branco Betsy who's a rodeo host and is interested in bull riders, so Otis pretends to be the farmer's bull so Branco Betsy would be impressed. At the rodeo, however, Otis meets Psycho, a much bigger bull, who injures him, so now the farmer has to ride Psycho, the big (and dangerous) bull.
45a	19a	"A Catfish Called Eddie"	Nick Simotas	Gene Grillo	June 19, 2010
Otis' old best friend, Eddie comes to visit. Otis is mad because Eddie stole his product idea for pizza flavored gum. Eddie claims to have seen the error of his ways and wants new product ideas. Eddie starts hanging out with the gang and wins them over, except for Pip, who is suspicious. Pip then finds out that Eddie is just a sleazy, backstabbing jerk and reveals this to the gang. The gang decides to get rid of him by having the crows send Eddie flying off in a car made from cobs of corn from the field. Unfortunately, Eddie manages to make a bundle off the car, leaving the others in shock, except for Pig, who stupidly thinks Eddie won.
45b	19b	"Beady and the Beasts"	T.J. Sullivan	Tom Sheppard	June 19, 2010
Mrs. Beady has no choice but to move with the barnyard animals after being kicked out of her house and being mistreated by Mr. Beady's mother, Mother Beady. After being annoyed by Mrs. Beady's antics, Otis dresses up as Mrs. Beady's mother in order to get Mother Beady out of the house.
46a	20a	"Mission: Save Bigfoot"	T.J. Sullivan	Dan Serafin	September 11, 2010
The animals climb a mountain to reach Bigfoot's home after Bigfoot gets in an accident.
46b	20b	"Mrs. Beady Takes a Holiday"	Tom Grevera & Todd Grimes	Gene Grillo	September 11, 2010
The animals successfully prank Mrs. Beady into taking a holiday. Now, they no longer have to worry about getting caught by her, but now Otis experiences withdrawal symptoms because he is no longer able to prank her.
47a	21a	"Clonedemonium"	T.J. Sullivan	Jed Spingarn	September 18, 2010
The clones Little Otis and Little Abby come back to visit the barnyard, but it becomes a problem because they never sleep so the animals couldn't sleep when they're here. In order to make them stop visiting, they try to create mini-clones of Pig, Pip, Freddy, and Peck so Little Otis and Little Abby can have friends. A problem arises when the owner of the Clone-a-torium plans to use the clones to expose the humans so they would know that animals can talk (with the owner learning such after Tiny Pig talked to him upon his creation), and Otis and his friends must stop him from doing so.
47b	21b	"Hickory Dickory Donkey"	Tom Grevera & Todd Grimes	Tom Sheppard	September 18, 2010
When a beautiful she-donkey named Prunella takes an interest in Pip, Bessy suspects ulterior motives and follows them on their dates, causing the other animals to accuse her of being jealous. Bessy's instincts prove to be right as Prunella was using Pip to make her boyfriend jealous. Now Bessy must save Pip from being annihilated by Prunella's angry boyfriend Thor in to destroy Pip.
48	22	"Treasure Hunt"	Todd Grimes	Tom Sheppard	September 12, 2011 (Nicktoons)
French Canadian Crows want to steal the corn from the barnyard, but after repeated failed attempts, they decide to give the animals a fake treasure map to distract them from guarding the corn and Everett must try to stop the crows steals the corn.
49a	23a	"Clown and Out"	T.J. Sullivan	Tom Sheppard	September 19, 2011 (Nicktoons)
While trying to escape Snotty Boy, the animals run over Snotty Boy's clown father. His dad survived, but has lost a lot of hilarity and Pig takes him into surgery. Otis disguises himself as Snotty Boy's father to distract him while he recovers and becomes a cool dad to Snotty Boy. Only Snotty Boy comes to love and admire Otis in a way he never did for his lame clown father. Otis has to think fast before he ruins this miserable family.
49b	23b	"Clan of the Cave Cow"	Nick Simotas & Todd Grimes	Gene Grillo	September 19, 2011 (Nicktoons)
An ancient cave cow comes to attack the barn animals. Meanwhile, scientists kidnap Otis, thinking he's really Cave Cow.
50a	24a	"Four Leaf Otis"	Tom Grevera & Todd Grimes	Dan Serafin	September 26, 2011 (Nicktoons)
It is St Patrick's Day, when a leprechaun steals the farmer's potatoes after Otis sprayed the potatoes, Otis and pals must stop him before the farmer goes bankrupt and the animals for less outlet. Unfortunately, also, the leprechaun turns Freddy and Peck into shamrocks and Pig into a corn beef sandwich head. Luckily, Otis gets an idea to cut out the middle man meaning to find the leprechaun's gold instead of catching him to surrender.
50b	24b	"Cop Cow"	T.J. Sullivan	Tom Sheppard	September 26, 2011 (Nicktoons)
When Officer O'Hanlon is hurt, Otis and his friends become cops after another cop gets injured, and they try to solve a crime that is about stealing in the donut store. They find the suspects are Snotty Boy, Mrs. Beady and the Farmer. They try to interrogate them, but they're all innocent. They then learn that Pig is the real thief because he wore a burglar costume every time he goes to get donuts for his friends.
51a	25a	"Plucky and Me"	Tom Grevera	Dan Serafin	October 3, 2011 (Nicktoons)
Otis finds a giant chicken egg and decides to hatch it so they can have a fifth for polo. The giant chicken egg turns out to be that of a dinosaur, which proceeds to wreak havoc wherever it goes. The animals want to get rid of it, but Otis has paternal feelings and begs the animals to give him a chance. They relent, but things truly go awry when the dinosaur quickly grows a thousand times its size and falls in love with Mrs. Beady.
51b	25b	"Pig of the Mole People"	Tom Grevera & Todd Grimes	Gene Grillo	October 3, 2011 (Nicktoons)
Pig's mole subjects (from when he was Emperor of the Mole People for 45 minutes as mentioned in a brief line from "Get Bessy") have sought him out to return as their Emperor and defend them from Eric the Terrible, a verbally abusive worm and with the mole people around the barnyard, they can't get Pig to hang out with them because they keep shocking them when they are near Pig.
52	26	"Aliens!!!"	T.J. Sullivan & Todd Grimes	Gene Grillo	November 12, 2011 (Nicktoons) (Note: This episode was first released on the Back at the Barnyard: Season 2 DVD on November 1, 2011.)
In the series finale, Otis orders a satellite dish online in order to watch monkey boxing from Rio. Mrs. Beady sees this and believes that he is secretly signaling aliens. Otis finds out and tries to prank Mrs. Beady with a fake alien invasion broadcast. This broadcast is sent to real aliens who are attracted to Earth and plan to conquer and destroy the planet. The animals must stop and stall them while they figure out their weakness. They soon learn that the aliens melt when they come in contact with milk and use that to scare the aliens away.

== Home media ==
Back at the Barnyard home video releases
Season	Episodes	Years active	Release dates	
Season	Episodes	Years active	Region 1	Region 4
1	26	2007–09	When No One's Looking: August 5, 2008; Episodes: "The Good, the Bad, and the Snotty" – "The Farmer Takes a Woman" Cowman: The Uddered Avenger: January 20, 2009; Episodes: "Hypno A-Go-Go" – "War of the Pranks" • "Cowman the Uddered Avenger" The Complete First Season: November 7, 2011 (Amazon exclusive)	Lights, Camera, Moo!: June 2, 2011; Episodes: "Lights, Camera, Moo!" • "Raging Cow" • "Otis Season" • "Big Top Barnyard" Club Otis: July 28, 2011; Episodes: "Pigmalion" • "Meet the Ferrets" • "Club Otis" • "Barnyard Idol"
2	26	2009–11	The Complete Second Season: November 1, 2011 (Amazon exclusive); Note: The episodes "Paging Dr. Filly" and "Aliens!!!" from this season were unaired at the time of when this DVD was released. The episode "Paging Dr. Filly" aired 4 days later on November 5, 2011, and the episode "Aliens!!!" aired 11 days later on November 12, 2011.	—N/a
Special features
When No One's Looking (Region 1): "Cowman and Ratboy" / "The Right Cow" animatics Cowman: The Uddered Avenger (Region 1): "Cowman: The Uddered Avenger" animatic Lights, Camera, Moo! (Region 4): Bonus episode: SpongeBob SquarePants: "Blackened Sponge" / "Mermaid Man vs. SpongeBob" Club Otis (Region 4): Bonus episode: SpongeBob SquarePants: "A Flea in Her Dome" / "The Donut of Shame"
