= Salvatore D. Romano =

Italian American Mobster

Salvatore "Sal the Pizza Guy" Romano (born May 27, 1967) is a former member of the Gambino crime family and their operative on Wall Street, making millions of dollars for the Gambinos by way of stock fraud, first serving under John "Johnny G" Gammarano and later becoming a top earner for Michael "Mikey Scars" DiLeonardo, a capo in the Gambino crime family who was at one time considered a possible successor to John Gotti as boss of the family.

"Arguably one of the wealthiest gangsters in American mob history", Romano was indicted in a nearly $100 million stock scam in 2003. Romano decided to cooperate and become a government informant in exchange for admittance into the U.S. Witness Protection Program and is currently preparing to publish his autobiographical memoir.

== Early life ==
Salvatore Dominic Romano was born in the Bensonhurst neighbourhood of the New York City borough of Brooklyn, and grew up in the New Springville neighbourhood of Staten Island. Romano's father, Dominic Romano Sr., was an associate of the Gambino crime family. A "college-educated businessman as well as a tough guy," Romano's father "was around Frank DeCicco". Frank "Frankie D" or "Frankie Cheech" DeCicco was the underboss for the Gambino crime family until he was killed by a car bomb that was meant not only for him but also for John J. Gotti.

Romano attended the Staten Island campus of St. John's University before he began working on Wall Street in 1985, when he obtained a position as an assistant broker with Lehman Brothers, where he outperformed "everyone in the sales department".

In 1988, Romano began working at F.D. Roberts Securities, a small brokerage firm based in Paramus, New Jersey. The firm was "on record" with Joseph "Joe Butch" Corrao, the "legendary Gambino gangster from Mulberry Street. Within three months, Romano was promoted to assistant sales manager. Within five months, he was named branch manager," a position that was also coveted by Jordan Belfort of The Wolf of Wall Street. Both competed for the position, with Romano outperforming Belfort.

By the age of 21, Romano was making around $50,000 a month until federal authorities closed down F.D. Roberts Securities. Government investigators discovered that the firm's partners "pressured the sales staff through fear, intimidation and the promise of outlandish commissions to make hundreds of client calls daily and to use information they knew was false and inaccurate to promote selected stocks".

Staff members below the firm's partners were not exposed to criminal wrongdoing, enabling Romano to open his own franchised brokerage firm in 1990. The firm did extremely well, with Romano illegally controlling small cap stocks "by dominating the ownership of equity positions in publicly traded companies" and then reselling the shares to retail investors at higher prices.

In 1992, both Romano and his father were "convicted of mail fraud and conspiracy", having been "charged with running a loan brokerage out of Willowbrook that scammed applicants of more than $1 million". Romano was sentenced to 30 months in prison and was "barred from the securities industry".

== Life in the mob ==
In 1994, Romano was transferred to a halfway house in the Bedford-Stuyvesant neighbourhood of Brooklyn, New York City, where he immediately began strategizing as to what he would do next. Now seen "as an earner who could keep his mouth shut and do his time", Romano "was wearing a badge of honor" and the Mafia began to take notice.

John "Johnny G" Gammarano, a soldier in the Gambino crime family, soon "requested a meeting with Romano at the Marriott Hotel in downtown Manhattan. The meeting proved to be quite risky. Romano was technically still in the Bureau of Prison's custody. As for Gammarano, "he was out on bail pending sentencing" for setting up "a $10 million scheme in which New Orleans mobsters cornered the market on the distribution of Joker Poker machines throughout Louisiana".

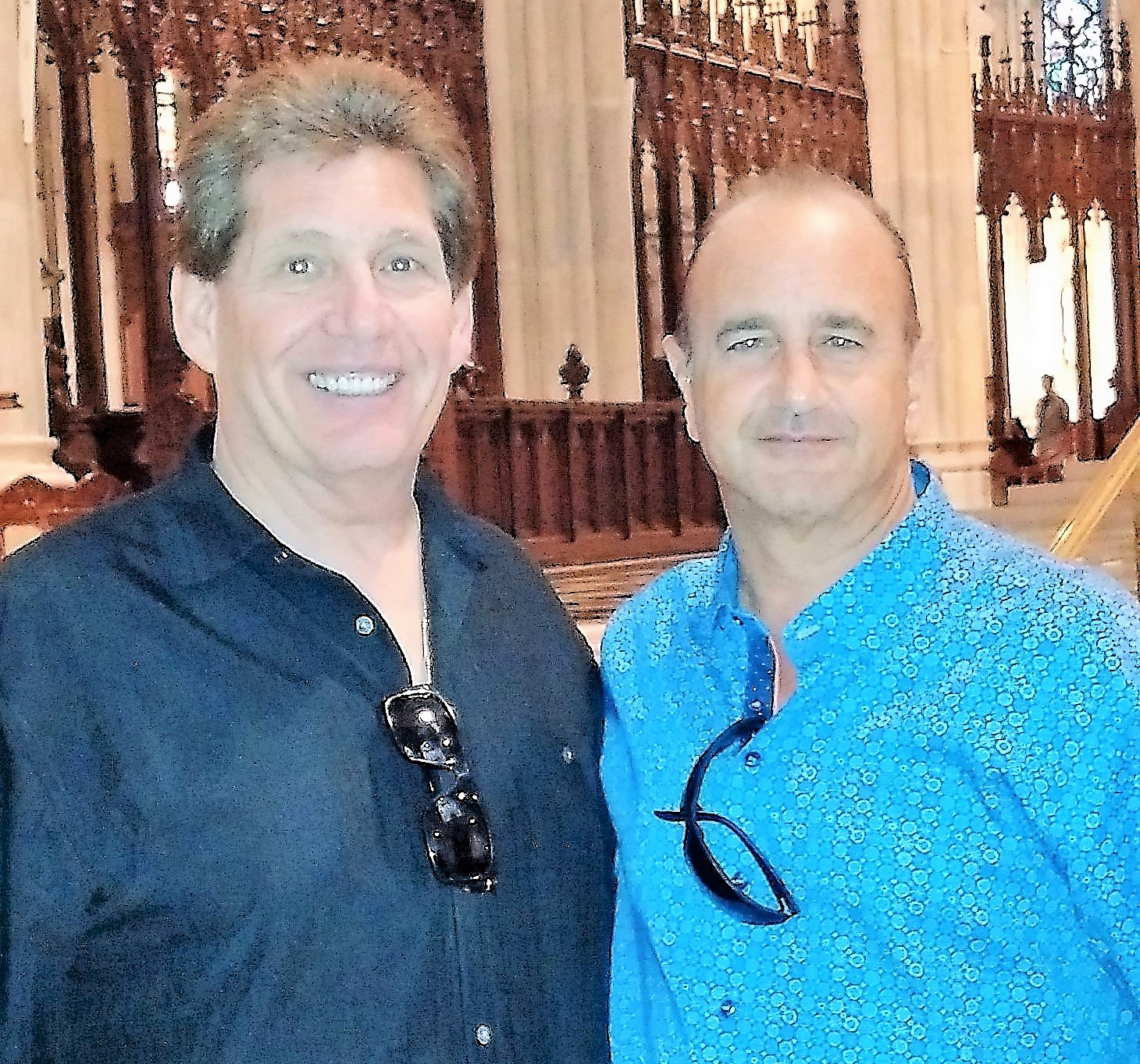
Michael “Mikey Scars” DiLeonardo and Salvatore “Sal the Pizza Guy” Romano, circa 2017.

Gammarano offered to finance Romano's projects going forward, creating a partnership between the two gangsters. One of these businesses tried to capitalize on opportunities created by the 1982 mandated break-up of the Bell System. Gammarano… offered to pay for the initial start-up investment "for which he'd receive 20 percent of all profits". When Gammarano went to prison in 1996, Romano, was then "on record" with Gammarano's direct superior and capo Michael "Mikey Scars" DiLeonardo.

For the next several years, Romano invested his illegitimate money into many legitimate business ventures, and lived "the good life on ill-gotten gains". Romano and his family "lived in a $5 million opulent Staten Island mansion" that he had built to include "hot spots" that allowed him "to safely store as much as $2 million in cash" at any given time. Romano and his family "enjoyed all the perks of an affluent lifestyle".

Romano would go on to forge a very close friendship with music legend Paul Anka, who wrote My Way for Frank Sinatra and would later rewrite the song as Sal's Way, using the same melody but with new lyrics. "Anka sang Sal's Way at a premiere party for one of Romano's business ventures".

== "The Pizza Guy" ==
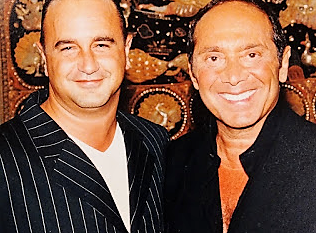
Salvatore “Sal the Pizza Guy” Romano with Paul Anka in Las Vegas, 1999.

Romano was never referred to as "the pizza guy" by the mob or people in "the street". This unofficial nickname was coined in 2007 by American journalist and author Gerald "Jerry" Capeci, in an article that appeared in The New York Sun, and based on court testimony.

Years earlier, Romano had been on parole and Joey D'Angelo, a Gambino soldier in Mikey Scars' crew, was on home confinement. Since meeting with D'Angelo would be a violation of his home confinement, Romano went to his home in an old beat-up car and disguised as a pizza delivery person, carrying a pizza box filled with messages. D'Angelo testified about this in open trial, saying Romano had looked "just like a pizza deliveryman".

== Flip ==
In 2003, Romano was indicted in a nearly $100 million stock scam. "Betrayed by the disloyalty of those he had always believed were his ‘family', and faced with both State and Federal charges", and knowing that "Mikey Scars" DiLeonardo, his friend and mentor, who had agreed to cooperate with the government six months earlier, would no doubt have to unwillingly cooperate against him, Romano decided to cooperate himself and become a government informant in exchange for admittance into the U.S. Witness Protection Program.

In 2005, Romano was listed as a witness in the racketeering case in which John A. Gotti "Junior" was charged with securities fraud. Romano was "never called by prosecutors" who instead decided to rely "on Romano's admitted front man, […] to describe the stock fraud scheme". Michael "Mikey Scars" DiLeonardo also detailed Gotti's "alleged participation in the securities fraud". However, jurors obviously dismissed this testimony as "they acquitted [Gotti] on that charge".

"Ironically, prosecutors decided against using testimony from Romano because they thought they were winning the case and ‘it wasn't needed', recalled one member of the team".This was seen as a "fatal omission" on the part of the federal government.

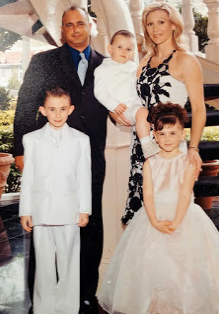
Salvatore “Sal the Pizza Guy” Romano with his family.

Romano also fingered mobsters John "Johnny G" Gammarano, William "Big Billy" Scotto, Peter Gotti, Michael "Mikey Scars" DiLeonardo, and Joseph "Little Joe" D'Angelo "as partners who shared up to $5 million of the cash that he generated in his far-reaching schemes".

== Current life ==
In 2017, Romano and some members of his family appeared in the documentary series Mafia Women with Trevor McDonald, which aired on February 16 and 23 on the ITV network in the United Kingdom. The documentary consisted of two hour-long episodes, "the aim of [which] was to offer a detailed look at the lives of women who married mobsters—or had them for fathers and brothers". Romano has recently signed with Silicon Valley–based Fuse Literary Agency for representation as he prepares to publish his autobiographical memoir. In addition to being autobiographical, Romano's memoir will also describe "in great detail how the Mafia took control of the NASDAQ small cap stock market during the Internet boom of the late 1990s", as well as details "the beginning of the end of the Gotti family's control of the Gambino crime family".
