= Bankara =

- Location in Central African Republic
- Coordinates: 6°39′N 16°51′E
- Country: Central African Republic
- Prefecture: Ouham
- Sub-Prefecture: Bossangoa
- Commune: Ouham Bac

Bankara is a village in the Ouham region in the Central African Republic.

Nearby towns and villages include Benesa (1.0 nm), Botokoni (2.2 nm) and Bouasi (2.2 nm) .
