= A Humpty Dumpty Thing =

Studio album by Jim Bob
- Released: 2007
- Genre: Indie punk
- Label: Cherry Red

Jim Bob chronology
School (2006)	A Humpty Dumpty Thing (2007)	Goffam (2009)

A Humpty Dumpty Thing is the title of the 2007 solo album by Jim Bob, formerly of Carter the Unstoppable Sex Machine. It was released on Cherry Red Records and included a free book. "The story is set in the not-too-distant future when all art is commissioned by the State. It's about a man chosen to write an 80,000-word novel or face a jail term. He's never written anything before and finds himself with instant writer's block."

== Track listing ==
1. "All the King's Horses"
2. "Cartoon Dad"
3. "Every Day When I Come Home I Expect to Find You Gone"
4. "God's Blog"
5. "Robin, Patrik and Chris"
6. "Another Day at the Office"
7. "The Carousel"
8. "This Phoney War"
9. "Pizza Boy"
10. "Battling the Bottle (Fighting the Flab, At War with the World)"
11. "Why Can't We Get Along?"
12. "From This Moment"
13. "The I Can't Face the World Today Blues"
