= Boda, Lobaye =

Boda
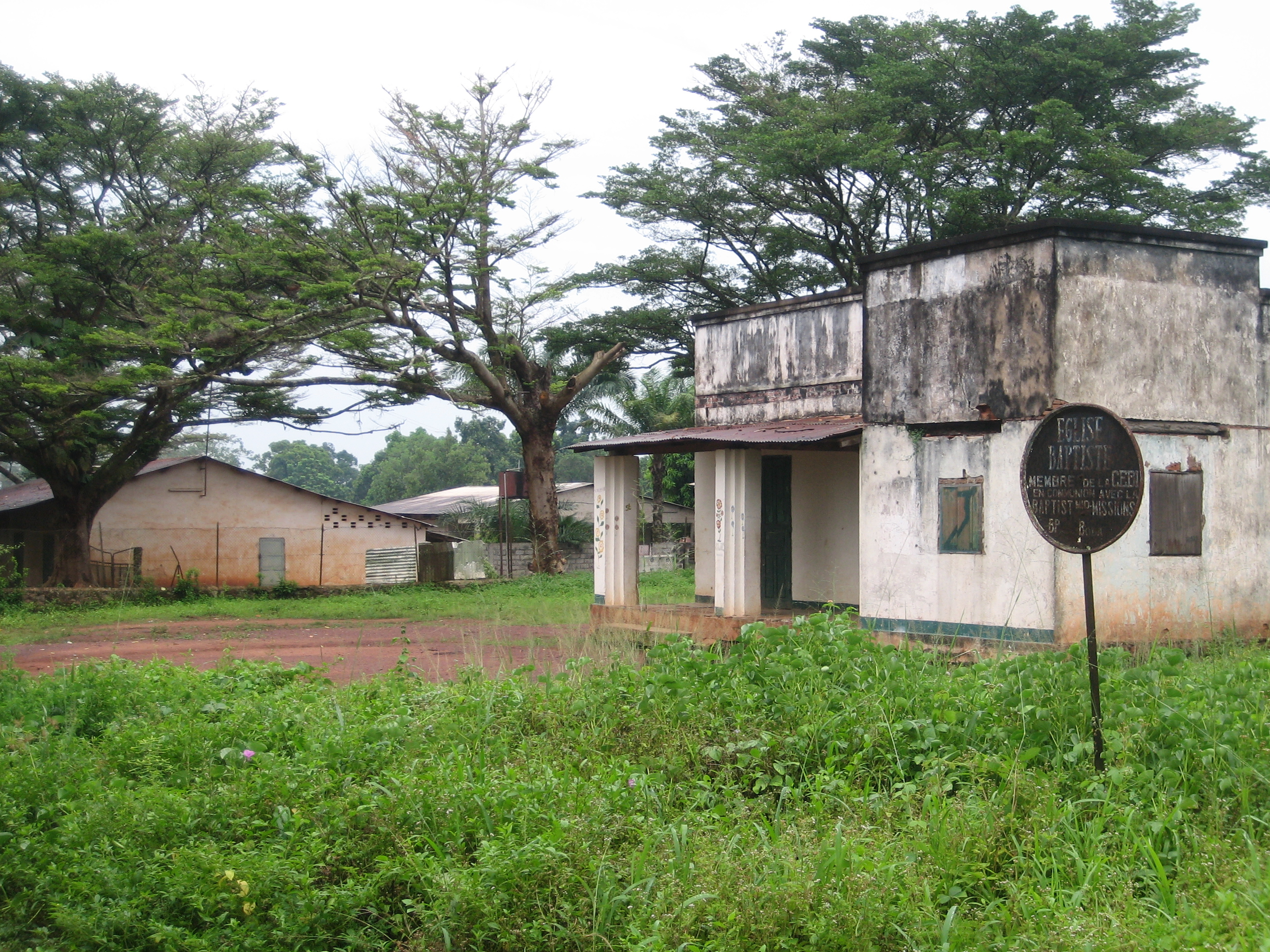
- Baptist church in Boda.

- Location in Central African Republic
- Coordinates: 4°19′N 17°28′E
- Country: Central African Republic
- Prefecture: Lobaye
- Sub-Prefecture: Boda

Government
  - Sub-Prefect: Crépin Dambale
  - Mayor: Aimé Barthélémy Pilapédé

Boda is a town located in the Central African Republic prefecture of Lobaye.

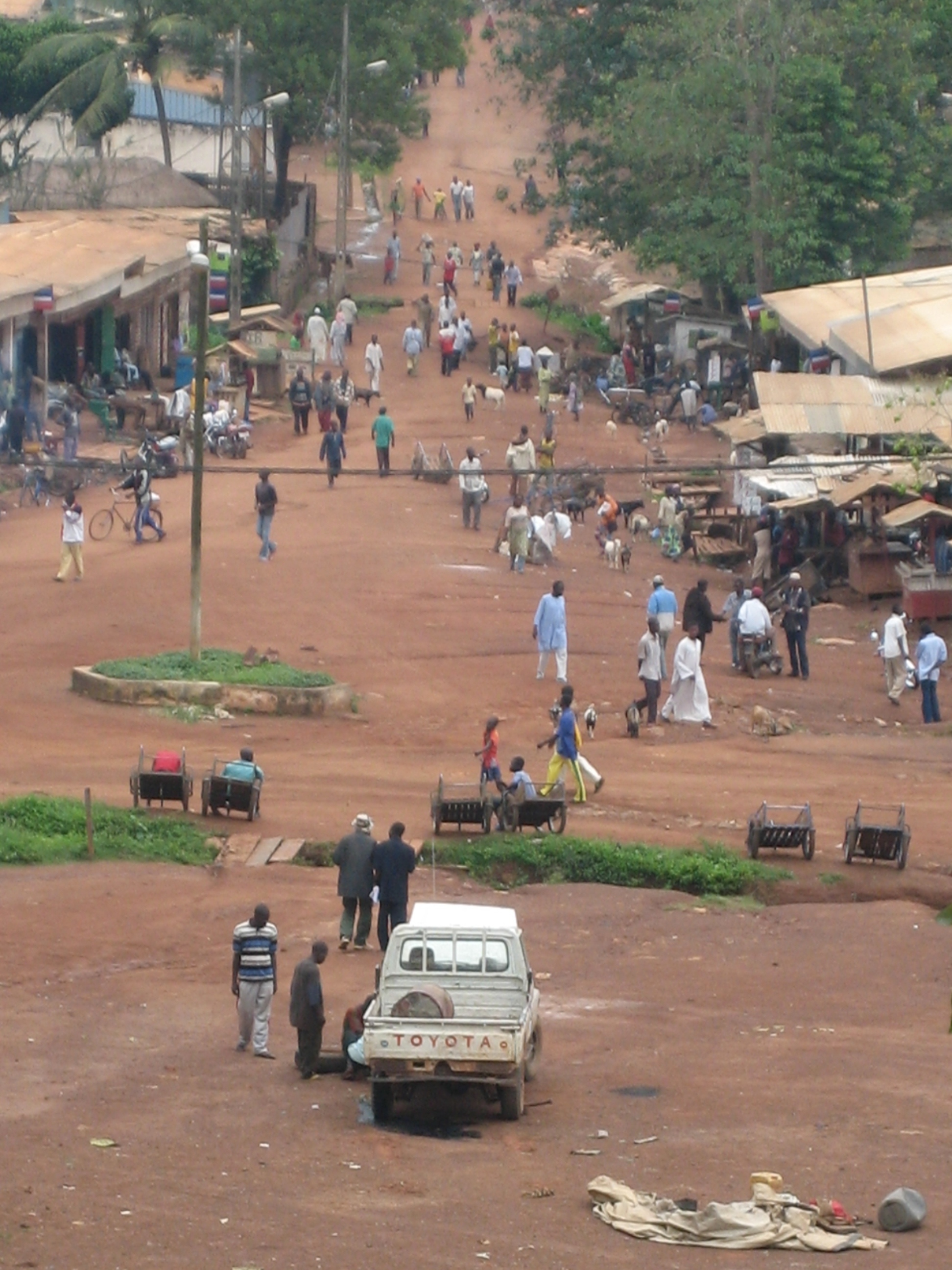
The central market in Boda.

== History ==
France ceded Boda to Germany on 1 June 1913 under the Morocco–Congo Treaty. One year later, French captured Boda from Germany during World War I on 16 August 1914.

Together with Paoua, Boda was electrified in 1994.

On 29 January 2014 Anti-balaka took control of Boda following Seleka withdrawal. In September 2016 Boda was declared to be free from rebel groups. In August 2017 it was reported that the town was under control of security forces following withdrawal of international forces three months before. On 18 December 2020 Boda was captured by rebels from Coalition of Patriots for Change. It was recaptured by government forces on 24 January 2021.
