= Mariagrazia Pizza =

Vaccine researcher and academic

Mariagrazia Pizza MAE
- Born: Eboli, Italy
- Education: University of Naples Federico II
- Awards: EMBO Member (2000)
- Scientific career
- Fields: Vaccines; Pathogenesis
- Workplaces: Imperial College London; GSK plc; European Molecular Biology Laboratory; Novartis; University of Leicester

Mariagrazia Pizza MAE is an Italian vaccine researcher who is a professor at Imperial College London. She worked as Senior Scientific Director for Bacterial Vaccines at GSK plc. She was involved with the development of the first pertussis vaccine. In 2023, she was awarded the IVI-SK bioscience Park MahnHoon Award.

== Early life and education ==
Pizza was born in Eboli, Italy and lived there until 1980. She studied chemistry and pharmaceutical science at the University of Naples Federico II. Her dissertation used nuclear magnetic resonance to explore the structure of opioid peptides. When a family member became ill, she decided to learn more about pharmaceutical design. She moved to the European Molecular Biology Laboratory in Heidelberg, where she learnt molecular biology and engineering.

== Research and career ==
Pizza has focused on the design and development of new vaccines. In 1986, she joined Sclavo, a vaccine research centre in Siena. She spent six years there, contributing to the development of the first pertussis vaccine that involved a genetically-detoxified pertussis toxin, which was able to protect infants, and was safer and more immuno-active than other pertussis vaccines on the market. Sclavo was sold to Chiron, which was eventually acquired by Novartis. Motivated by their success and advances in whole genome sequencing, Pizza started working on a Meningococcal vaccine. She joined GSK plc in 2016.

In 2023, Pizza joined the faculty at Imperial College London. She is an Honorary Visiting Professor at the University of Leicester.

=== Awards and honours ===
- 2000 Elected a member of the European Molecular Biology Organization (EMBO)
- 2018 Elected a Member of the Academia Europaea (MAE)
- 2023 IVI-SK bioscience Park MahnHoon Award
- 2026 Elected a Fellow of the Academy of Medical Sciences

=== Selected publications ===
- M Pizza; Vincenzo Scarlato; V Masignani; et al. (1 March 2000). "Identification of vaccine candidates against serogroup B meningococcus by whole-genome sequencing". Science. 287 (5459): 1816–1820. doi:10.1126/science.287.5459.1816. ISSN 0036-8075. PMID 10710308. Wikidata Q33892877.
- H Tettelin; N J Saunders; J Heidelberg; et al. (1 March 2000). "Complete genome sequence of Neisseria meningitidis serogroup B strain MC58". Science. 287 (5459): 1809–1815. doi:10.1126/science.287.5459.1809. ISSN 0036-8075. PMID 10710307. Wikidata Q22065549.
- Marzia M Giuliani; Jeannette Adu-Bobie; Maurizio Comanducci; et al. (6 July 2006). "A universal vaccine for serogroup B meningococcus". Proceedings of the National Academy of Sciences of the United States of America. 103 (29): 10834–10839. Bibcode:2006PNAS..10310834G. doi:10.1073/pnas.0603940103. ISSN 0027-8424. PMC 2047628. PMID 16825336. Wikidata Q36101910.

== Personal life ==
Pizza has two beloved cats, Audrey and Tiffany, and two children.
