= Boganangone =

Coordinates: 4°41′N 17°12′E

- sub-prefectures
- Location in Central African Republic
- Country: Central African Republic

Government
  - Sub-prefect: Angèle Semkomana

Boganangone is a sub-prefecture of Lobaye in the Central African Republic.

== Geography ==
Boganangone is located 145 km north of Mbaïki. In 2003, the sub-prefecture has 24,322 inhabitants.

== History ==
The administrative post of Boganangone becomes the 5th sub-prefecture of the prefecture of Lobaye from May 2, 2002.

== Administration ==
Boganangone is the only commune of the sub-prefecture.
