= Bobili =

- Location in Central African Republic
- Coordinates: 6°45′N 16°51′E
- Country: Central African Republic
- Prefecture: Ouham
- District: Bossangoa

Bobili is a village in the Ouham region in the Central African Republic.

Nearby towns and villages include Bondia Kete (3.0 nm), Bonase Kete (10.3 nm), Padang (5.8 nm), Vora (5.0 nm) and Bankara (6.0 nm).
