= Mr. Pizza =

South Korean pizza chain

Mr.Pizza, Inc.
- Type: Public company (KOSDAQ-listed; majority owned by Pelicana-backed private equity fund since 2020)
- Industry: Restaurants
- Founded: (1990; 36 years ago)
- Founder: Jung Woo Hyun
- Headquarters: 132 Hyoryeong-ro, Seocho-gu, Seoul, South Korea 137-849,
- Number of locations: 400 (Korea); 28 (worldwide in 2013)
- Key people: Jung Woo Hyun (founder; chairman until 2017); Moon Young Joo (CEO)
- Products: Pizza, pasta, salad, appetizer
- Number of employees: 250+
- Website: www.mrpizza.co.kr

Mr. Pizza Inc. (Korean: 미스터피자) is a South Korean pizza chain established in 1990. It began as a franchise partner of a Japanese pizza brand of the same name, then seeking expansion into the Korean market; Jung Woo-hyun purchased the brand from the Japanese owner in 1996, acquiring full rights to the trademark outside Japan. It is the top pizza brand in Korea in terms of the number of franchisees and sales.

Mr. Pizza has won recognition overseas. In 2009, 2010, and 2011, China's restaurant review site Dazhong Dianping (大衆點評) included it as one of the "50 Restaurants Beloved by Chinese Diners;" further, the restaurant guide Zagat named it the "Best Pizza Store".

Mr. Pizza was the first pizza franchise to be listed on KOSDAQ;in 2013, the chain had 400 outlets inside Korea and 28 stores in China, two in the United States and two in Vietnam. Mr. Pizza's first overseas restaurant had opened in Beijing, China, in 2000, and the chain reached its 100th location in China by October 2015.

In 2010, the brand of Mr. Pizza in Japan was also fully acquired.

== Overview ==
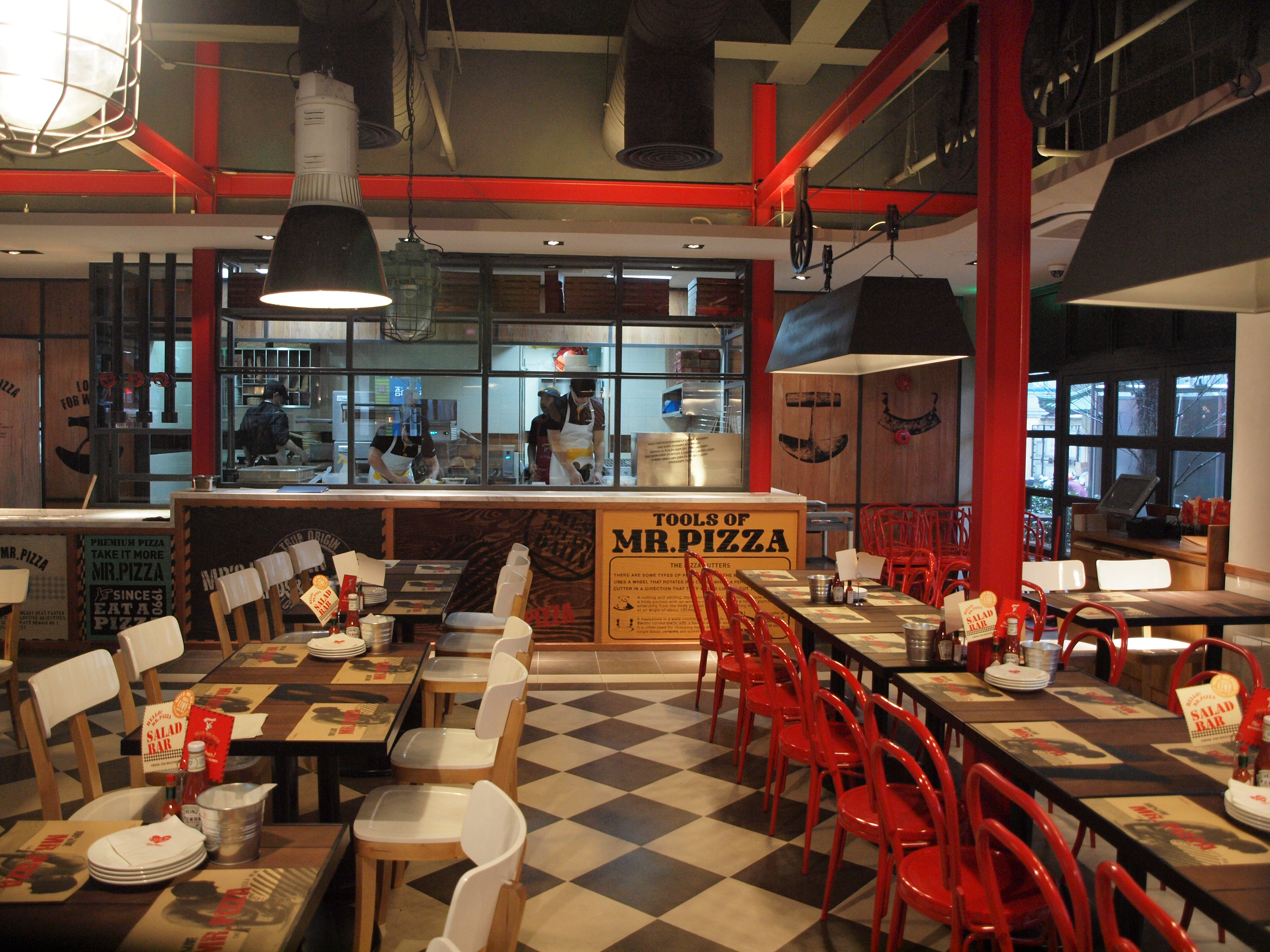
The Shanghai Ruzhonlu store, 2013

The founder and chairman of Mr. Pizza was Jung Woo Hyun (정우현). He stepped down on June 26, 2017, amid controversies including allegations that he purposely opened competing stores near former franchisees to obstruct their businesses, and charges of forcing franchisees to purchase cheese from relatives at above-market prices. Jung was subsequently arrested in July 2017 for alleged embezzlement and malpractice.

MPK Group was listed on KOSDAQ in August 2009 from Korea Pizza Corporation. In December 2018, the Korea Exchange's corporate evaluation committee moved to delist MP Group from KOSDAQ, citing sustained operating losses every quarter since 2015, accounting irregularities, and governance controversies tied to the former chairman's arrest.

=== New store identity ===
Mr. Pizza developed a new store identity to strengthen its foothold in the global market and unveiled it at the opening of a Fuzhoulu location in Shanghai in March 2013.

=== Advertising ===
Mr. Pizza's September 2011 mockumentary-style commercial, "The True Origins of Pizza", had more than a million views on YouTube. It received high praise and in-depth analysis in a journal article by two New Zealand-based Asian studies professors. They stated that "the level of skill and irony that went into its making is noteworthy among commercial ads anywhere".

== MPK Group Inc. ==
MPK Group Inc. is a restaurant company with a selection of premium brands including "Mr. Pizza", a handmade muffin and coffee franchise, "Manoffin", and "Jessica's Kitchen" Italian buffet restaurants. In November 2020, a private equity fund backed by fried chicken franchise Pelicana Chicken closed an approximately 20 billion won ($18.1 million) deal to acquire a controlling stake in MP Group, aiming to stabilize operations and avert delisting from KOSDAQ.
