= Mister Pizza =

Brazilian pizza restaurant chain

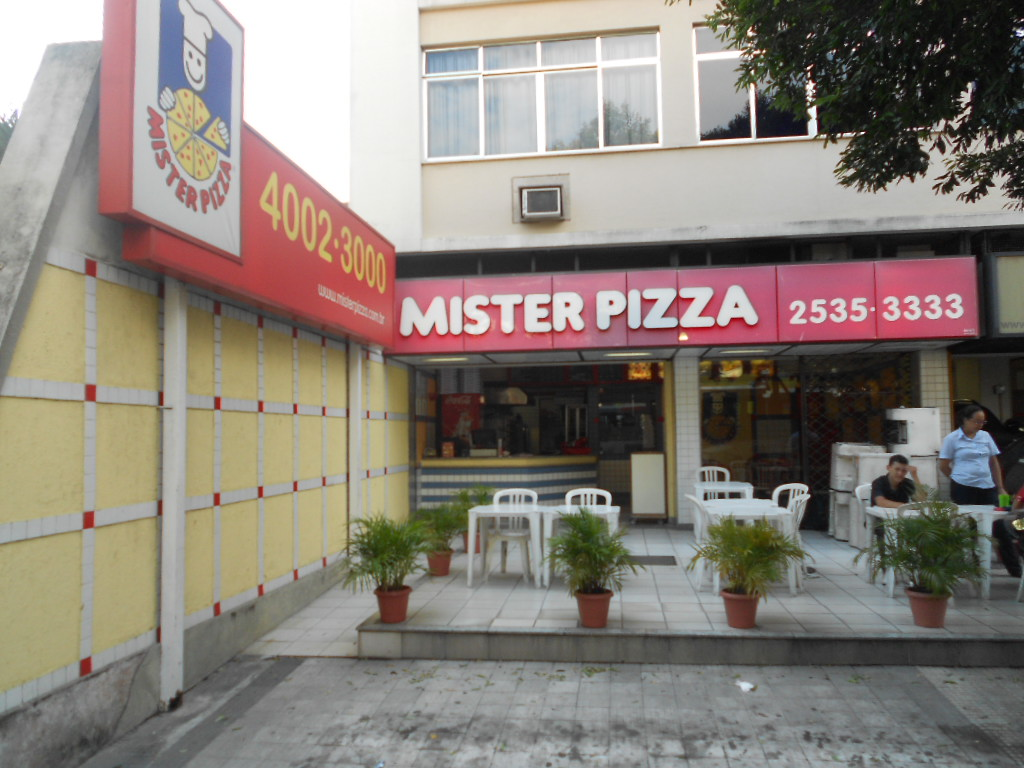
A Mister Pizza in Botafogo.

Mister Pizza (Portuguese pronunciation: [ˈmiʃteʁ ˈpitsɐ]) is one of the largest chains of pizzerias in Brazil. The company was founded in 1981 by Mayer Ambar, Luiz Ambar, Álvaro Feio, Charles Saba and Carlos Galvão.

Headquartered in Rio de Janeiro, there are more than 50 stores, distributed in several Brazilian states. Mister Pizza was the first franchiser in the business of foodservice in the country, the first franchise was opened in 1983 in Brasília.
