= Lobaye =

Prefecture of the Central African Republic

Coordinates: 4°00′N 18°00′E

- Prefecture
- Lobaye in the Central African Republic

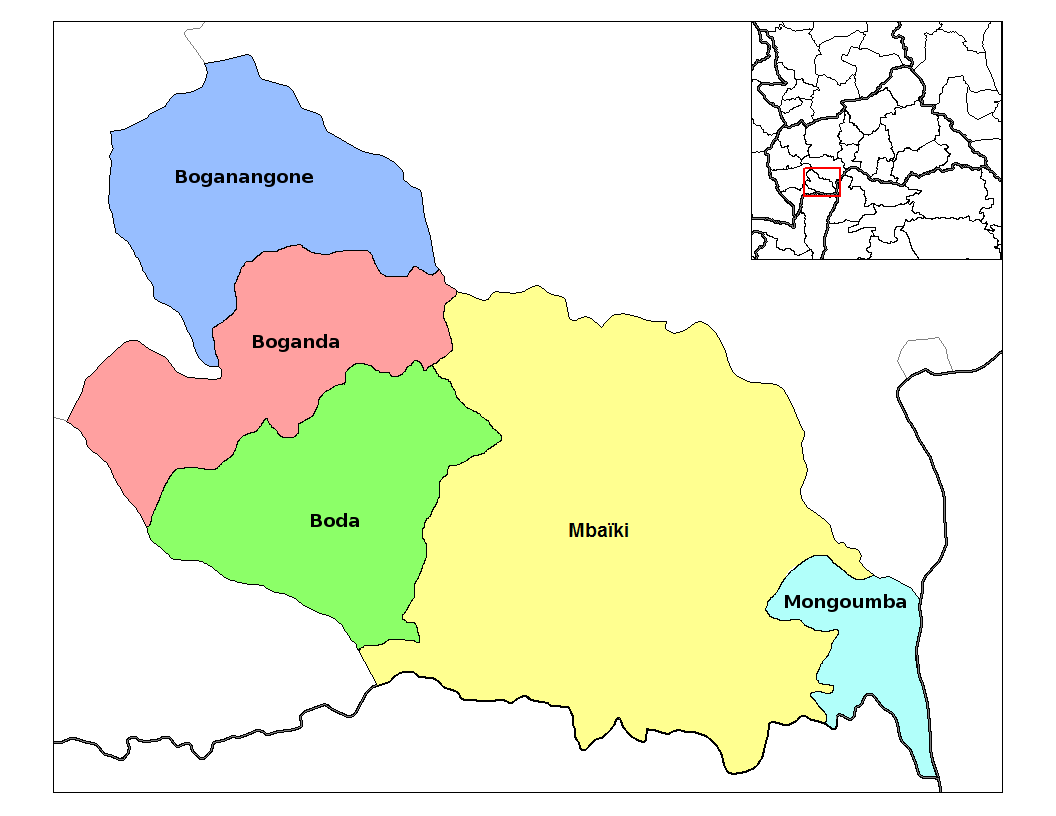
- Sub-prefectures of Lobaye
- Country: Central African Republic
- Capital: Mbaiki

Government
  - Prefect: Lydie Georgette Gahoro Soulou

Area
  - Total: 19,235 km^{2} (7,427 sq mi)

Population (2003 census)
  - Total: 246,875
  - Estimate (2024 estimation): 361,289

Lobaye [lo.bɛ] is one of the 20 prefectures of the Central African Republic. Its capital is Mbaïki. In 2024, official estimates suggest the population reached 361,289 inhabitants.

Emperor Duy Tân of Vietnam died here on December 26, 1945 in a plane crash. David Dacko, the first and third president of the Central African Republic from 1960–1965 and 1979–1981, was from Lobaye.

== Location ==
The prefecture is located in the southern part of the country, bordering the Republic of the Congo and the Democratic Republic of the Congo. It shares borders with the prefectures of Mambéré-Kadéï to the northwest, Sangha-Mbaéré to the west, and Ombella-M'Poko to the northeast. It is named for the Lobaye River.

== Economy ==
Besides Mbaïki, other important cities include Boda, in the north, and Mongoumba, by the Ubangi River.

Most of the inhabitants are coffea farmers. Most of the farmers are extremely poor; most children do not go to college, and many die due to lack of medical care.

== Sub-prefectures ==
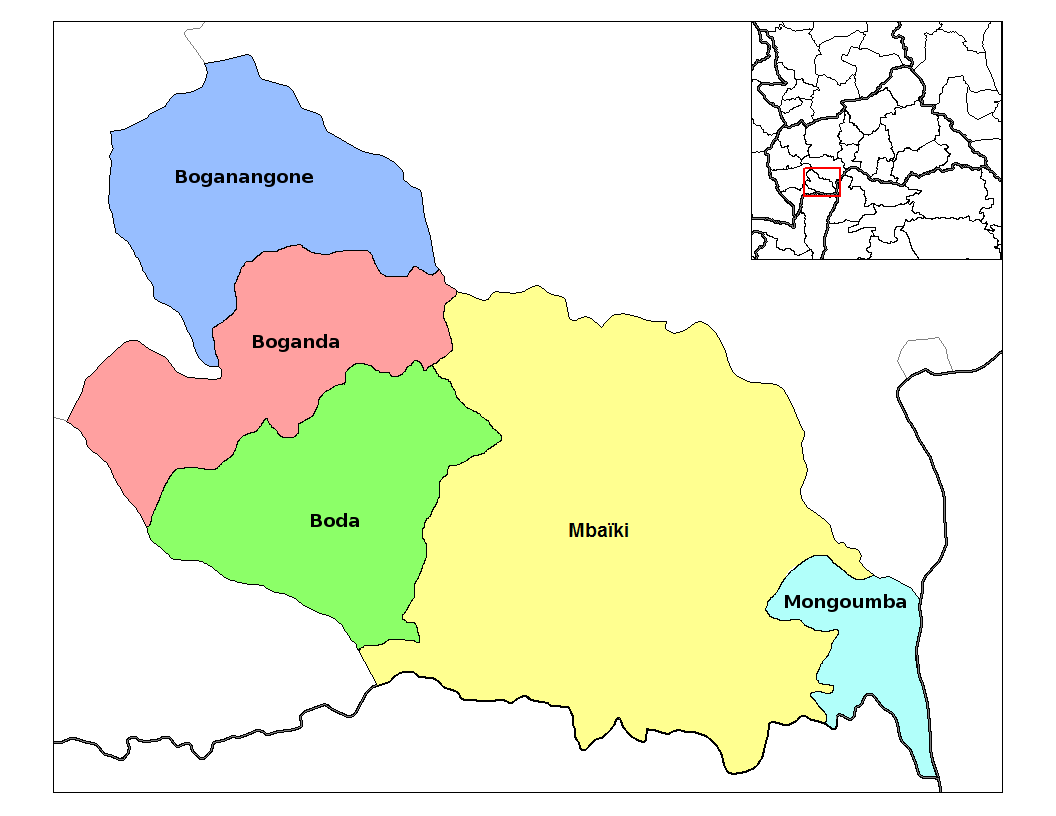
Sub-prefectures of Lobaye

- Boda
- Mbaiki
- Mongoumba
- Boganangone
- Boganda
