= N9 road (Central African Republic) =

Road in Central African Republic

N9 Road

Route information
- Maintained by Central African Republic National Highways Authority

Major junctions
- North end: Kongbo
- South end: Mobaye

Location
- Country: Central African Republic

Highway system
- Transport in the Central African Republic

The N9 road also designated as RN9, is a national route in Central African Republic with a total distance of 65 kilometers. The road connects the towns of Kongbo and Mobaye, providing a link between these two locations. As a relatively short route, the N9 plays a role in facilitating local travel and commerce within the region.

== Route ==
The N9 is a branch route of the N2, diverging from the village of Kongbo and extending to the town of Mobaye, situated on the Ubangi River, which forms the border with the Democratic Republic of Congo. On the Congolese side, the N24 continues, providing a cross-border connection. The N9 is a dirt road, traversing a relatively short distance of 65 kilometers, and plays a crucial role in facilitating local trade and travel between Kongbo and Mobaye, as well as connecting to the neighboring Democratic Republic of Congo.

== History ==
The history of the N9 route is not well-documented, and it is essentially a dirt road connecting the village of Mobaye, situated on the Ubangi River, to the N2. Efforts have been made to construct a bridge over the Ubangi River, but progress has been limited. In the late 1990s, a dam was built on the Congolese side of the river, and bridge pillars were erected in the river, but the bridge remains unfinished, lacking a deck. The completion date for the bridge is uncertain, leaving the transportation infrastructure in the region underdeveloped.
