= Boali =

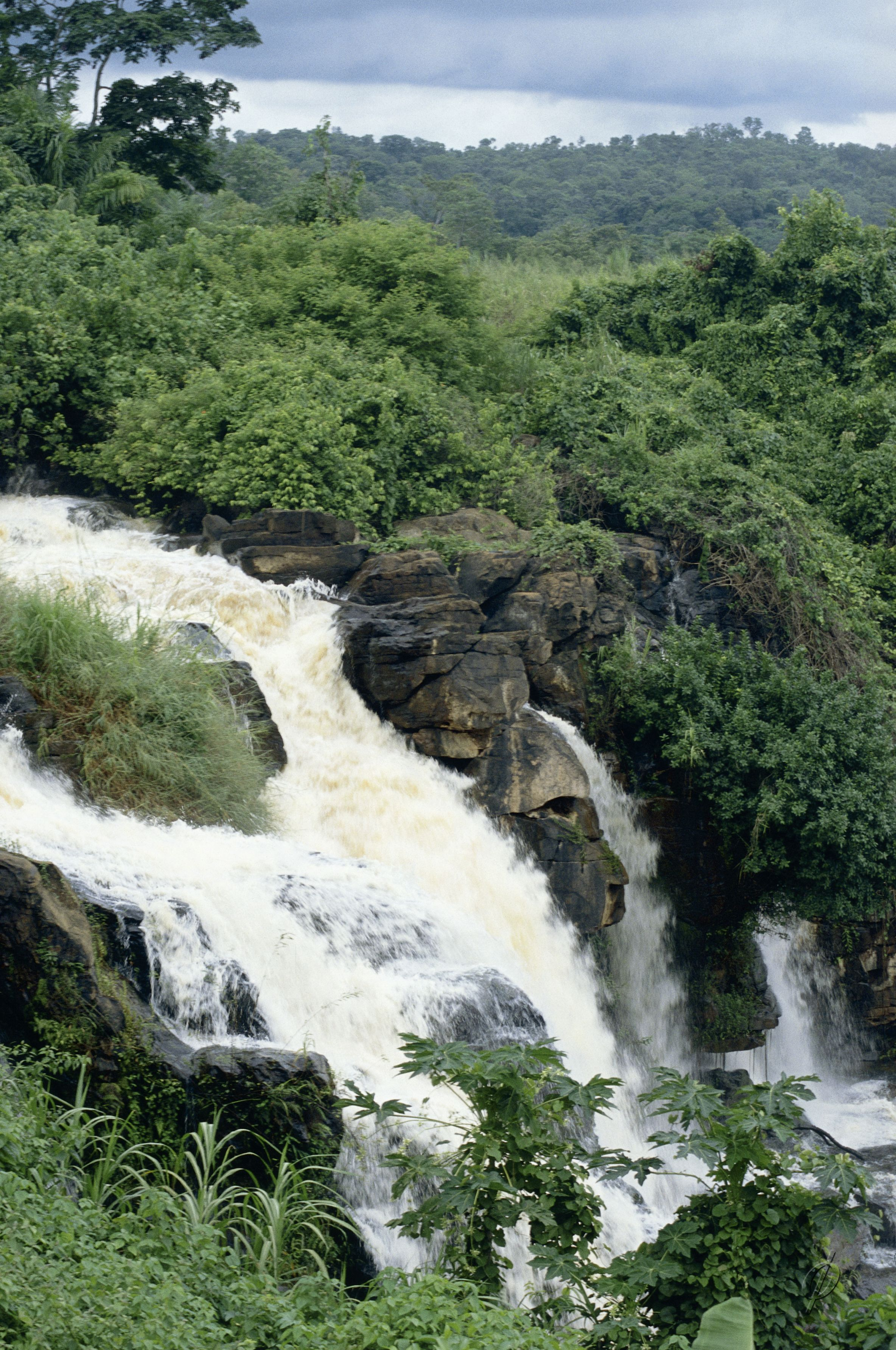
- The Falls of Boali

- Location in Central African Republic
- Coordinates: 4°48′N 18°7′E
- Country: Central African Republic
- Prefecture: Ombella-M'Poko

Government
  - Sub-Prefect: Solange Mokolomboka Soza Makanda
  - Mayor: Pierre Poutou

Population (2012)
  - Total: 9,314

Boali became the capital city of Ombella-M'Poko prefecture in Central African Republic on December 10 2020 after the former capital of Bimbo was incorporated into Bangui prefecture.

Boali is located on National Highway 1 (RN1), about 100 km (62 mi) northwest of the national capital, Bangui. The road is paved until Bossembélé where the paved section becomes the RN3 towards Bouar and Cameroon while the RN1 continues to Bossangoa, and ultimately to Chad.

Situated on the Mbali River, Boali is noted for its waterfalls and for the nearby hydroelectric works. The Falls of Boali are 250 m (820 ft) wide and 50 m (160 ft) high, and are a popular tourist destination.

The two units of the Boali Hydroelectric Power Station, Boali I and Boali II, are located below the falls. They have a combined generating power of 18.65 megawatts, and are operated by the state-run Enerca. The completion of Boali I in the 1950s spurred several other industrial developments in the town, including the country's first textile mill, which began operating in 1954.

The Boali hydroelectric works supply power to the capital and 13 other towns.

== History ==
Initial arrangements were made in 2010 for a third hydroelectric plant, Boali 3, to be built with Chinese assistance.

=== Civil war ===
This strategic role was used by the Seleka rebels in March 2013, who took over the plant on their way to Bangui and shut off power to the city. On 17 January 2014 Séléka withdrew from Boali. 300 anti-Balaka fighters entered town killing four civilians On 5 December 2015 the city was recaptured by government forces.

On 24 December 2020 rebels from Coalition of Patriots for Change attacked Boali. They were pushed back by government forces on 11 January 2021.

== See also ==
- List of waterfalls
