= Pavica =

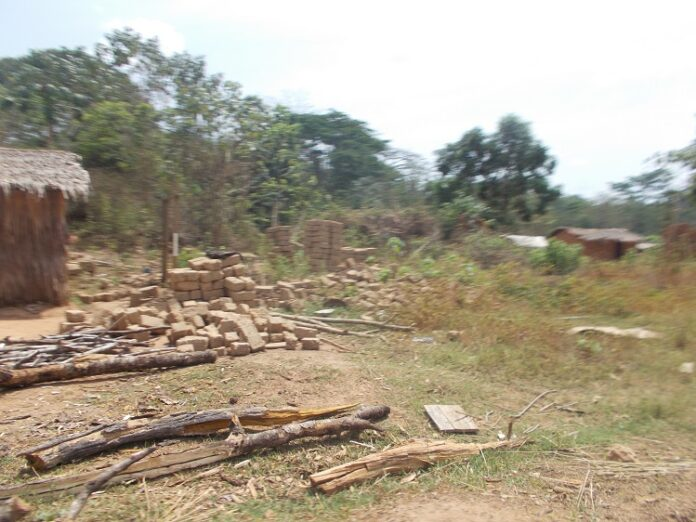

- Location in Central African Republic
- Coordinates: 4°55′6″N 21°19′32″E
- Country: Central African Republic
- Prefecture: Basse-Kotto
- Sub-prefecture: Alindao
- Commune: Guiligui

Pavica, also spelled Pavika, is a village situated in Basse-Kotto Prefecture, Central African Republic.

== History ==
UPC and Anti-balaka clashed in Pavica on 6 June 2017. Ten people were killed and five injured. More than 500 people fled to Alindao. A clash between two warring armed groups occurred in Pavica on 12 June. Four militias were injured and transferred to Alindao Health Center. The clash between two armed groups happened in Pavica on 25 August, resulting in casualties. Due to the attack, around 1,000 to 1,500 people sought refuge in MINUSCA base.

Anti-balaka militias stormed MINUSCA troops in the village on 23 August 2018, and one Burundian contingent was killed. UPC visited Pavica on 29 April 2021 to tell that they would attack Alindao. They then withdrew from the village, and FACA and Wagner seized it after hearing the presence of the rebels in it. FACA and Wagner, however, retreated from Pavica and UPC occupied the village again. They killed several people and burned houses before they left Pavica. Later, Wagner returned to the village and erected a checkpoint.

== Education ==
Pavica has one school.

== Healthcare ==
There is one health post in the village. On 5 August 2017, unknown gunmen killed the head of Pavica health post.
