= 2017 Alindao massacre =

Central African massacre

- Part of the Central African Republic Civil War
| Date | 7–9 May 2017 |
| Location | Alindao, Basse-Kotto, Central African Republic 5.0404°N 21.2095°E |
| Result | UPC victory |

Belligerents
| Union for Peace in the Central African Republic | Anti-balaka |

Commanders and leaders
| Ali Darassa | |

Casualties and losses
- 136+ people killed and 110+ people injured
- Location within Central African Republic

Between 7 and 9 May 2017 at least 136 civilians were killed in a series of reprisal killings by Anti-balaka and UPC fighters.

== Events ==
The clashes were triggered by arrest of two young boys by Muslim combatants who were accused of being part of self-defense group. Anti-balaka militias in response kidnapped family of a Séléka member to pressure group to release the boys. On 7 May shootout started between both groups. On 9 May UPC supported by local Muslims attacked Paris-Congo and Banguiville neighborhoods in Alindao. They conducted door-to-door searches, looking for men to kill and women and girls to rape. Human Rights Watch documented 12 cases of rape by UPC fighters in Alindao in May 2017. One woman described as fighters raped her and her husband and then murdered her husband and daughter with gunshots. Local UPC fighters were led by Ali Darassa. Bruno Bagaza, a Red Cross volunteer was killed by UPC fighters while wearing his uniform.

As UPC fighters managed to repel Anti-balaka attack on the town on 9 May, Anti-balaka fighters withdrew towards Mingala. According to unconfirmed reports around 10 churches were destroyed or looted in the surrounding villages as the rebels retreated.

=== Casualties ===
At least 136 people were killed. Some bodies were thrown into the wells. At least 19 of them (including an imam) were killed by Anti-balakas while at least 37 of them were killed by UPC fighters. At least 110 people were injured. 14,382 people reportedly took shelter at local Catholic mission. 329 houses had been burnt down.
