= Wantiguira, Nana-Mambéré =

Wantiguira
- Location in Central African Republic
- Coordinates: 5°55′56″N 15°38′42″E
- Country: Central African Republic
- Prefecture: Nana-Mambéré
- Sub-prefecture: Bouar
- Commune: Herman-Brousse

Wantiguira is a village located 5 km from Bouar in Nana-Mambéré Prefecture, Central African Republic.

== History ==
An alleged 3R rebels attacked pro-government militia, Special Mixed Security Units (USMS), training camp in Wantiguira on 9 June 2020. 3R managed to destroy the camp. The attack caused the death of five rebels and the injury of 17 USMS militias. FACA and MINUSCA troops arrived in the village on 9 June. Due to the attack, the locals fled to Bouar. More than 300 USMS militia set up barricades in Wantiguira on 10 November 2020 demanding the salary and bonus payment. Previously, the locals alerted the rebel's presence near the base to USMS a day before the attack.

Member of USMS militias erected a roadblock in the village protesting the salary arrears on 16 June 2021, causing the traffic disruption in N3 road.

A blast occurred in a restaurant in the village during lunchtime in early January 2024, resulting in three people being killed and others injured.

== Security ==
There used to be a checkpoint in the village manned by gendarmes, police officers, and Ministry of Water and Forests officials where they extorted passenger's money who did not bring an identity paper. The checkpoint was dismantled on 8 April 2024, which was welcomed by the locals whom they perceived as an obstacle. Apart from that, there is a USMS base and custom offices in Wantiguira.

== Healthcare ==
Wantiguira has one health center.

== Bibliography ==
- Sakama, Simon Narcisse (2023). "INSECURITE, PRATIQUES DE SECURISATION DU TERRITOIRE ET LEGITIMITE DE L'ETAT EN CENTRAFRIQUE". Surandra. 1 (A).
