= Boali Hydroelectric Power Station =

Power station in Central African Republic

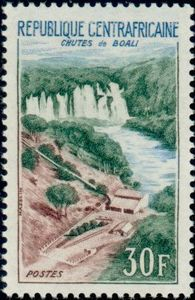

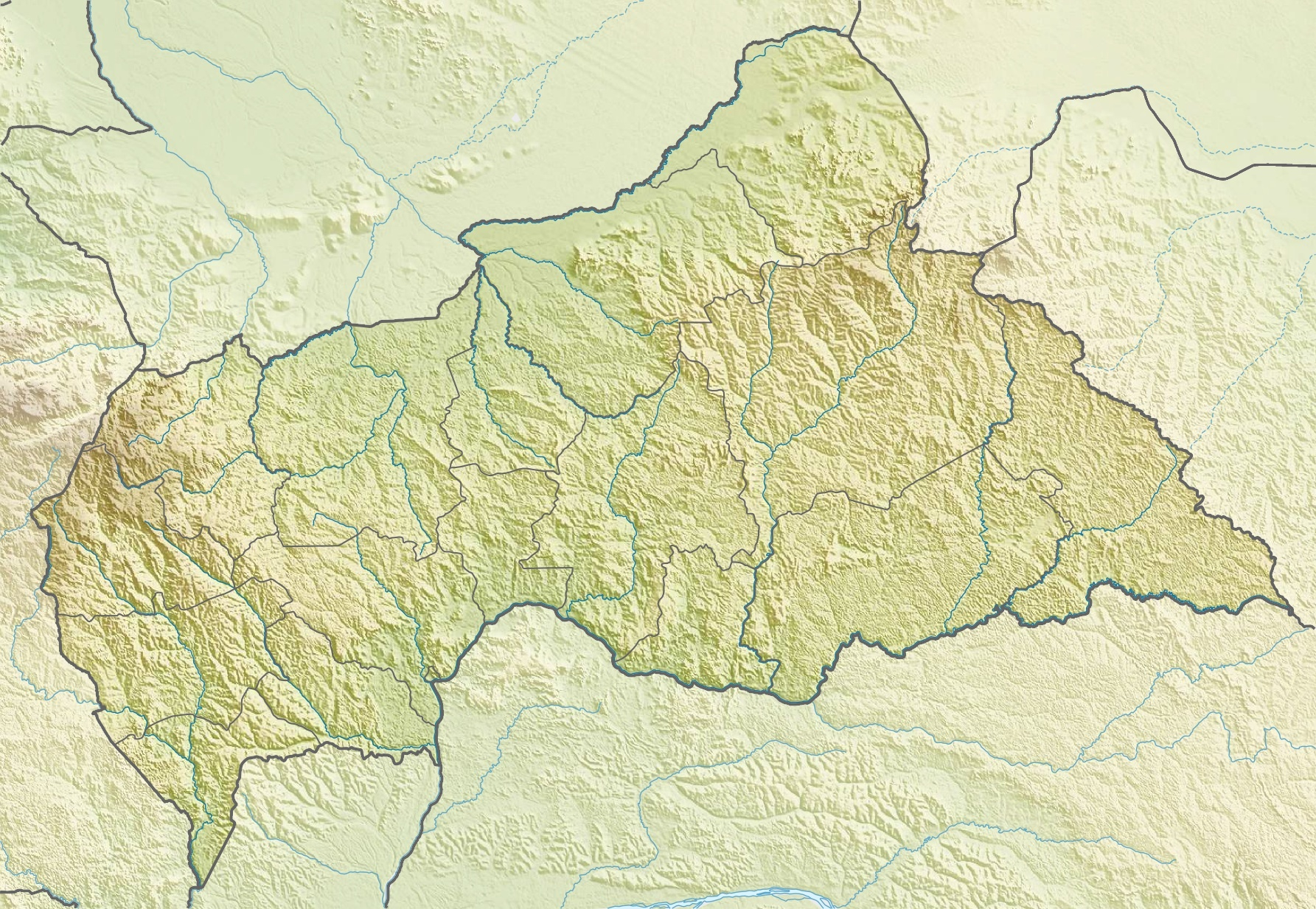
- Map of CAR showing the location of Boali HPP. Boali Hydroelectric Power Station (Africa) Boali Hydroelectric Power Station (Earth)
- Country: Central African Republic
- Location: Boali, Ombella-M'Poko
- Coordinates: 04°52′16″N 18°03′00″E
- Purpose: Power
- Status: Operational
- Owner: Government of Central African Republic
- Operator: ENERCA

Dam and spillways
- Impounds: Mbali River

Power Station
- Turbines: 1 x 8.75MW; 1 x 20MW; 1 x 10MW
- Installed capacity: 38.75 megawatts (51,960 hp)

Boali Hydroelectric Power Station is a 38.75 megawatts (51,960 hp) hydroelectric power complex near Boali in the Central African Republic.

The power complex comprises three units (a) Boali I (1 x 8.75MW) (b) Boali II (1 x 20MW) and (c) Boali III (1 x 10MW). As of December 2020, the power station was undergoing rehabilitation and renovation, to raise its capacity from 38.75 megawatts to 43.75 megawatts, by increasing the Boali III output from 10 megawatts to 15 megawatts.

== Location ==
The power station, which sits across the Mbali River, is located near the town of Boali, in Ombella-M'Poko Prefecture, approximately 100 kilometres (62 mi), northwest of the capital city of Bangui. The geographical coordinates of Boali I Hydroelectric Power Station are: 04°52'16.0"N, 18°03'00.0"E (Latitude:4.871111; Longitude:18.050000).

== Overview ==
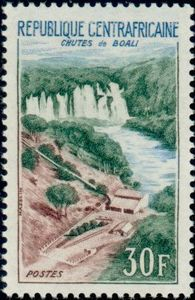
A 1963 Central African postage stamp depicting the Boali falls in the background and the hydroelectric power plant in the foreground.

Due to severe electricity shortage in the city of Bangui, the government of Central African Republic (CAR), in collaboration with the government of the Democratic Republic of the Congo (DRC), and financial backing from the African Development Bank (AfDB), developed a plan to rehabilitate the Boali Dams, improve electricity transmission around Bangui and interconnect the electricity grids of CAR and DRC, to facilitate the efficient exchange of electric power between the two neighbors.

The first phase of this project is ongoing and is expected to conclude in 2021. The work is contracted to China Gezhouaba Group Company (CGGC). This phase involves the rehabilitation of the generating equipment of Boali I, Boali II and Boali III. It also involves the update and strengthening of the transmission infrastructure between Boali and Bangui.

The second phase of this development, is expected to begin in 2021 and involves (a) establishment of high voltage transmission between CAR and two neighborhoods in DRC; Zongo and Libenge, and the electrification of all communities traversed by the new transmission lines in both countries.

== Construction costs and funding ==
The first phase is reported to cost US$50.05 million, majority borrowed from the AfDB. The second phase was originally budgeted at US$5.97 million. Funding for the second phase is sourced from the AfDB, African Development Fund, and the CAR government.

== See also ==
- List of power stations in Central African Republic
