= N8 road (Central African Republic) =

Road in Central African Republic

N8 Road

Route information
- Maintained by Central African Republic National Highways Authority

Major junctions
- North end: Sibut
- South end: Am Dafok

Location
- Country: Central African Republic

Highway system
- Transport in the Central African Republic

The N8 road also designated as RN8, is a national route in Central African Republic with a total distance of 491 kilometers. The route forms a diagonal trajectory, albeit with interruptions, connecting Sibut to the border with Sudan at Am Dafok. The N8 comprises two distinct sections: the first measuring 463 kilometers and the second measuring 107 kilometers. These sections combine to form the N8.

== Route ==
The N8 route originates in Sibut, where it diverges from the N2, marking the end of the tarmac road. From Sibut, the road proceeds northward as a wide dirt road, traversing the savannah landscape to Kaga-Bandoro. Before reaching Kaga-Bandoro, the road turns east and continues as a dirt road to Mbrès. The route then heads northeast, crossing the rolling and sparsely populated savannah to N'Délé, a significant village. At N'Délé, dirt roads branch out north and northeast, but do not connect to the remaining sections of the N8.

The third section of the N8 begins near Madjia, southwest of Birao. This segment is also a dirt road, leading northeast to Birao, a large village. From Birao, the road proceeds eastward, entering drier regions that mark the transition between the savannah and the Sahel. The road follows a small river, ultimately reaching the border with Sudan at Am Dafok. Beyond this point, a dirt road continues to Nyala in Sudan, providing a cross-border connection.

== History ==
In the 1970s, the southernmost section of the N8, along with the RR10 and N4, served as the primary route connecting Chad to the Central African Republic. An assessment in 1972 found that the N8 segment between Sibut and Kaga-Bandoro was a relatively well-maintained dirt road, facilitating most of the freight traffic from Chad to the port of Pointe-Noire in the Republic of Congo. However, the border crossing at Am Dafok is minimal, and the regional security situation is challenging, with instability in both the northeast of the Central African Republic and the adjacent Darfur region of Sudan, making travel and transportation in this area difficult.
