= N4 road (Central African Republic) =

Road in Central African Republic

N4 Road

Route information
- Maintained by Central African Republic National Highways Authority

Major junctions
- North end: Damara
- South end: Moyen-Sido

Location
- Country: Central African Republic

Highway system
- Transport in the Central African Republic

The N4 road also designated as RN4, is a national route in Central African Republic which is 432 kilometers in length. It forms a north–south axis, connecting Damara to the border with Chad at Moyen-Sido. The route provides transportation that aids trade between the Central African Republic and Chad, traversing diverse landscapes and regions in the northern part of the country.

== Route ==
The N4 route diverges from the N2 in the town of Damara, located approximately 70 kilometers northeast of Bangui. Initially, the road proceeds northwestward before turning northward, traversing the rolling savannah landscape. This region is characterized by a mix of vegetation, with taller trees primarily found near riverbeds, a distinctive feature of the country's landscape. The unpaved road passes through several larger villages but does not connect to major towns. Ultimately, the N4 reaches the border with Chad at Moyen-Sido, where it continues into Chad as a road leading to Sarh.

== History ==
The connection between the Central African Republic and Chad offers two route options: the western route via the N4 and the eastern route via the N8-RR10, passing through Kaga-Bandoro. Both routes are unpaved dirt roads, which can be challenging to navigate during and after rainfall. In the 1970s, a study was conducted to determine which route between Bangui and N'Djamena should be prioritized. The options were the western route via the N1 or the eastern route via the N4. In 1972, the Chadian government preferred the western route, while the Central African Republic government favored the eastern route. Despite minimal differences between the two options, the eastern route via Kaga-Bandoro was deemed more important due to its role in handling Chad's traffic to the port of Pointe-Noire in the Republic of Congo. However, neither plan came to fruition. Today, both the N4 and N8-RR10 remain unpaved and often impassable during the rainy season. To preserve the roads, heavy traffic is frequently restricted during and after rainfall, allowing the dirt roads to dry out and preventing damage.
