= Michel Gallin-Douathe =

Central African diplomat and politician (1920–1989)

Acting Minister of Public Service, Justice, and Labor
- In office 24 March 1980 – 1980
- President: David Dacko

Minister of Home Affairs and Public Safety
- In office 26 September 1979 – 24 March 1980
- President: David Dacko
- Succeeded by
Diplomatic offices
Ambassador of Central African Republic to France
In office May 1970 – ?
Permanent Representative of Central African Republic to the United Nations
In office January 1965 – 1970
Ambassador of Central African Republic to the United States
In office 17 August 1960 – 1962
Preceded by	Office established
Succeeded by	Jean-Pierre Sohahong-Kombet
In office 1965–1970
Preceded by	Jean-Pierre Sohahong-Kombet
Succeeded by	Roger Guérillot
Chief posts
Chief of Batangafo District
In office 28 February 1959 – 29 June 1959
Preceded by	Jacques Robert Pierre Lesueur
Succeeded by	Jean Marie Wallot
Chief of Mongoumba District
In office 28 August 1958 – 23 February 1959
Preceded by	Jean Paul Charles Magnin
Succeeded by	Henri Bourgeois

Personal details
- Born: Galingui; 4 June 1920 Limassa, Ubangi-Shari (now the present-day Central African Republic)
- Died: 7 March 1989 (aged 68) Bangui, Central African Republic
- Party: SFIO
- Education: École nationale de la France d'outre-mer

Michel Ernest Alexis Gallin-Douathe (4 June 1920 – 7 March 1989) was a Central African diplomat and politician who served in two different ministerial positions during the Second Dacko Presidency.

== Early life and education ==
Gallin-Douathe was born as Galingui on 4 June 1920 in Limassa, a village located in present-day Basse-Kotto. He enrolled at École urbaine in Bangui and École Edouard-Renard in Brazzaville for three years (1936–1939). In 1939, he went to France to study through a scholarship from French Equatorial Africa government. However, the outbreak of World War II prompted him to emigrate from France. He also studied at École nationale de la France d'outre-mer and became the first Central African who graduated from the school in 1958.

== Career ==
=== Education career ===
Galingui commenced his career as a teacher École régionale in Moundou in 1939. He then served as a school principal in Mbaiki (1940), Bangui (1941), and Bossangoa (1944). During that time, Galingui announced that he had changed his name to Gallin-Douathé and received "elevated" status on 27 July 1944, which allowed him to serve in vital administrative positions.

In 1945, Gallin-Douathé moved to Brazzaville for two-years training at École des cadres supérieurs. While living in Brazzaville, he joined French Section of the Workers' International party and was assigned as its secretary. Upon finishing the training, he was appointed as the school principal in Poto-Poto neighborhood of Brazzaville in September 1947. Gallin-Douathé went to France in 1950 to attend training at École normale de Saint-Cloud.

=== Political career ===
The Socialist Party Committee of Brazzaville appointed Gallin-Douathé to partake in the 1951 election as a candidate for Ubangi-Shari representative at the French National Assembly. During the election campaign, he received financial support from Paris and was assisted by Auguste Gandji Ko-Bokassi. Nevertheless, he did not win the election and finished in the last place with 1,208 votes.

Upon completing his studies at Colonial School, he went back to Ubangi-Shari and served as district chief in Mongoumba (28 August 1958 - 23 February 1959) and Batangafo (28 February 1959 – 29 June 1959). Afterward, Gallin-Douathé was designated as administrative affairs inspector on 10 July 1959.

After the Central African Republic earned its independence, Gallin-Douathé was assigned as the first Ambassador to the United States on 17 August 1960. He presented the credential letters to President Eisenhower on 4 November. Shortly after meeting Eisenhower, he went to a restaurant near Baltimore on a trip to New York, and the restaurant refused to serve him. This racial incident reached Eisenhower, and he wrote an apology letter to Gallin-Douathé. Nonetheless, he stipulated that he would neither publicize nor inform this racial incident to the Central African Republic government as it would give an impression that CAR-US relations started "in such an unfortunate fashion".

He was then appointed as the ambassador to the United Nations in January 1965. In May 1970, he served as the ambassador to France and the United Kingdom.

Gallin-Douathe joined the French Civil Service and worked at an overseas migration office in 1972 and then moved to the Ministry of Home Affairs in 1978. After the fall of the Bokassa regime, he went back to the Central African Republic, and Dacko appointed him as the Minister of Home Affairs and Public Safety on 26 September 1979. On 24 March 1980, he became the acting minister of Public Service, Justice, and Labor. In the same year, he was employed as a state general inspector. Under Kolingba administration, he worked as the president's advisor.

== Death ==
Gallin-Douathe retired in 1988 and died on 7 March 1989 in Bangui.

== Personal life ==
Michel Gallin-Douathe was married and from the Yakoma people.

== Bibliography ==
- Bradshaw, Richard; Rius, Juan Fandos (2016). Historical Dictionary of the Central African Republic (Historical Dictionaries of Africa). Lanham: Rowman & Littlefield.
- Serre, Jacques; Fandos-Rius, Juan (2014). Répertoire de l'administration territoriale de la République centrafricaine. Paris: L’Harmattan. ISBN 978-2-343-01298-8.
