= Gaston Banda-Bafiot =

Central African engineer, diplomat and politician

Minister of Mines and Geology
- In office April 1981 – September 1981
- President: David Dacko

Ambassador of the Central African Republic to the United States
- In office 21 August 1973 – January 1975
- Preceded by: Christophe Maïdou
- Succeeded by: David Nguindo (Chargé d'affaires ad interim)

Deputy Minister of Youth and Sports
- In office 13 September 1971 – 13 May 1972
- President: Jean-Bédel Bokassa

Minister of Energy
- In office 25 June 1970 – 13 September 1971
- President: Jean-Bédel Bokassa

Deputy Minister of Energy
- In office 4 February 1970 – 25 June 1970
- President: Jean-Bédel Bokassa

Personal details
- Born: 15 May 1934 Bossangoa, Ubangi-Shari (now the present-day Central African Republic)
- Died: 10 October 2014 (aged 80) Strasbourg, France
- Children: 7
- Education: Czech Technical University in Prague
- Occupation: Engineer; Diplomat; Politician

Gaston Banda-Bafiot (15 May 1934 – 10 October 2014) was a Central African engineer, diplomat, and politician who served as the Minister of Mines and Geology and Minister of Energy.

== Early life and education ==
Bafiot was born on 15 May 1934 in Bossangoa. He completed his primary education in Bossangoa. Afterward, he went to France to continue his secondary school. He then studied Electrotechnical Engineering at Czech Technical University in Prague. In 1963, he took a doctoral degree in electricity from the Faculty of Science in Paris and finished it in 1965.

== Career ==
Bafiot returned to the Central African Republic in 1963 and worked in the postal service as an engineer. Upon finishing his doctoral degree, he interned at a laboratory in Fontenay from 1965 to 1966.

In 1967, Bokassa appointed Bafiot as director general of ENERCA, serving it until 1970. On 4 February 1970, Bafiot was appointed Deputy Minister of Energy until 25 June 1970. He then was designated as the Minister of Energy from 25 June 1970 to 13 September 1971. Subsequently, he then served as the Deputy Minister of Youth and Sports from 13 September 1971 to 13 May 1972.

Bokassa designated Bafiot as Ambassador of the Central African Republic to the United States on 21 August 1973. He arrived in the US on 2 October 1973 and presented the credential letters to President Nixon on 9 November 1973. He held that diplomatic position until January 1975, when Bokassa appointed him as advisor engineer at the Ministry of Energy and Mines (1975–1977).

Dacko assigned Bafiot as director general of ENERCA from 1979 to 1980. He then worked as an advisor to Dacko on energy issues (1980–1981) and then as minister of mines and geology (April to September 1981). After that, he became the director of Alliance Biblique of Central African Republic from 1982 to 1988. From 1989 to 1990, he served as Chief engineer at the Central Inspection of Public Works and Territorial Planning.

== Death ==
Bafiot died on 10 October 2014 at the University Hospitals of Strasbourg and was buried at Bischheim Municipal Cemetery on 17 October 2014. Before the burial, a funeral was held at Robertsau Funeral Center.

== Personal life ==
Bafiot was married and had seven children. He could speak fluent Sango, French, and limited English.

== Awards ==
- , Commander Order of Central African Merit.
- Gold Medal of Sport Merit - 1 May 1972.
- Officer of Operation Bokassa.

== Bibliography ==
- Bradshaw, Richard; Rius, Juan Fandos (2016). Historical Dictionary of the Central African Republic (Historical Dictionaries of Africa). Lanham: Rowman & Littlefield.
