= Ddebo =

Place in Alindao, Basse-Kotto, Central African Republic

Coordinates: 04°51′00″N 021°14′00″E

Ddebo is a populated place in Alindao, Basse-Kotto, Central African Republic.
