= N5 road (Central African Republic) =

Road in Central African Republic

N5 Road

Route information
- Maintained by Central African Republic National Highways Authority

Major junctions
- North end: Bambari
- South end: Birao

Location
- Country: Central African Republic

Highway system
- Transport in the Central African Republic

The N5 road also designated as RN5, is a national route in Central African Republic which is 690 kilometers in length. It connects the towns of Bambari and Birao, located in the northeastern part of the country, providing a transportation link between the regions. The N5 helps in facilitating travel and trade in the area, along its route.

== Route ==
In the town of Bambari, the N5 diverges from the N2 and proceeds eastward, later turning northeastward, traversing the savannah landscape. The N5 is an unpaved dirt road, passing through a relatively sparse population, with few villages along the route, except for the starting point of Bambari, the endpoint of Birao, and the notable village of Ippy. The road continues eastward to Bria, then turns north, winding through sparsely populated woodland, passing through several small towns before ultimately terminating in Birao, located in the northeastern part of the country. From Birao, the N8 route continues onward.

== History ==
The N5 serves as the main route to the northeast of the Central African Republic, due to the N8 being impassable between N'Délé and Birao. Consequently, the N5 has become a vital alternative route, with traffic diverted from Bria to Birao. Notably, the N5 is an unpaved dirt road, which can pose challenges during certain weather conditions or seasons, further emphasizing its importance as a primary route in the region.
