= N3 road (Central African Republic) =

Road in Central African Republic

N3 Road

Route information
- Maintained by Central African Republic National Highways Authority

Major junctions
- North end: Bossembélé
- South end: Garoua-Mboulaï (CAM)

Location
- Country: Central African Republic

Highway system
- Transport in the Central African Republic

The N3 road also designated as RN3, is a national route in Central African Republic spanning 437 kilometers in length. It forms an east–west axis in the western region of the country, connecting Bossembélé to the border with Cameroon at Garoua-Mboulaï. The route facilitates transportation and trade between the Central African Republic and Cameroon, traversing diverse landscapes and regions in the western part of the country.

== Route ==
The N3 route originates in the village of Bossembélé, where it intersects with the N1 route from Bangui. From Bossembélé, the N3 proceeds northward before turning westward, traversing the savannah landscape. The road is paved as far as Yaloke, and possibly further west. The town of Bouar lies along the route, and the road remains paved west of Bouar. Ultimately, the N3 terminates at the border with Cameroon, where the route connects with the N1, which continues onward to Yaoundé.

== History ==
The N3 route holds great importance for the Central African Republic as a landlocked country, serving as a link to sea trade routes via Cameroon. This significance was highlighted by the World Bank in the 1970s. To enhance the route's functionality, various sections of the N3 have undergone asphalting and upgrades over the years. Between 1990 and 1992, a 66-kilometer stretch between Bossembélé and Yaloké was asphalted with Japanese support. Subsequent phases included the asphalting of 69 kilometers between Yaloké and Bossemtélé from 1995 to 1997, and 89 kilometers from Bossemtélé to Baoro from 1998 to 2001. Further significant upgrades occurred between 2010 and 2013, with the asphalting of substantial sections of the N3.

Notably, the western segment from Bouar to the Cameroon border was asphalted around 2013, featuring a modern single-lane road with marked lanes and a revised route to eliminate sharp bends. The final phase, completed in 2020, involved paving the section between Baoro and Bouar, thereby establishing a fully asphalted connection between Bangui and the Cameroonian seaport of Douala via the N3 route.
