= List of power stations in the Central African Republic =

The following page lists all power stations in Central African Republic.

== Hydroelectric ==
Hydroelectric power station	Community	Coordinates	Type	Capacity	Year completed or completion expected	River
Boali I Hydropower Station	Boali	4.8713°N 18.0499°E	Run of river	9 MW	1955	M'bali River
Boali II Hydropower Station	Boali	4.8810°N 18.0388°E	Run of river	10 MW	1976	M'bali River
Boali III Hydropower Station	Boali		Run of river	10 MW	In development	M'bali River

== Thermal ==
Thermal power station	Community	Coordinates	Fuel type	Capacity (MW)	Year completed or completion expected	Name of owner	Notes
Bangui Thermal Power Station	Bangui	4.4146°N 18.5520°E	Diesel	2 MW		ENERCA	

== Solar ==
Solar power station	Community	Coordinates	Type	Capacity (MW)	Year completed or completion expected	Name of owner	Notes
Danzi Solar Power Station	Danzi	4.5004°N 18.4755°E	Solar photovoltaic	25 MW	2023	ENERCA	
Sakaï Solar Power Station	Sakaï	4.3793°N 18.4897°E	Solar photovoltaic	15 MW	2023	ENERCA	

== See also ==
- List of power stations in Africa
- List of largest power stations in the world
