= Stanislas Moussa-Kembe =

Ambassador of the Central African Republic

Ambassador of Central African Republic to the United States
- In office 2009–2016
- President: François Bozizé; Michel Djotodia; Catherine Samba-Panza
- Preceded by: Emmanuel Touaboy
- Succeeded by: Lydie Flore Magba (Chargé d'affaires ad interim)

Personal details
- Born: 9 December 1949 Bangassou, Ubangi-Shari (now the present-day Central African Republic)
- Education: École nationale d'administration et de magistrature
- Occupation: Diplomat

Stanislas Moussa-Kembe (born 9 December 1949) is a diplomat from the Central African Republic. He served as the ambassador to the United States from 2009 to 2016, taking over for Emmanuel Touaboy.

== Early life and education ==
Moussa-Kembe was born in Bangassou on 9 December 1949. His father was a World War II veteran. He enrolled church school and later studied public administration at École nationale d'administration et de magistrature, graduating in 1976.

== Career ==
He joined the Central African Republic foreign service in 1976. He has been posted to Yugoslavia, France, and Zaire. While working at the Central African Republic Embassy in Belgrade and Paris, he served as first secretary. Furthermore, he also became inspector of diplomatic missions and the chief of protocol. In 2004, serving as chief of protocol, Moussa-Kembe assisted the former Haitien president, Jean-Bertrand Aristide, to Jamaica.

Bozize appointed Moussa-Kembe as an Ambassador to the United States in 2009. He presented his credential letter to Barack Obama on 4 November 2009. He also organized the 2009 CEMAC summit. Moreover, he was also employed as a non-resident ambassador to Canada.

Moussa-Kembe ran for the president candidacy on 2015–16 Central African general election and gained 1,906 votes. He currently works as Chief of Staff of Presidency.

== Personal life ==
Moussa-Kembe married Gisèle Franck Moussa Kembe, and she died in September 2009. He has 10 children.
