= Henri Koba =

Central African diplomat and journalist

Ambassador of Central African Republic to the United States
- In office 19 September 1994 – February 2001
- President: Ange-Félix Patassé
- Preceded by: Jean-Pierre Sohahong-Kombet
- Succeeded by: Emmanuel Touaboy

Personal details
- Born: 30 August 1936 Mbaiki, Ubangi-Shari (now the present-day Central African Republic)
- Died: 19 February 2005 (aged 68) Washington, D.C., US
- Spouse: Juliette Koba
- Occupation: Journalist; Diplomat

Henri Koba (30 August 1936 – 19 February 2005) was a Central African diplomat and journalist.

== Biography ==
=== Early life and career ===
Born in Mbaiki on 30 August 1936, Koba belonged to Ngbati. He joined Radio Centrafrique and was assigned to the information department. He was then appointed as the director of the Radio Centrafrique until 26 July 1968. In February 1971, Bokassa named Koba as the head of the Hospital Center in Bangui. Koba reportedly served as the publication director of Bangui-Match magazine in 1974 and attended the boxing match between George Foreman vs. Muhammad Ali in Kinshasa. In 1977, Koba was part of the Central African Empire imperial court's special representative on specific missions.

During Patasse's presidency, Koba served as the ambassador of the Central African Republic to the United States from 19 September 1994 to February 2001. Apart from serving as the Ambassador to the United States, he also worked as the Central African Republic Permanent Representative of the Central African Republic to the United Nations and sent the credentials on 22 September 1994. As CAR's permanent representative to the UN, he called for the extension of Interim Monitoring Mission for the Bangui Agreements during the 1997 UN General Assembly.

=== Death and personal life ===
Koba died on 19 February 2005 in Washington, D.C.. He was married to Juliette Koba. His son, Jean Baptiste Koba, is a Central African politician and was elected as the president of MESAN party in 2011.

== Awards ==
- , Knight Order of Central African Merit – 1 December 1967.
