= Christophe Maïdou =

Central African diplomat

Ambassador of Central African Republic to France
- In office 10 August 1985 – 1990
- President: Andre Kolingba
- In office 2 June 1973 – 25 June 1974
- President: Jean-Bédel Bokassa
- Succeeded by: Clément Sevot

Ambassador of Central African Republic to the United States
- In office 19 December 1975 – 1980
- President: Jean-Bédel Bokassa; David Dacko
- Preceded by: David Nguindo (Chargé d'affaires ad interim)
- Succeeded by: Jacques Topande-Makombo
- In office 6 August 1971 – 1973
- President: Jean-Bédel Bokassa
- Preceded by: Roger Guérillot
- Succeeded by: Gaston Banda-Bafiot

Ambassador of the Central African Republic to Japan and the Republic of China
- In office 1970–1971
- President: Jean-Bédel Bokassa

Ambassador of the Central African Republic to Yugoslavia
- In office ?–?

Ambassador of the Central African Republic to the Democratic Republic of the Congo
- In office 1967–?
- President: Jean-Bédel Bokassa

Personal details
- Born: 14 February 1936 Bangui, Ubangi-Shari (now the present-day Central African Republic)
- Relations: Henri Maïdou (brother)
- Parent: Maurice Maïdou (father)
- Occupation: Diplomat

Christophe Maïdou (born 14 February 1936) is a Central African diplomat who served in various ambassadorial positions.

== Biography ==
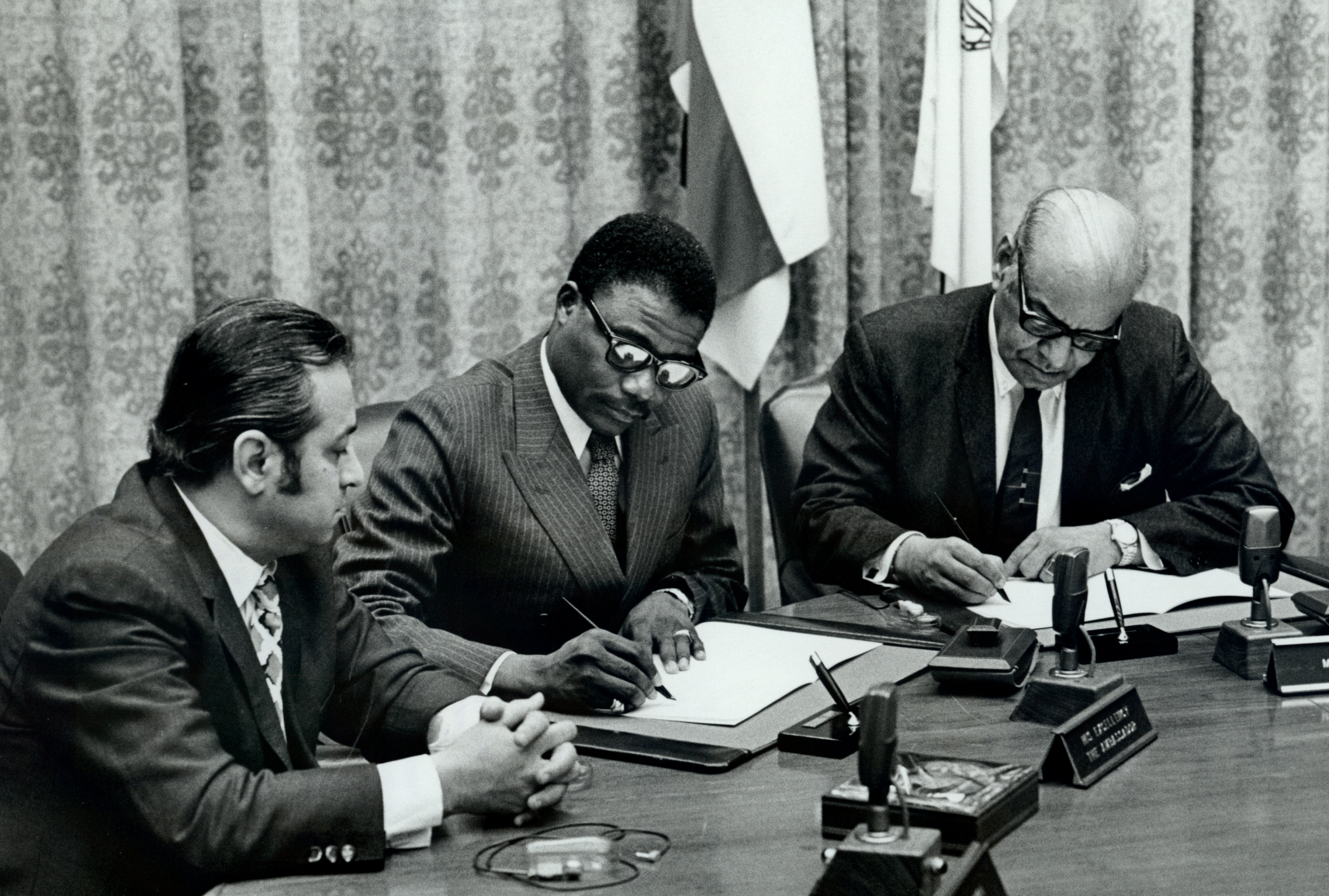
Christophe Maidou (center) and Mohamed Shoaib (right) signed an education project on 26 May 1972

Born in Bangui on 14 February 1936, Christophe is a twin brother of Henri Maïdou. His father, Maurice Maidou, was a physician. On 12 February 1962, he was posted at the Embassy of the Central African Republic in Paris as deputy head of mission, a position that he held until 18 September 1964. Afterward, Bokassa appointed Maïdou as the Ambassador to the Democratic Republic of the Congo in 1967.

In an unknown year, Maïdou served as the Ambassador to Yugoslavia. Furthermore, he also became the head of the Central African Republic delegate at the 1969 Non-Aligned Countries Summit in Belgrade. Subsequently, he was designated as the Ambassador to Japan and the Republic of China on 15 May 1970 and served in that position until 1971. On 6 August 1971, Bokassa named Maïdou as the Ambassador to the United States and sent a letter of credence to Richard Nixon on 13 October. When serving as the Ambassador to the United States, he became the country's signatory to the Agreement Governing the Activities of States on the Moon and Other Celestial Bodies on 27 April 1972 and Convention on the Prohibition of the Development, Production and Stockpiling of Bacteriological (Biological) and Toxin Weapons and on their Destruction.

Bokassa appointed Maïdou as Ambassador to France on 2 June 1973 and handed over the credential letter to Alain Poher on 19 June. He left the position as Ambassador to France on 25 June 1974 and the position was replaced by Clement Sevot. He later became the secretary-general of the Ministry of Foreign Affairs. He was then reappointed as the Ambassador to the United States on 19 December 1975. He presented a credential letter to Gerald Ford on 9 February 1976 and served until 1980. Under Kolingba's administration, he worked as the Ambassador to France for five years (10 August 1985 to 1990).

Maïdou is married.

== Award ==
- , Commander Order of Central African Merit, 23 January 1967.

== Bibliography ==
- Bradshaw, Richard; Rius, Juan Fandos (2016). Historical Dictionary of the Central African Republic (Historical Dictionaries of Africa). Lanham: Rowman & Littlefield.
