= Christian Lingama-Toleque =

Central African diplomat and politician

Minister of Foreign Affairs
- In office 4 November 1991 – 8 December 1992
- President: Andre Kolingba
- Preceded by: Laurent Gomina-Pampali
- Succeeded by: Jean-Marie Bassia

Ambassador of the Central African Republic to the United States
- In office 24 September 1982 – 18 December 1989
- Preceded by: Jacques Topande-Makombo
- Succeeded by: Jean-Pierre Sohahong-Kombet

Minister of Information
- In office 27 October 1975 – ?
- President: Jean-Bédel Bokassa
- Preceded by: Clement Michel Pascal Nga Gnii-Voueto
- Succeeded by: Louis Pierre Gamba

Personal details
- Born: 18 September 1936 (age 88); Bangui, Ubangi-Shari (now the present-day Central African Republic)
- Occupation: Diplomat; Politician

Christian Lingama-Toleque (born 18 September 1936) is a Central African diplomat and politician.

== Early career ==
Born in Bangui on 18 September 1936, Lingama-Toleque entered the Central African Republic education service as a teacher. On 8 January 1964, he was transferred to administrative service.

== Bokassa government ==
On 11 January 1966, Bokassa appointed Lingama-Toleque as director of information and press and held that position until 23 January 1967. Subsequently, he served as the director of information for the office of the president on 20 November 1972. He was then designated as the minister of information on 27 October 1975. Lingama-Toleque joined the Council of the Central African Revolution on 4 September 1976 and was responsible for presidential press and journalist training. Afterward, he became the press adviser to the imperial court from 17 December 1976 to 17 January 1977.

== Kolingba government ==
Kolingba assigned Lingama-Toleque as the Ambassador to the United States in 1982. He presented the credential letters to President Reagan on 24 September 1982. He held that position until 18 December 1989. From 4 November 1991 to 8 December 1992, he served as the Minister of Foreign Affairs. During his tenure, he signed an accord for the establishment of a European delegation with Manuel Marin in Bangui on 19 November 1992 and an agreement to establish a joint council with Fredrick Chien during 6-days Kolingba's visit to Taiwan.

== Bibliography ==
- Bradshaw, Richard; Rius, Juan Fandos (2016). Historical Dictionary of the Central African Republic (Historical Dictionaries of Africa). Lanham: Rowman & Littlefield.
