= Kongbo =

- Location in Central African Republic
- Coordinates: 4°46′8″N 21°22′2″E
- Country: Central African Republic
- Prefecture: Basse-Kotto
- Sub-prefecture: Alindao
- Commune: Bakou

Kongbo is a village situated in Basse-Kotto Prefecture, Central African Republic.

== History ==
A clash between armed groups occurred in Kongbo on 24 and 25 August 2017, causing the residents to flee to the MINUSCA base in the village. Two days later, some returned to their homes. Anti-balaka attacked Kongbo on 2 September 2017 and MINUSCA forces repelled it. In June 2018, there was a clash between ex-Séléka and Anti-balaka in Kongbo.

== Economy ==
The village has a market.

== Education ==
There are two schools in Kongbo.

== Healthcare ==
Kongbo has one health center.

== Bibliography ==
- ACTED (August 2019). RCA RRM : Evaluation Multisectorielle à Kongbo et sur l'axe Kongbo-Dimbi (Préfecture de la Basse-Kotto), (ACTED/27.08.2019) (PDF) (Report).
