= List of ambassadors of the Central African Republic to the United States =

Coordinates: 38.924461°N 77.040612°W

Ambassador of Central African Republic to United States Embassy of the Central African Republic in Washington, D.C.
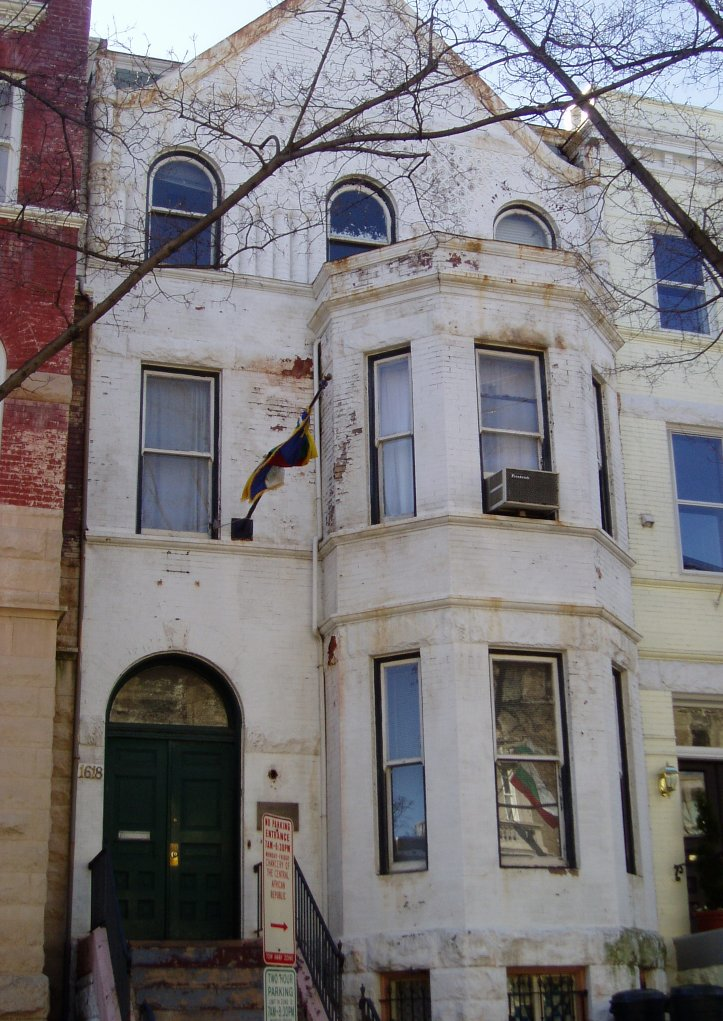
- Incumbent; Martial Ndoubou since September 17, 2018
- Inaugural holder: Michel Gallin-Douathe
- Formation: November 3, 1960

The Central African ambassador in Washington, D. C. is the official representative of the Government in Bangui to the Government of the United States.

== List of representatives ==
Diplomatic agrément	Diplomatic accreditation	ambassador	Observations	List of prime ministers of Cameroon	List of presidents of the United States	Term end List of heads of state of the Central African Republic
November 3, 1960			EMBASSY OPENED	David Dacko	Dwight D. Eisenhower	
October 18, 1960	November 3, 1960	Michel Gallin-Douathe	GALLIN-DOUATHE, MICHEL. Born, Limassa, Central African Republic, 4 June 1920. Education, l'Ecole Na- tionale de France d 'outre- Me r (Paris). Was counselor for administrative affairs in charge of French technical assistance in the Central African Republic and also was adviser to the government of French Equatorial Africa in Brazzaville. Also appointed Ambassador to the United States in addition. 15 November 1960 Permanent Representative to the UN. On November 4, Central African Republic Representative Michel Gallin-Douathe was refused service at a diner near Baltimore, Maryland, while returning to New York City from Washington, where he had just presented his credentials. 1963: Ambassador Michel Gallin-Douathe, Central African Republic's permanent delegate to the United Nations, declared here that the government of the Republic of China is the only lawful government that can represent the Chinese people.	David Dacko	Dwight D. Eisenhower	
March 30, 1962		Jean-Pierre Kombet	(* March 26, 1935 in Upper Sengha, Central African Republic): Former mayor City of Berberati, superintendent of schools.; Numerous diplomatic positions in Sudan, Italy, Food and Agriculture Organization, Switzerland, Greence, China, Korea, Pakistan.; minister of foreign affairs.; 1989: Permanent representative United Nations, New York City.	David Dacko	John F. Kennedy	
January 12, 1965	January 14, 1965	Michel Gallin-Douathe		David Dacko	Lyndon B. Johnson	
September 2, 1970	September 21, 1970	Roger Guérillot		Jean-Bédel Bokassa	Richard Nixon	
September 23, 1971	October 13, 1971	Christophe Maïdou	1985-1991: secrétaire-général du ministère centrafricain des Affaires étrangères	Jean-Bédel Bokassa	Richard Nixon	
October 5, 1973	November 9, 1973	Gaston Banda-Bafiot	1991: Minister of Energy	Jean-Bédel Bokassa	Richard Nixon	
January 3, 1975		David Nguindo	Chargé d'affaires	Jean-Bédel Bokassa	Gerald Ford	
January 28, 1976	February 9, 1976	Christophe Maïdou		Jean-Bédel Bokassa	Gerald Ford	
June 5, 1980	June 6, 1980	Jacques Topande-Makombo		David Dacko	Jimmy Carter	
September 10, 1982	September 24, 1989	Christian Lingama-Toleque	1992: Central African Republic Foreign Minister	André Kolingba	Ronald Reagan	
October 20, 1989	December 18, 1989	Jean-Pierre Sohahong-Kombet	1983: ambassador to China	André Kolingba	George H. W. Bush	
September 29, 1994	November 21, 1994	Henri Koba		Ange-Félix Patassé	Bill Clinton	
January 1, 2001	February 14, 2001	Emmanuel Touaboy		Ange-Félix Patassé	George W. Bush	
August 24, 2009	November 4, 2009	Stanislas Moussa-Kembe		François Bozizé	Barack Obama	
