= Emmanuel Touaboy =

Central African diplomat (born 1951)

Ambassador of Central African Republic to China
- In office 2009–2013
- President: François Bozizé
- Preceded by: ?
- Succeeded by: Jean Pierre Mbazoa

Ambassador of Central African Republic to the United States
- In office 2001–2009
- President: Ange-Félix Patassé; François Bozizé
- Preceded by: Henri Koba
- Succeeded by: Stanislas Moussa-Kembe

Personal details
- Born: 4 August 1951 Bangui, Ubangi-Shari (now the present-day Central African Republic)
- Education: University of Bangui; University of Yaounde
- Occupation: Diplomat

Emmanuel Touaboy (born 4 August 1951) is a Central African diplomat from Bossangoa, Central African Republic.

== Early life and education ==
Touaboy was born on 4 August 1951 in Bangui to a father who worked as a doctor in the French Army, Jean Marie Touaboy. He was raised in the Kassai neighborhood in Bangui and attended Brethren Church services. In 1959, he went to Cameroon for school. Touaboy enrolled at the University of Bangui. He then studied geography and urban planning in Abidjan and earned a PhD degree in International relations from University of Yaounde.

== Career ==
Toaboy began his career by teaching in Abidjan and Bangui. In 1986, he joined the Ministry of Foreign Affairs. Under Patassé presidency, he served as an Ambassador to Ivory Coast.

Touaboy was appointed to the position of Ambassador to the United States in February 2001 by President Ange-Félix Patassé. When Patassé was overthrown by rebel leader François Bozizé, Touaboy maintained his post in the United States. While serving as ambassador, he became the administrative council member of Grace College and Grace Theological Seminary in Winona Lake due to his Brethen Church membership. He was succeeded by Stanislas Moussa-Kembe in 2009.

In 2009, Bozize designated Touaboy as an Ambassador to China, and he served there until 2013.

== Bibliography ==
- Bradshaw, Richard; Rius, Juan Fandos (2016). Historical Dictionary of the Central African Republic (Historical Dictionaries of Africa). Lanham: Rowman & Littlefield.
