= Jean-Pierre Sohahong-Kombet =

Central African diplomat and politician

Minister of Foreign Affairs
- In office 3 April 1981 – 1 September 1981
- President: David Dacko
- Prime Minister: Simon Narcisse Bozanga
- Preceded by: Simon Bédaya-Ngaro
- Succeeded by: Jean-Louis Gervil-Yambala
Diplomatic posts
Ambassador of Central African Republic to the United States
In office 1989–1994
Preceded by	Christian Lingama-Toleque
Succeeded by	Henri Koba
In office 1962–1965
Preceded by	Michel Gallin-Douathe
Succeeded by	Michel Gallin-Douathe
Ambassador of Central African Republic to China
In office 1983–?
Ambassador of Central African Republic to Italy
In office 1970–1971
Ambassador of Central African Republic to Sudan
In office 1967–1970
Ambassador of Central African Republic to Israel
Succeeded by

Personal details
- Born: 26 March 1935 Berbérati, Ubangi-Shari (now the present-day Central African Republic)
- Died: 25 January 2017 (aged 81) Sandy Springs, Georgia, U.S
- Occupation: Diplomat

Jean-Pierre Sohahong-Kombet (26 March 1935 – 25 January 2017) was a Central African diplomat and politician who served in different diplomatic posts at the Central African Republic embassies and as minister of foreign affairs in 1981.

== Early life and career ==
Kombet was born on 26 March 1935 in Berbérati to the couple of Gamambelo and Nando. He studied at a teacher's college in Bambari and graduated on 13 June 1956. Subsequently, he joined the French Equatorial Africa education service. After the education service was handed over to the Central African government, he became the school inspector. Kombet also served as the Mayor of Berbérati in the 1960s.

== Diplomatic service ==
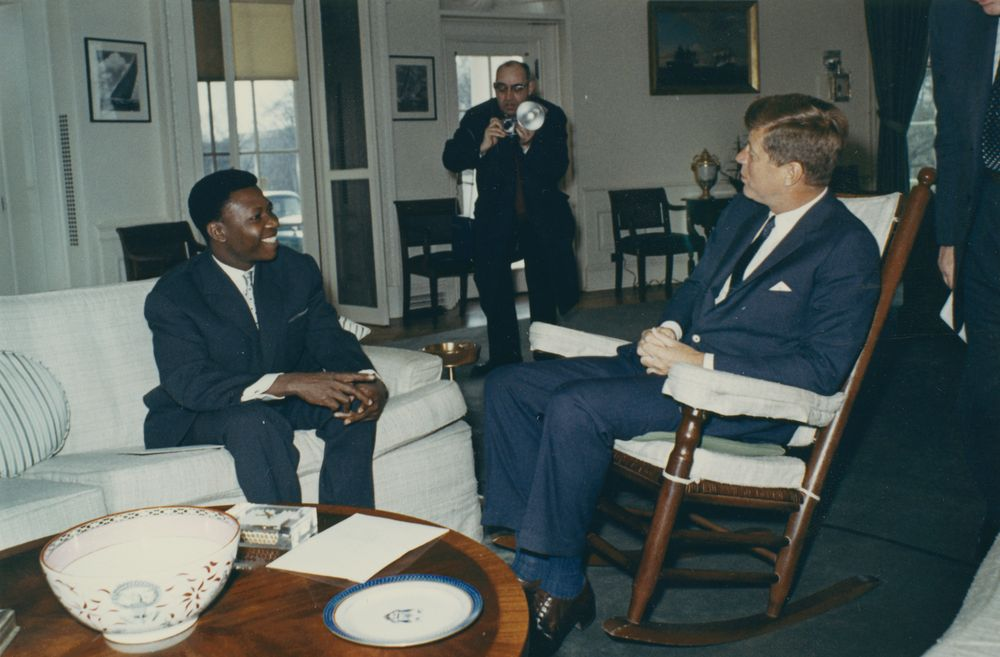
Jean-Pierre Sohahong-Kombet met John F. Kennedy in 1962

Dacko designated Kombet as the first secretary of the Embassy of the Central African Republic in Washington DC in 1960. In 1962, he was appointed the Ambassador of Central African Republic to the United States at 27. Afterward, he served as the Ambassador to Israel and Secretary-general at the Ministry of Foreign Affairs in 1965.

Bokassa selected Kombet as the first CAR Ambassador to Sudan on 3 March 1967. He served it until 1970 and then worked as the Ambassador to Italy. On 13 July 1971, Kombet was dismissed as the ambassador and detained. He was incarcerated at Ngaragba Central Prison until 22 September 1979. During his imprisonment, he was tortured. Under the second presidency of David Dacko, Kombet served as Deputy Minister of Foreign Affairs (1980 to 1981) and Minister of Foreign Affairs (3 April to 1 September 1981).

In 1983,Kolingba appointed Kombet as the Ambassador to China in 1983. During his tenure as the ambassador to China, he negotiated with China to build the 20,000-seat stadium in Bangui. In 1989, he was reappointed as the Ambassador to the United States, the United Nations, and Canada and handed the credential letters to George H. W. Bush on 18 December. He served in this position until 1994.

== Personal life ==
Kombet married Catherine Brigitte Sohahong-Kombet. Kombet died on 25 January 2017 in Sandy Springs due to cancer.

== Bibliography ==
- Bradshaw, Richard; Rius, Juan Fandos (2016). Historical Dictionary of the Central African Republic (Historical Dictionaries of Africa). Lanham: Rowman & Littlefield.
