= Yaloke-Bossembele =

Coordinates: 5°16′48″N 17°18′00″E

- Sub-prefecture
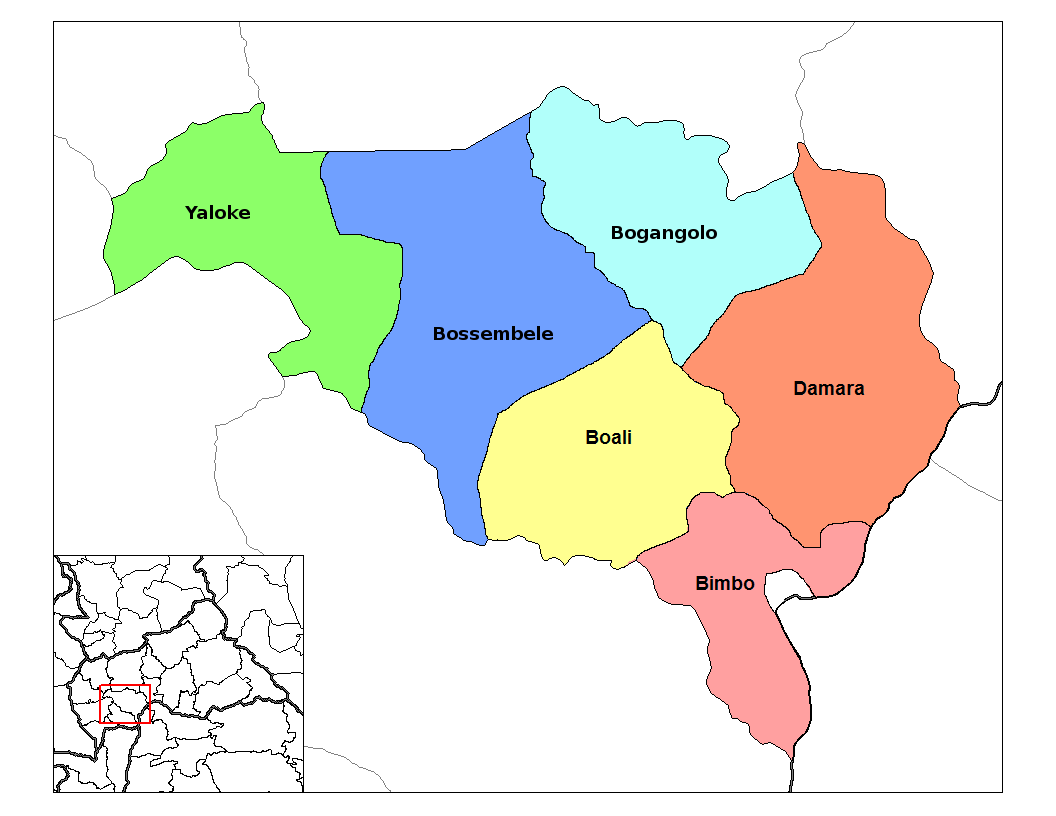
- Sub-prefectures of Ombella-M'Poko
- Country: Central African Republic
- Prefecture: Ombella-M'Poko
- Time zone: UTC+1 (WAT)

Yaloke-Bossembele is a sub-prefecture of the Ombella-M'Poko Prefecture of the western Central African Republic. It combines the main towns of Bossembele and Yaloke and the surrounding villages.
