= Yaloke =

- Town
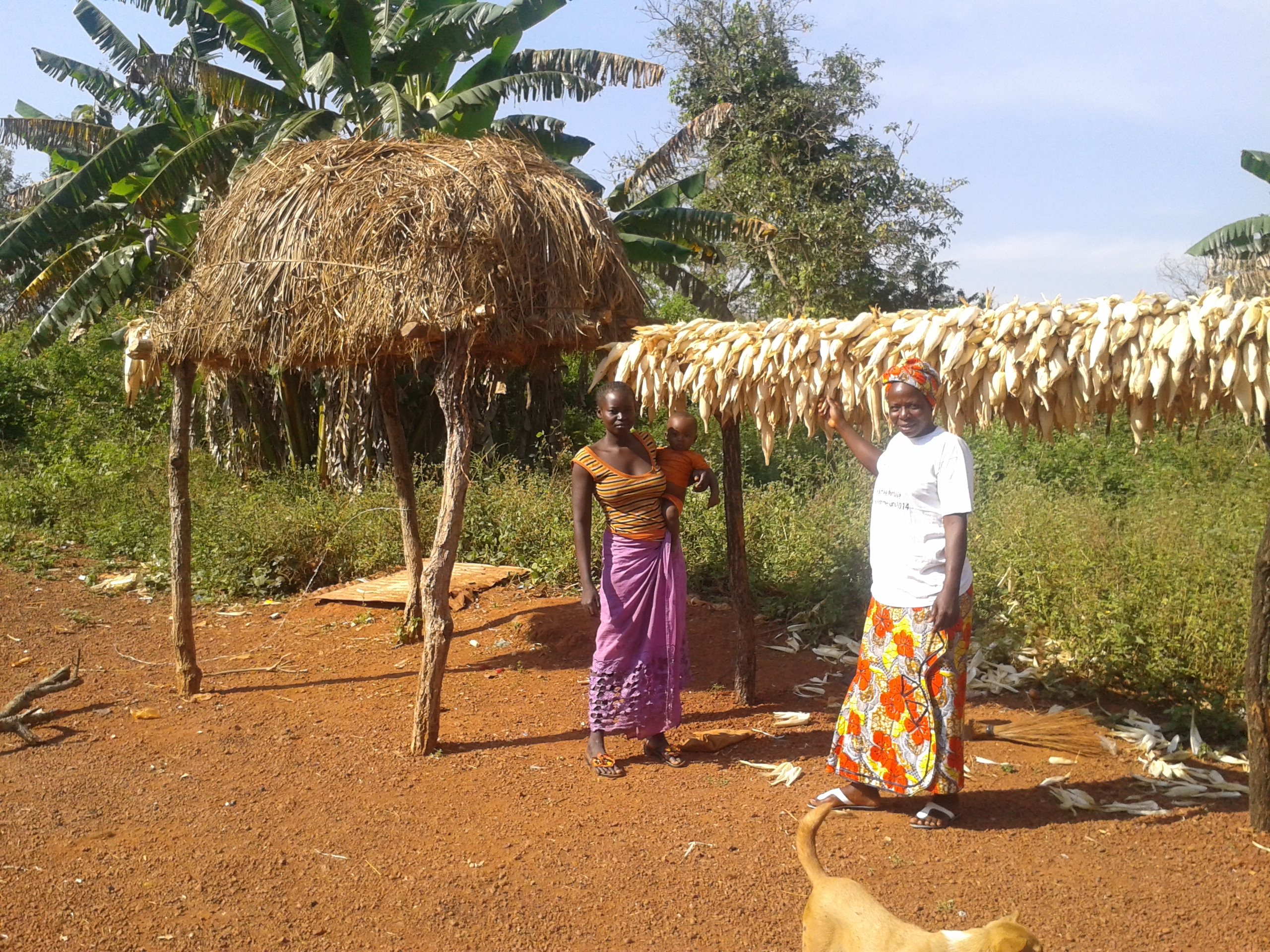
- Harvest in Yaloke, 2014

- Location in the Central African Republic
- Coordinates: 5°19′N 17°5′E
- Country: Central African Republic
- Prefecture: Ombella-M'Poko
- Sub-prefecture: Yaloke-Bossembele

Government
  - Sub-Prefect: Abel Beltoungou
- Time zone: UTC+1 (WAT)

Yaloke is a town in the Yaloke-Bossembele sub-prefecture in the Ombella-M'Poko prefecture of the western Central African Republic.

== History ==
In December 2014, UNHCR was seeking relocation for "474 Muslims from the Peuhl ethnic minority" trapped in the town of Yaloke. The refugees were reported to be in poor physical condition, and "subject to recurrent threats, verbal and physical aggression, and looting by anti-balaka militias." In July 2017 it was reported that the town was under control of security forces. On 18 December 2020 Yaloke was captured by rebels from Coalition of Patriots for Change. It was recaptured by government forces on 6 February 2021.
