= Bogangolo =

Coordinates: 5°34′N 18°15′E

- sub-prefectures
- Location in Central African Republic
- Country: Central African Republic

Government
  - Sub-Prefect: Honoré Dote

Bogangolo is a sub-prefecture of Ombella-M'Poko in the Central African Republic.

== Administration ==
The commune of Bogangolo is the only commune of the sub-prefecture. In 2003, its population was 7,358, entirely in rural areas.
