= Enerca =

Central African energy company

Energie Centrafricaine
- Type: Public utility
- Industry: Energy
- Founded: 1963
- Headquarters: Rue de l'Industrie, Bangui, Central African Republic
- Area served: Greater Bangui Area
- Products: Electricity
- Services: Electricity Generation, Electricity transmission, Electricity Distribution
- Owner: CAR Government (100%)

Enerca (Energie Centrafricaine) is the principal energy utility company of the Central African Republic. The company was founded in 1963 and is the primary company in the country operating in the generation, transmission and distribution of electricity. The company is owned by the government under the mandate of the Ministry of Development of Energy and Water Resources.

Enerca operates two hydropower plants at Boali and a diesel power station in Bangui. The main center of electricity consumption is the capital city of Bangui. High voltage transmission lines link Boali's Mbali River hydroelectric area to the capital. Outside the capital, diesel generators are used to provide power. The company has been looking for foreign investment from the World Bank and various European development agencies to upgrade its aging infrastructure.

== History ==
Enerca was formed in 1967 as a government-owned utility company, and was privatized in 2004. Enerca is involved in all large-scale electricity production in the country. Until 2023, Enerca's power production relied on a mix of hydropower and diesel; in 2023, four solar farms came online in the country. At that point, Enerca was producing 96 megawatts of the estimated 250 megawatts that the country needs.

== Operations ==
The total installed capacity of the company is around 28 MW of which only 18 MW is operational. Due to poor management, high operational costs, very high distribution losses and poor bill collection, ENERCA has struggled to raise capital to maintain its infrastructure. Bill collection rate stands at 60% and cost recovery of production is at 55%.

The company has a market penetration of only 18% in Bangui and 4% nationwide. As of 2016, the company has about 30,000 active customers. The poor quality of services has forced consumers to either use personal diesel generators or solar systems for their electricity needs.

== See also ==
- List of power stations in the Central African Republic
