= Mingala =

- Sub-prefecture and town
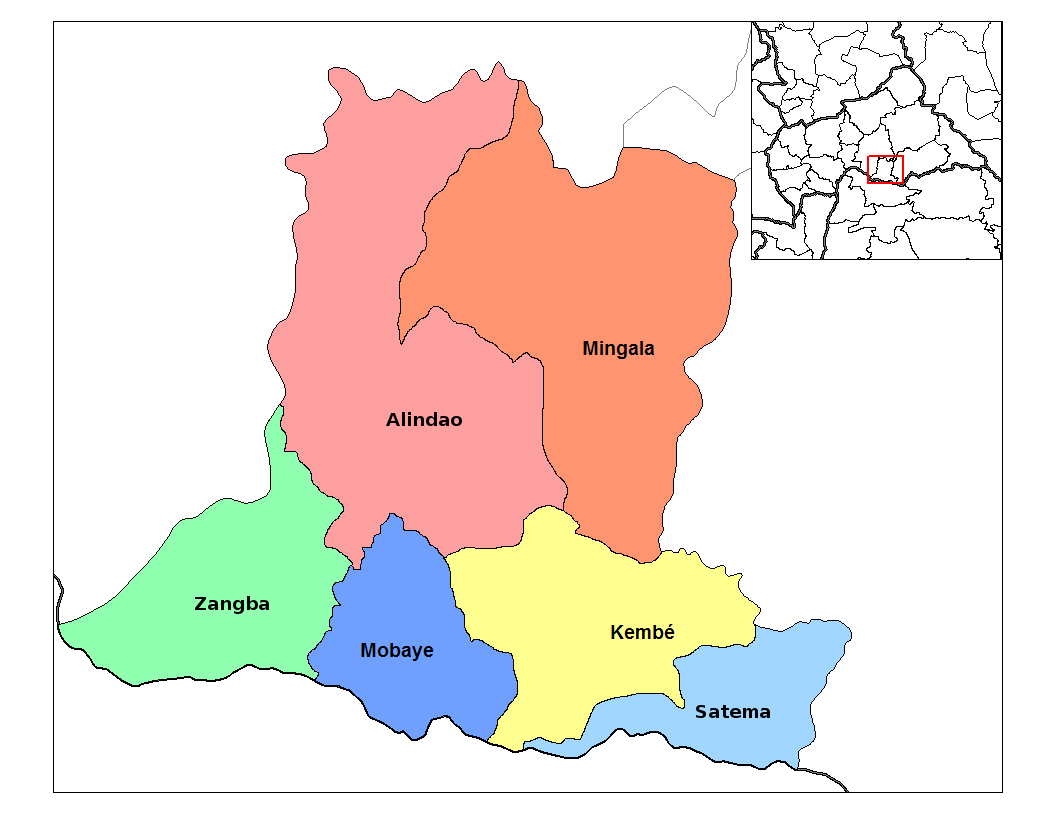
- Sub-prefectures of Basse-Kotto

- Location in the Central African Republic
- Coordinates: 4°50′N 21°46′E
- Country: Central African Republic
- Prefecture: Basse-Kotto

Government
  - Sub-Prefect: Bernard Balabanga
  - Mayor: Martial Kabassi
- Time zone: UTC+1 (WAT)

Mingala is a sub-prefecture and town in the Basse-Kotto Prefecture of the southern Central African Republic.

== History ==
On 19 May 2019 rebels from Union for Peace in the Central African Republic seized gold mine near Mingala town. On 10 January 2020 UPC rebels took control of several villages (Kollo, Kaboul 3, Zounguinza i Drochengba and Morouba) near Mingala. On 18 September 2021 heavy clashes erupted in Mingala between UPC rebels and Russian mercenaries. As of January 2022 Mingala remains under UPC control.
