= Honorine Flore Lydie Magba =

Honorine Flore Lydie Magba is a Central African Republic diplomat. She is deputy chief of mission to the United States. She was Ambassador to Ivory Coast.
