= Mobaye =

- Location in Central African Republic
- Coordinates: 4°19′31.6″N 21°10′40.1″E
- Country: Central African Republic
- Prefecture: Basse-Kotto

Government
  - Sub-Prefect: Saturnin Ngouka

Population (2003)
  - Total: 7,176

Mobaye is a settlement with a population of 7,176 (2003 census) in the Basse-Kotto prefecture of Central African Republic. It lies on the Ubangi River.

== History ==
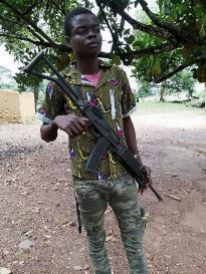
Anti-balaka fighter in Mobaye, 2019

On 8 February 2013 Mobaye was captured by Séléka rebels. In September 2019 Mobaye was reportedly under joint control of Anti-balaka and Union for Peace in the Central African Republic. On 4 May 2021 Mobaye was recaptured by government forces.
