= Alindao =

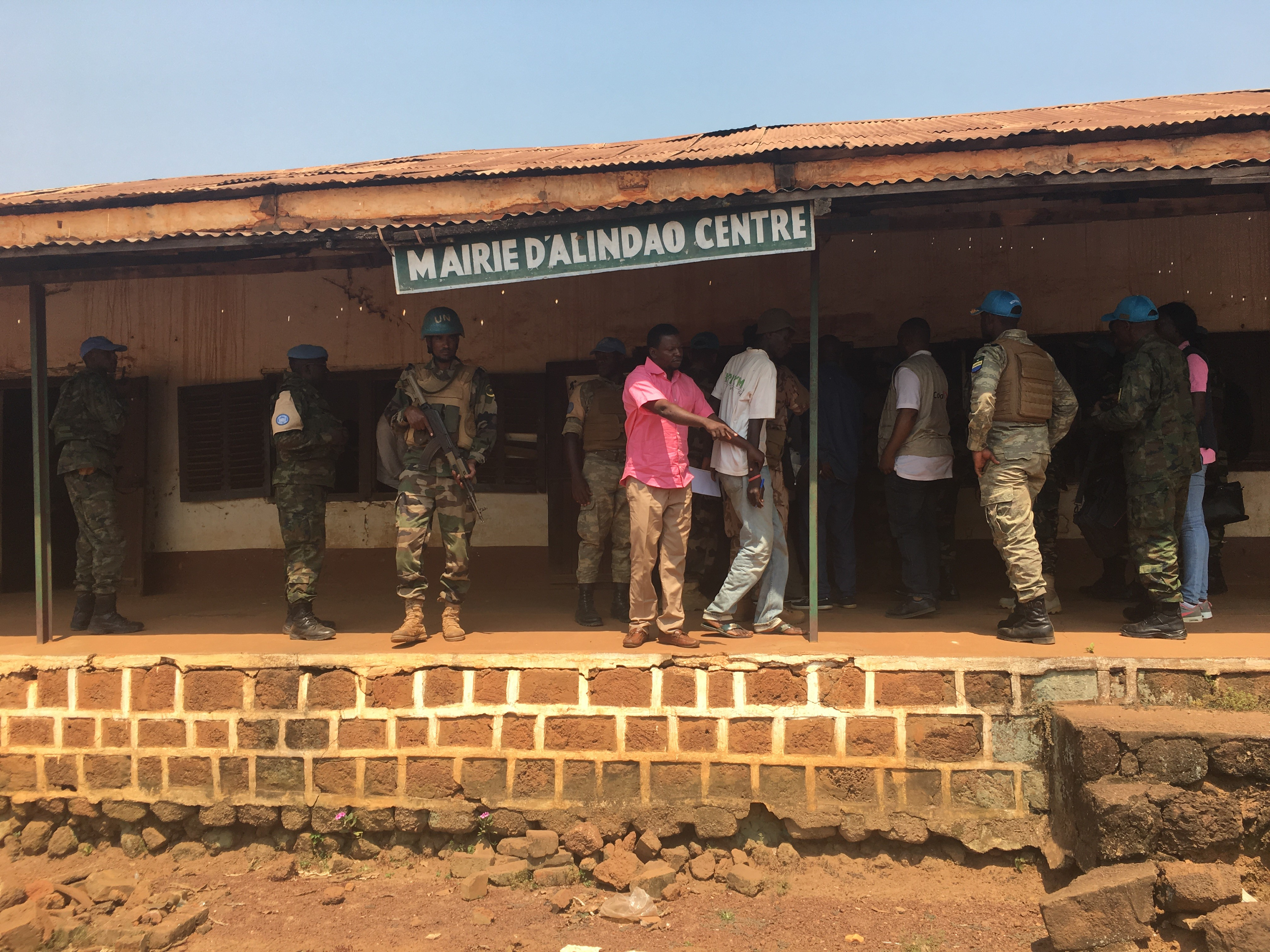
- Alindao in 2018

- Location in Central African Republic
- Coordinates: 5°2′0″N 21°13′0″E
- Country: Central African Republic
- Prefecture: Basse-Kotto

Government
  - Sub-Prefect: Jean Gilbert Gbangoudou
  - Mayor: Guy Maurice Mbonzomon-Sesse

Population (2003)
  - Total: 14,401

Alindao is a town and sub-prefecture located in the Central African Republic prefecture of Basse-Kotto. It lies at the junction of the National Route 2 and 22. Alindao had a population of 14,401 as of the 2003 census; and a calculated 2013 population of 15,213. The town is the seat of the Roman Catholic Diocese of Alindao. It has a small airport, Alindao Airport. A Catholic Mission was established at Alindao during French occupation under French Equatorial Africa.

== History ==
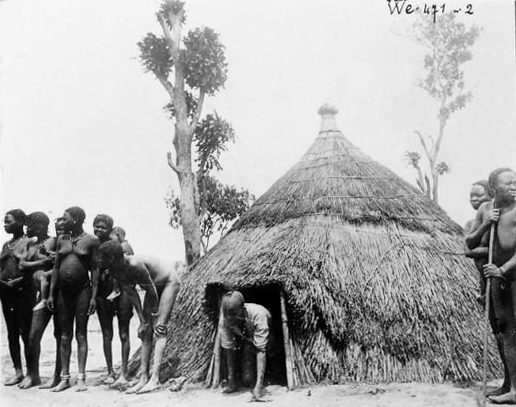
A hut in Alindao in 1924.

In 1912, the leader of the Banda-Ngbugu people in Alindao, Aju, swore allegiance to the French colonisers. However, he led a local revolt in 1925 and was captured and executed the following year.

In 1927, Norwegian missionary Oscar Cesar Berntz-Lanz established the Elim Mission at Boybinga in the Alindao subprefecture. It was among the first Protestant missions in the colony and included a small dispensary and a school. When World War II broke out in 1939, the family relocated to South Africa.

On 5 January 2013 Séléka rebels took control of Alindao. On 9 May 2017 it was attacked by Anti-balaka which was repelled by Union for Peace in the Central African Republic. On 15 November 2018 at least 112 people were killed and 27 injured in UPC and Anti-balaka attacks on Alindao refugee camp. On 18 March 2021 Alindao was recaptured by government forces supported by Russian paramilitary forces.

== Economy ==
The economy is based on food crops and cash crops (mainly coffee), and the processing of agricultural products. Fishing, hunting, trade and craft activities are also local employment practices but the majority live in poverty. The locals reside in houses with huge thatched roofs and mud walls painted in colored clay.

== Towns and villages ==
- Abouma
- Akpia
- Alepa
- Alindao
- Amoko
- Bada [5°'0"N 21°8'0"E]
- Bada [4°50'0"N 21°20'0"E]
- Bada [4°47'0"N 21°12'0"E]
- Badji
- Balada
- Banan
- Banda [5°20'0"N 21°'0"E]
- Banda [5°'0"N 21°9'0"E]
- Banda [4°52'0"N 21°20'0"E]
- Banda [4°'0"N 21°'0"E]
- Bangba
- Belogba
- Bitou
- Bokoula
- Bondo
- Borota
- Boroudou
- Boulouvou
- Bourou
- Boybangoro
- Boykette
- Congo
- Dabizi
- Dahou
- Ddebo
- Diogo
- Djongo
- Doko
- Drekapou
- Gambito [4°50'0"N 21°17'0"E]
- Gambito [4°47'0"N 21°2'0"E]
- Gbada
- Gbadou
- Gbana
- Gbileba
- Gboundou
- Goffo
- Gongo
- Gopala
- Gouada
- Gouadji
- Gouakiri [5°10'0"N 21°18'0"E]
- Gouakiri [5°9'0"N 21°17'0"E]
- Gouamatou
- Gounda
- Goussa
- Goussou [5°15'0"N 21°'0"E]
- Goussou [4°55'0"N 21°20'0"E]
- Govo
- Gowe
- Goyo
- Guela
- Gueloumanda
- Kabou
- Kadja
- Kalaye
- Kaoua
- Kodo
- Kola
- Kologbo
- Kolomboyo
- Kongbo
- Kongo
- Kouledo
- Koumba
- Kpakpa
- Laodeka
- Liou
- Loe
- Mazogbo
- Mbele
- Mbiloba
- Mede
- Mia
- Moko
- Moro
- Ndjala
- Ngalia
- Ngapo
- Ngara
- Ngbindjou
- Ngoula
- Ngoule
- Ngrihou
- Nougolo
- Oroko
- Ouaga [5°37'0"N 21°'0"E]
- Ouaga [5°36'0"N 21°'0"E]
- Ouama
- Ouate
- Ouenguele
- Ouli
- Pagui
- Pandoko
- Pigala
- Poudjio
- Rokouzou
- Sounda
- Tagbale
- Tagoua
- Tchinda
- Tchingoto
- Teou
- Togbo
- Tomba
- Yota
- Youkou
- Zougao
- Zoulouma

== Notable people ==
- Emmanuel Dongala (1941-) -one of the Congo's greatest poets
