= Bossembélé =

- Location in Central African Republic
- Coordinates: 5°16′N 17°39′E
- Country: Central African Republic
- Prefecture: Ombella-Mpoko
- District: Yaloke-Bossembele

Government
  - Sub-Prefect: Béatrice Namkona
  - Mayor: Augustin Volongao

Bossembélé is a small town in Yaloke-Bossembele, in the Ombella-M'Poko Prefecture of the Central African Republic, lying 157 miles north west of Bangui on the main road to Cameroon. It is known for its market and its nightlife and is home to a cinema and an airstrip. The Lambi Falls lie near the town.

== History ==
On 23 March 2013 Séléka rebels took control of Bossembélé. On 16 January 2014 anti-balaka entered the town killing 43 people. In July 2017 it was reported that it was under control of security forces. On 18 December 2020 Coalition of Patriots for Change took control of Bossembélé. It was recaptured by government forces on 4 February 2021.

Bossembélé was named as a site of many crimes against humanity under President François Bozizé as his "personal prison".
