= N2 road (Central African Republic) =

Road in Central African Republic

N2 Road

Route information
- Maintained by Central African Republic National Highways Authority

Major junctions
- North end: Bangui
- South end: Obo

Location
- Country: Central African Republic

Highway system
- Transport in the Central African Republic

The N2 road also designated as RN2, is a national route in Central African Republic spanning about 1,250 kilometers. The road forms an east–west axis, connecting the capital city of Bangui to Obo, a remote town located in the far eastern reaches of the country. As the longest numbered road in the Central African Republic, the N2 plays a role in facilitating transportation and communication across the nation, traversing diverse landscapes and regions. Its eastern terminus in Obo marks the road's endpoint, having traversed a substantial distance from the capital city.

== Route ==
The N2 route originates in Bangui, diverging from the N1, and proceeds northeast through a flat savannah landscape. At Damara, the N4 route branches off, and the N2 continues as an asphalted road until Sibut, where the N8 splits off. From this point, the N2 turns east and transitions to a dirt road, running largely parallel to the Democratic Republic of Congo border, formed by the Ubangi River.

The road traverses a transitional zone from jungle to savannah, characterized by relatively sparse forestation. Notable towns along the route include Bambari and Bangassou. The road's condition deteriorates as it extends further east, becoming narrower and more rugged beyond Bangassou. The N2 terminates in Obo, approximately 100 kilometers west of the South Sudan border, which appears inaccessible by vehicle due to the road's poor condition.

== History ==
The N2 is the sole road connecting the eastern region of the Central African Republic. It serves as an alternative to transportation via the Ubangi River. The road is paved for approximately 160 kilometers, stretching from Bangui to Sibut. Notably, the section between Bangui and Damara was one of the country's earliest longer paved roads, completed in 1968. The subsequent section from Damara to Sibut was also asphalted. However, beyond Sibut, the road is unpaved, including in the larger towns along the route, highlighting the infrastructure challenges in the region.
