= N1 road (Central African Republic) =

Road in Central African Republic

N1 Road

Route information
- Maintained by Central African Republic National Highways Authority

Major junctions
- North end: Bangui
- South end: Békoro (TCH

Location
- Country: Central African Republic

Highway system
- Transport in the Central African Republic

The N1 road also designated as RN1, is a road in Central African Republic that spans a total distance of 498 kilometers. Originating in the capital city of Bangui, the road extends northwest, ultimately terminating at the international border with Chad, near the town of Békoro. As a key component of the country's road network, the N1 facilitates connectivity between the capital and the northeastern regions, playing a role in the nation's economic and social development.

== Route ==
The N1 route commences in the heart of Bangui, the capital city of the Central African Republic, near the Ubangi River, which forms the border with the Democratic Republic of Congo. Notably, there is no bridge at this location. Initially, the N1 is a single-lane asphalt road within Bangui, but as it exits the city, it diverges into two routes, with the N2 branching off towards the eastern part of the country.

Beyond Bangui, the N1 traverses the flat savannah landscape, reaching the town of Bossembélé after approximately 140 kilometers. At this point, the N3 route splits off towards the west. The road remains paved between Bangui and Bossembélé but transitions to an unpaved surface north of Bossembélé.

The terrain along this stretch is characterized by flat to gently sloping land, punctuated by shallow riverbeds with larger trees and sparse shrub and low forestation elsewhere. The dirt road is narrow and poorly developed, leading to the town of Bossangoa after around 150 kilometers. Here, a bridge crosses the Ouham River, and the road remains unpaved.

North of Bossangoa, the N1 curves slightly northwest, continuing as a dirt road for nearly 200 kilometers until reaching the border with Chad. The rolling savannah landscape persists, becoming increasingly arid towards the north. The border crossing is informal, and on the Chadian side, the road extends as a dirt road towards N'Djamena.

== History ==
The N1 route is intended to be the primary thoroughfare connecting Bangui, the capital of the Central African Republic, to N'Djamena, the capital of Chad. However, the majority of the road is unpaved and often challenging to navigate, with only the initial 150 kilometers from Bangui to Bossembélé being asphalted. The paved section was first introduced in the late 1970s with assistance from the World Bank, following a tender process in 1978. The primary objective of this project was to enhance the country's import and export capabilities via the port of Douala in Cameroon, in conjunction with the N3 route.

Prior to the paving of the N1, a mere 20% of the country's exports were transported through Douala. At the time, it was anticipated that this figure could increase to 50% by 1995. Nevertheless, due to conflicts and financial constraints, the full asphalting of the N1-N3 connection to Cameroon was not completed until 2020, significantly delaying the realization of these economic goals.
