= Ombella-M'Poko =

Prefecture of the Central African Republic

Coordinates: 5°0′N 18°0′E

- Prefecture
- Ombella-M'Poko in the Central African Republic

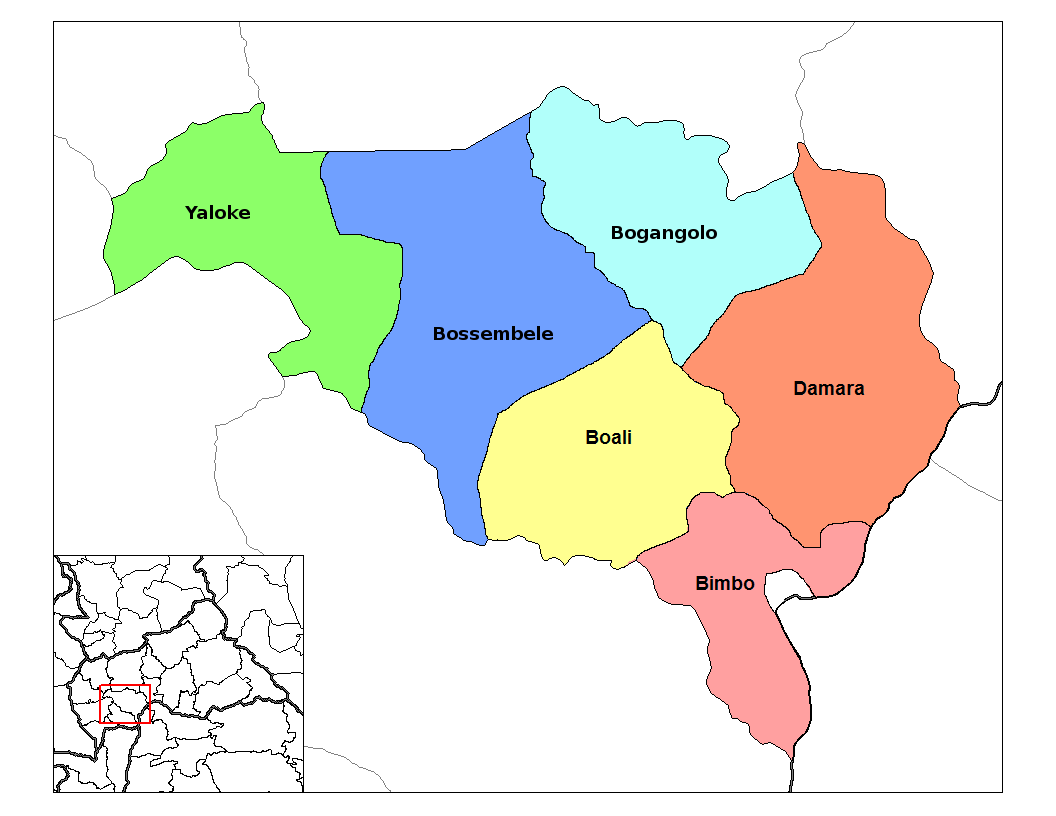
- Sub-prefectures of Ombella-M'Poko (former Bimbo included)
- Country: Central African Republic
- Capital: Boali

Area
  - Total: 28,710 km^{2} (11,080 sq mi)

Population (2003 census)
  - Total: 356,725
  - Estimate (2024 estimation): 292,618

Ombella-M'Poko is one of the 20 prefectures of the Central African Republic. Its capital is Boali since 10 December 2020, after the former capital Bimbo had to become part of Bangui Prefecture. In 2024, official estimates suggest the population reached 292,618 inhabitants.

One important tourist attraction is the Waterfalls of Boali; however, due to the Boali dam, the falls only carry water on the weekends.

== Geography ==
The prefecture lies in the southwestern part of the country and borders the prefectures of Ouham to the north; Lobaye to the south; Ouham-Pendé, Nana-Mambéré, and Mambéré-Kadéï to the west; and Kémo, as well as the independent city of Bangui and the Democratic Republic of the Congo to the east.

Lake Manuela is also located in this region.

== Sub-prefectures ==
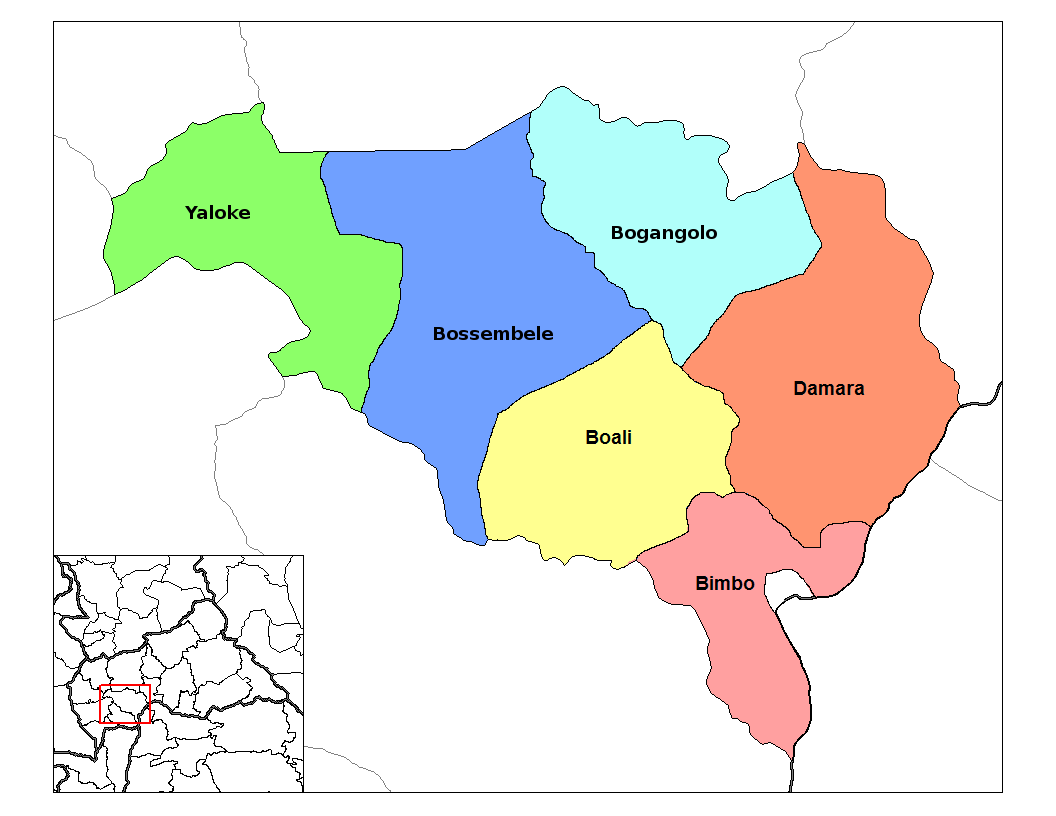
Sub-prefectures of Ombella-M'Poko

- Boali
- Damara
- Bogangolo
- Yaloke
- Bossembele
