= Basse-Kotto =

Prefecture of the Central African Republic

Coordinates: 5°00′N 21°30′E

- Prefecture
- Basse-Kotto in the Central African Republic

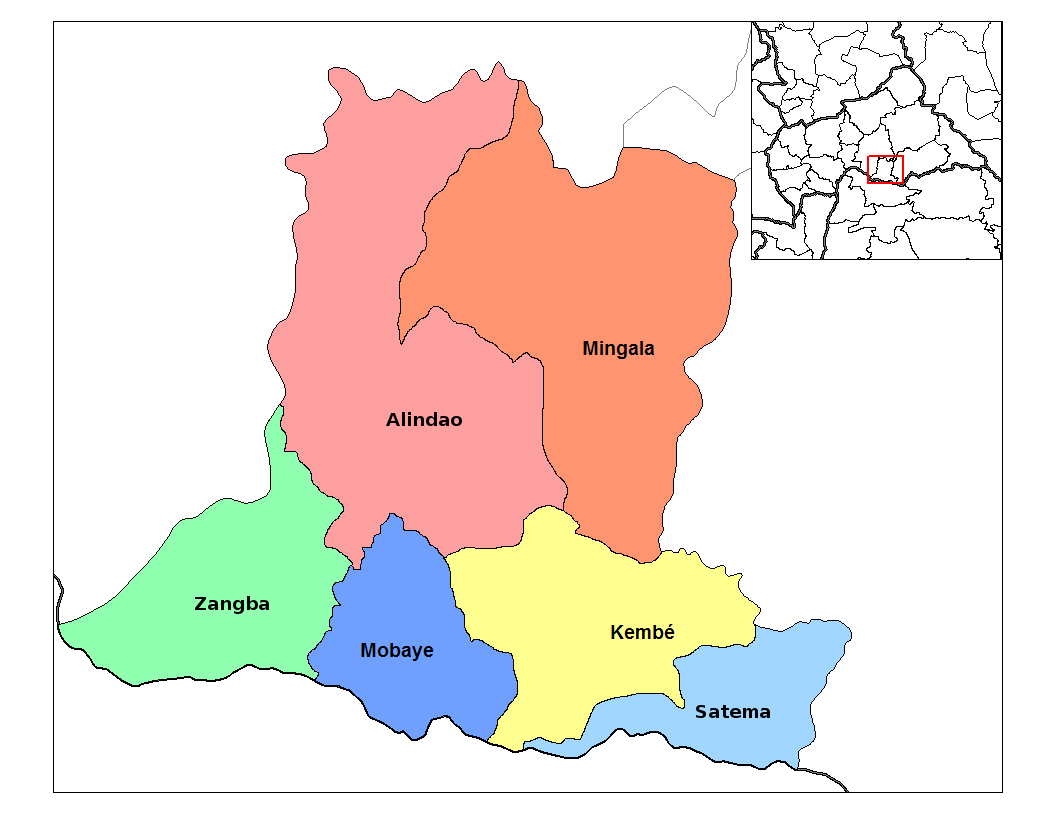
- Sub-prefectures of Basse-Kotto
- Country: Central African Republic
- Capital: Mobaye

Government
  - Acting Prefect: Victor De Pascal Wiyabona Yakombona
  - Acting Deputy Prefect: Auguste Gounindji

Area
  - Total: 17,604 km^{2} (6,797 sq mi)

Population (2003 census)
  - Total: 249,150
  - Estimate (2024 estimation): 393,276

Basse-Kotto ([bas ko.to], "Lower Kotto") is one of the 20 and the least populated prefecture of the Central African Republic. Its capital is Mobaye. In 2024, official estimates suggest the population reached 393,276 inhabitants.

== Sub-prefectures ==
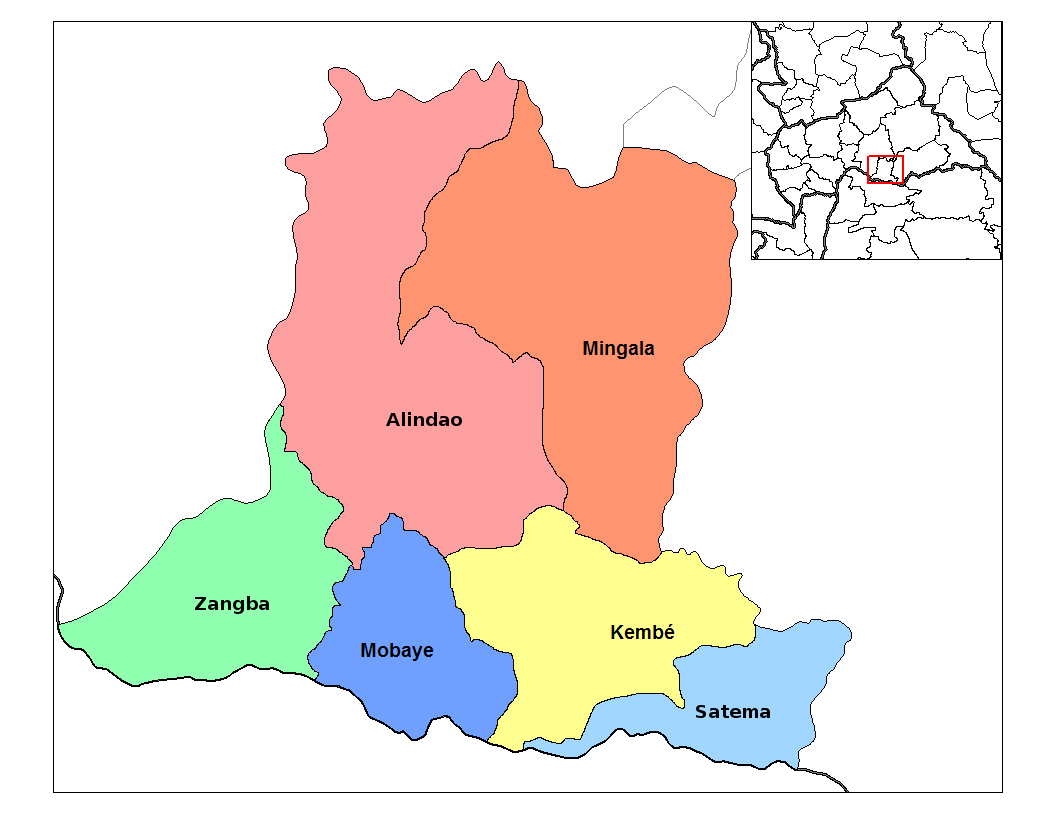
Sub-prefectures of Basse-Kotto

- Alindao
- Kembé
- Mingala
- Mobaye
- Satema
- Zangba
